= Lemonade, Inc. =

U.S. insurance company

- Type: Public
- Traded as: NYSE: LMND; Russell 2000 component
- Industry: Insurance
- Founded: April 2015; 11 years ago
- Founders: Daniel Schreiber; Shai Wininger
- Headquarters: New York City
- Area served: United States; France; The Netherlands; Germany; United Kingdom
- Key people: Daniel Schreiber (chairperson & co-CEO); Shai Wininger; (president & co-CEO); Tim Bixby (CFO)
- Products: Home insurance; Renters' insurance; Car insurance; Pet insurance; Life insurance
- Revenue: ▲US$527 million (2024)
- Operating income: ▲US$−204 million (2024)
- Net income: ▲US$−202 million (2024)
- Total assets: ▼US$1.85 billion (2024)
- Total equity: ▼US$593 million (2024)
- Number of employees: 1,235 (2024)
- Subsidiaries: Metromile
- Rating: A (Demotech)
- Website: lemonade.com

Lemonade, Inc. is an American insurance company. The company offers renters' insurance, homeowners' insurance, car insurance, pet insurance, and term life insurance in the United States, as well as contents and liability policies in Germany and the Netherlands and renters' insurance in France. The company is based in New York City and has approximately 2.9 million customers. Lemonade's business model focuses heavily on the usage of artificial intelligence and chatbots, with the company selling 98% of its policies through AI and handling over 60% of claims with AI.

== History ==
=== 2015–2019 ===
Lemonade was founded by Daniel Schreiber (former president of Powermat Technologies) and Shai Wininger (co-founder of Fiverr) in April 2015. Schreiber and Wininger were tech entrepreneurs with no insurance background.

In December 2015, the company secured $13 million in seed money from Sequoia Capital and Aleph.

In August 2016, the company raised $13 million in funding from XL Innovate (part of XL Group), followed by a $34 million Series B funding round in December 2016. The Series B round was led by General Catalyst with participation from Thrive Capital, Tusk Ventures, and GV (formerly Google Ventures).

In May 2016, Lemonade became one of the few insurance companies to receive B-Corporation certification.

In April 2017, the company announced additional investors: Allianz and Ashton Kutcher’s Sound Ventures. In December 2017, Softbank invested an additional $120 million in the company in a Series C round, increasing the total money raised by the company to around $180 million.

In April 2019, Lemonade announced a further $300 million investment in a Series D financing led by SoftBank Group, with participation from Allianz, General Catalyst, GV, OurCrowd, and Thrive Capital, increasing the total money raised by the company to $480 million.

=== 2020–present ===
In April 2020, the company launched in the Netherlands.

On July 1, 2020, the company became a public company via an initial public offering. The company sold 11,000,000 shares of its common stock, each share priced at $29.00, under the ticker symbol "LMND" on the New York Stock Exchange.

In December 2020, it began offering insurance in France. It also won a trademark dispute with T-Mobile over the use of the color pink.

In May 2021, short-seller Carson Block wrote a letter to Lemonade co-founder and chief executive Daniel Schreiber sharing details of an “accidentally discovered” security flaw that exposed Lemonade customers’ personally identifiable account data. Block wrote that the bug was “unforgivably negligent,” and that his firm was shorting the company's stock “because it is clear Lemonade does not give a fuck about securing its customers’ sensitive personal information."

In November 2021, the company announced that it would fully acquire Metromile, Inc. The acquisition completed on July 29, 2022, following which Lemonade laid off 20% of Metromile's staff.

In January 2026, Lemonade partnered with Tesla to launch the Lemonade Autonomous Car Insurance, a first-of-its-kind offering designed specifically for self-driving cars.

== See also ==
- List of United States insurance companies
