= Coya AG =

German insurer

- Company type: Private company
- Industry: Insurance
- Founded: 2016
- Founder: Andrew Shaw, Dr. Peter Hagen and Sebastián Villarroel
- Defunct: January 18, 2021
- Fate: Acquired
- Successor: Luko (Later Allianz)
- Headquarters: Berlin, Germany
- Area served: Germany
- Products: Property insurance Casualty insurance
- Owner: Luko (later Allianz)
- Website: coya.com

Coya was a German property and casualties insurance provider headquartered in Berlin offering liability policies for people and pets as well as home content and bicycle theft insurances. Coya delivered insurance policies and handled claims through desktop and mobile apps. The company was acquired by French insurance startup Luko in 2021, which was later acquired by Allianz (https://www.allianzdirect.de/presse/allianz-direct-uebernimmt-das-franzoesische-hausratversicherungsgeschaeft-von-luko/). GetSafe acquired the German portfolio.

The company was licensed by the German Federal Financial Supervisory Authority (BaFin), enabling it to offer its own insurance policies.

Coya firstly launched its home content insurance and later offered a variety of insurance products such as private liability, home contents, dog liability, bike theft, e-bike theft and pet health.

== History ==
Coya was founded in September 2016 by Andrew Shaw, Dr. Peter Hagen and Sebastián Villarroel and started to provide its first approved insurance in June 2018.

In its Series A round of financing, Coya has received nearly $30 million. The company is strategically and financially backed by investors such as Valar Ventures, e ventures, La Famiglia, and Yabeo Capital, as well as various business angels such as Mato Peric and Rolf Schrömgens. It also received cash injections from PayPal founder Peter Thiel and was in the list of top 30 funded German startups in 2019.

In January 2022, the company was acquired by French insurance startup Luko in and the company and all policies was renamed as Luko.

== Business model ==
Coya's business model was a fully licensed insurance risk carrier leveraging on digital, paperless insurance distribution model that enables customers to get insured quickly and to manage their insurance claims and policies directly through an online dashboard without the need for insurance brokers and agents.
