= Expatriate insurance =

Type of insurance policy

Expatriate insurance are insurance policies that are designed to cover financial and other risks incurred specifically by expatriates while living and working in a country other than one's own. The insurances that expatriates need are similar to individuals living in the country but may be more complex to arrange because they are not native. There may also be specific risks for high-risk areas of the world where specialty insurance can provide coverage for war and terrorism, kidnap and ransom.

Insurance is typically arranged prior to relocating to a new country or destination. Policies will generally cover the duration of the stay and can be purchased on an annual basis. Expatriate insurance is similar to travel insurance but will cover longer periods time and deal with more complex requirements. The most common insurance policies purchased by expatriates include health insurance, personal property, automobile insurance and life insurance.

== Personal property insurance ==
Personal property insurance will provide coverage for valuable items. This type of cover is usually attached to a home insurance policy which will provide coverage for all "fixtures and fittings within the home" and "additional items of increased value". With a home insurance policy it is possible to include specific items on a "worldwide all risks" (WWAR) basis which will protect valuables outside the home. Insurers will typically require proof of value when insuring WWAR items and the addition of these items will increase the plans premium. In the USA this type of plan is commonly referred to as renters' insurance, although the scope of these policies overseas can have much wider implications.

Home insurance is different from fire insurance which protects the physical structure of the home and all rebuilding costs. Fire insurance policies are normally only obtained in the case that an individual actually owns the property and can be extended to cover "extra" or "allied perils". Extra perils can usually be added to a policy at the expense of an increased premium and can include typhoons/hurricanes/cyclones, flood damage, landslip and subsidence, and what in the USA is referred to as "an act of God". This type of insurance is highly unlikely to be needed by expatriates unless otherwise stipulated in tenancy agreements.

For individuals who are relocating overseas international transport insurance is often required. These plans are broad in their scope and if the items insured are being shipped to their destination then the policy will usually be subject to marine insurance and maritime law. This includes all principals of average, salvage (different from the salvage found in property and auto insurance), and sue and tort. International transport insurance can be complicated as there are many different areas of consideration, typically an insurance company that deals with this area of insurance will have dedicated international transport specialists.

Property insurance claims can be complicated and are usually settled in the following ways:

- Indemnity - The payment of monies to the insured to cover the loss. This is also known as a "Cash payment".
- Repair - Payment to a repairer to fix the damaged item or property.
- Replacement - With new items, property, or items that are likely to suffer very little depreciation, the insurer may choose to simply give the insured a new item that is the same as the one that was lost. This can be beneficial to the insurer, especially if they can obtain a discount from the supplier.
- Restoration - Typically this means the restoration of the item or property to the condition that it was in immediately prior to the loss.
- New For Old - the substitution of a new item that acts the same way as the item that was lost or damaged.

== International auto insurance ==
Automobile primary liability (also known as third party liability) insurance is generally a required purchased in the country where the expatriate is located. Local governments often require this in order to register a vehicle.

Third party liability insurance rates may vary drastically. Shopping for competitive rates is as essential abroad as it is in the United States or Europe.

It is very difficult to transfer auto insurance from country to country. However, no claims discount (NCD) or no claims bonus (NCB) may be transferred, leading to substantial discounts for expatriates worldwide.

The main types of auto (or motor) insurance available internationally are:

- Third party coverage - Coverage for an individual's liability at law to any third parties who have died or been injured, or any damaged to property resulting from an accident.
- Third party fire and theft coverage - The scope of cover described above with the addition of property insurance on the vehicle but only in terms of a loss resulting from fire or theft.
- Comprehensive coverage - This has the widest scope of cover. It includes both third party, fire, and theft coverage with the addition of "all risks" insurance. Typically the premiums for comprehensive vehicle cover are the highest.

Different countries will have different requirements in regards to the minimum amount of coverage that an individual must have. These requirements are usually set forth by the country's insurance authority or regulator. In nations that where previously British colonies it is usually the case that every vehicle should be covered under a basic third-party liability plan or ACT policy. ACT insurance refers to the British Road Traffic Act 1930, which laid out the basic requirements for motor insurance at that time. ACT insurance will only cover the insured for any death or injury resulting from an accident.

== International health insurance ==
These policies typically include worldwide medical protection and also can include evacuation services. Many of these plans have direct-pay with hospitals & global networks worldwide as well as worldwide emergency assistance to help find a facility for treatment.

Policies are underwritten in one of two ways: moratorium; and full medical underwriting. With moratorium underwriting, applicants are not required to disclose any medical declarations, and so some pre-existing conditions may be covered; although, there are restrictions to the coverage of pre-existing conditions. New or unexpected conditions occurring after the start date are covered according to policy conditions. Full medical underwriting requires the collection of a full medical history, and usually excludes coverage of pre-existing conditions.
