= Swiss abroad =

Swiss people living abroad

Map of the Swiss diaspora in the world (includes ancestry). Switzerland + 100,000 + 10,000 + 1,000

The Swiss diaspora refers to Swiss people living abroad (German: Auslandsschweizer, French: Suisses de l’étranger, Italian: Svizzeri all’estero, Romansh: Svizzers a l’exteriur), also referred to as "fifth Switzerland" (German: Fünfte Schweiz, French: Cinquième Suisse, Italian: Quinta Svizzera, Romansh: Tschintgavla Svizra), alluding to the fourfold linguistic division within the country. The Federal Department of Foreign Affairs (FDFA) cares for Swiss people living abroad.

== Fifth Switzerland Communication ==
The FDFA provides four different ways of communication with Swiss people abroad. These services include: Voting and electoral right, Consular services, Organization of the Swiss Abroad (OSA) and the Swiss Revue.

The service "Itineris" provided by the FDFA is available to all Swiss abroad. SWI swissinfo.ch is a multilingual news and information service with a mandate to serve the interests of Swiss abroad.

== Swiss expatriate regions ==
- In 2023, some 813,420 Swiss nationals were registered with Swiss representations as living abroad. For reference, in 2007, a total of 668,107 Swiss citizens (10.0%) were registered as living abroad.
- A majority (71.5%) held dual citizenship; vast majority of these had citizenship of another European Economic Area country, namely and primarily France, Germany, Italy or the United Kingdom or were citizens of United States, Canada, Australia or New Zealand. Swiss Jews form a small group in Israel.

=== Overall ===
- 813,420 Swiss abroad
- The data used comes from the 2023 statistics is provided by the Federal Department of Foreign Affairs.

The following ten countries have the highest populations of Swiss abroad:

Swiss citizens internationally
Country	Swiss citizens
France	209,287
Germany	99,582
United States	83,667
Italy	51,964
Canada	41,463
United Kingdom	40,183
Australia	25,827
Spain	26,499
Israel	23,670
Austria	18,350

=== Africa ===
The following five countries have Africa's highest populations of Swiss abroad:

Swiss citizens in Africa
Country	Swiss citizens
South Africa	7,743
Morocco	1,561
Tunisia	1,426
Egypt	1,398
Kenya	826

=== Asia ===
The following five countries have Asia's highest populations of Swiss abroad:

Swiss citizens in Asia
Country	Swiss citizens
Israel	23,670
Thailand	10,414
Philippines	3,615
United Arab Emirates	3,452
China, including Hong Kong and Macau	2,564

==== Brunei ====
Suzanne Rahaman Aeby (b. 1954 Freibourg), a former nurse, is the mother of Pengiran Anak Sarah, the wife of Brunei's Crown Prince, Al-Muhtadee Billah.

==== Taiwan ====
- 351 Swiss abroad

==== Sri Lanka ====
The Schweizerischer Hülfsverein in Ceylon was founded on 15 September 1933. In the beginning, its main purpose was to provide assistance to Swiss citizens in need. In 1956, the Swiss Circle Colombo was established to promote social activities among Swiss nationals in Ceylon. It is now known as Swiss Circle Sri Lanka.

=== Europe ===
==== Albania ====
- 94 Swiss abroad

==== France ====
The largest number of Swiss immigrants arrived in France between the 1850s and the 1930s. Many of them settled in Alsace and in the cities of Paris, Marseille and Lyon.

Swiss immigration to France, from 1851 to 1936; Source: Quid 2003, p. 624, b.
	Year						
Nationality	1851	1891	1901	1921	1926	1931	1936
Swiss	25,485	83,117	72,047	90,000	123,119	98,000	79,000

Portugal

- 6,916 Swiss abroad

==== Russia ====
Significant emigration of Swiss people to the Russian Empire occurred from the late 17th to the late 19th century. The late 18th and early 19th century saw a flow of Swiss farmers forming colonies such as Şaba (Bessarabia, at the Dniester Liman, now part of Ukraine). The Russian-Swiss generally prospered, partly merging with German diaspora populations. As at the end of 2016, 776 Swiss citizens live in Russia.

==== Sweden ====
Swiss people in Sweden are people who are registered in Sweden and who originate in Switzerland. According to Statistics Sweden, in 2017 there were a total of approximately 3,900 people born in Switzerland including Swedish citizens of Swiss descent.

==== United Kingdom ====
There is a significant Swiss community in the United Kingdom.

=== North America ===
==== Antigua and Barbuda ====
- 44 Swiss abroad

==== Mexico ====
- 5,289 Swiss abroad

==== United States ====
The first Swiss person in what is now the territory of the United States was Theobald von Erlach (1541–1565). Before the year 1820 some estimated 25,000 to 30,000 Swiss entered British North America. Most of them settled in what is now Pennsylvania, as well as North and South Carolina.

Most Swiss preferred the rural villages of the Midwest and the Pacific Coast, where Italian-speaking Swiss played a significant role in California's winegrowing culture. Swiss immigration diminished after 1930 because of the Great Depression and World War II.

In 1999 New Glarus, Wisconsin, was chosen as the future home of the Swiss Center of North America, a cultural center dedicated to the preservation and celebration of Swiss culture. New Glarus was chosen because of its central location and the large concentration of Swiss Americans in the vicinity. Funds for the centre came from the United States Department of Housing and Urban Development, the state of Wisconsin, the canton of Glarus, and corporations, including General Casualty Insurance, Nestlé USA, Novartis, Phillip Morris Europe, and Victorinox.

=== Oceania ===
- 32,316 (+664, 31,652)

==== Australia ====
Over 20,000 people of Swiss origin live in Australia.

==== New Zealand ====
- 6,925 Swiss abroad

=== South America ===
==== Argentina ====
- 15,120 Swiss abroad

By 1940, some 44,000 Swiss had emigrated to Argentina, settling mainly in the provinces of Córdoba and Santa Fe, and to a lesser extent, in Buenos Aires. In 1856 the colony farm of Esperanza was founded in Santa Fe becoming the mother of agricultural colonies in Argentina, and thus beginning a long process of European colonization and immigration on Argentine soil. Current estimates state 400,000 Swiss descendants residing in Argentina.

==== Brazil ====
- 13,611 Swiss abroad
- Up to 500,000 Swiss descendants.

The history of Swiss immigration to Brazil began with the foundation of the colony of Nova Friburgo in 1819. Nova Friburgo was the first colonial company contracted by the Portuguese government. The immigrant colonists wrote letters for publication in Swiss newspapers of the period, and these documents reveal the migrants' perceptions, information and expectations.

On 4 July 1819 1,088 Swiss, including 830 from the Canton of Fribourg, departed from Estavayer-le-Lac on Lake Neuchâtel. They included Jean-Claude Marchon, his wife Marie Prostasie Chavannaz Marchon, his brother Antoine Marchon and fiancée Marieanne Elizabeth Clerc. They travelled first to Basle, the meeting point of the Swiss Transmigration for Brasil. And then 2.000 Swiss, by the Rhein River, go to Holland and after a lot of peripetia they depart from St. Gravendeel, near Dordrecht, in the Daphne, for the crossing of the Atlantic Ocean, on September 11. Their arrival in Rio de Janeiro was on November 4, spending 55 days, a very good time for the epoch. And, finally, they arrive in Morro-Queimado (Burnt Mount) on November 15, 1819 – about 12000 kilometers in 105 days, approximately 114 kilometers a day.

==== Chile ====
- 5,730 Swiss abroad
- Between 90,000 and 100,000 descendants.

The percentage of Swiss in Chile is small, despite having a relatively large number of members. This is because their linguistic and cultural characteristics are commonly confused with Germans, Italians and French. Swiss migration to Chile took place at the end of the nineteenth century, between 1883 and 1900, particularly in the area of Araucanía, especially in Victoria and Traiguén. It is estimated that more than 8,000 families received grants of land.

Between April 1876 and May 1877 a contingent of Swiss immigrants comprising 119 families came to the area of Magallanes (Punta Arenas and Fresh Water), mostly peasants from the canton of Fribourg.

Later, during the period from 1915 to 1950, was the last recorded mass exodus of Swiss to Chile. 30,000 people settled in the central area of the country, primarily in Santiago and Valparaíso. There are currently 5,000 Swiss citizens residing in Chile and between 90,000 and 100,000 Swiss descendants.

==== Colombia ====
- 2,348 Swiss abroad

==== Venezuela ====
- 840 Swiss abroad

Joaquin Ritz and Melchor Grubel arrived in Venezuela in 1529 and 1535 respectively - the first Swiss who came to South America. As of 2009, 1,900 Swiss citizens lived in Venezuela.

== Ancestry ==
Self-reported Swiss ancestry or partial ancestry:

Country	Population (partial ancestry)	% of country	Source
(United States) Swiss American	997,233	0.3%	
(Argentina) Swiss Argentine	400,000 or more	1%	
(Canada) Swiss Canadian	146,830	0.4%	
(Chile) Swiss Chilean	90,000 to 130,000	1%	
(Brazil) Swiss Brazilian	80,000 or more	0.04%	
(Australia) Swiss Australian	28,947	0.1%	

== See also ==
- Foreign relations of Switzerland
- Swiss people
- Demographics of Switzerland
- Immigration to Switzerland
- Swiss Abroad Act (Switzerland)
