= State National Companies =

State National Companies, Inc.
- State National Companies Logo
- Company type: Subsidiary
- Traded as: Nasdaq: SNC (2014–2017)
- Industry: Insurance
- Founded: 1973; 53 years ago
- Founder: Garry, Lonnie and Terry Ledbetter
- Headquarters: 1900 L. Don Dodson Drive, Bedford, Texas, U.S.
- Area served: United States (50 states)
- Products: Insurance fronting and collateral protection insurance
- Number of employees: 400
- Parent: Markel Group
- Website: www.statenational.com

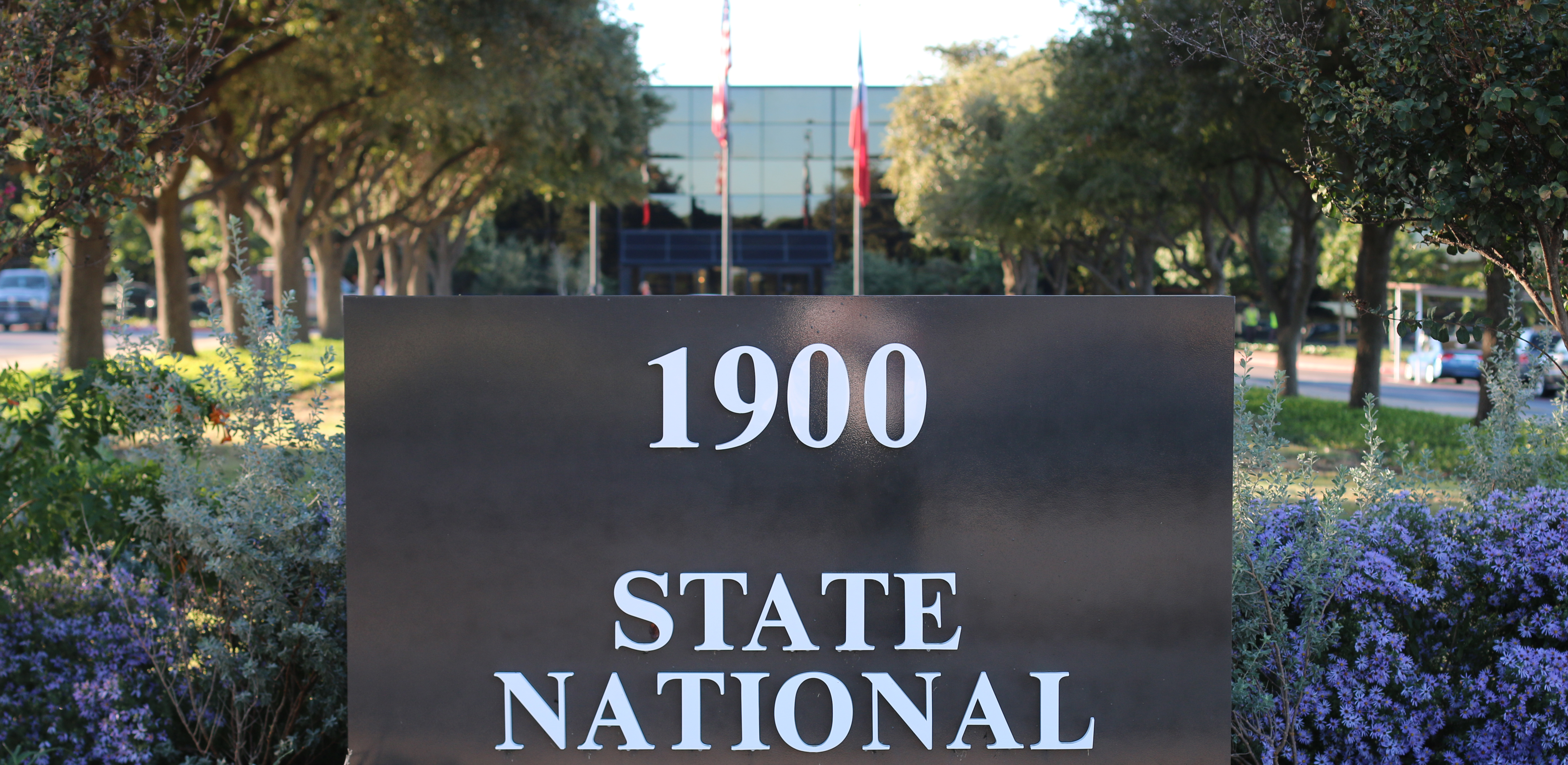
State National Headquarters in Bedford, Texas

State National Companies, Inc. is a specialty provider of property and casualty insurance operating in two niche markets, Program Services and Lender Services. The company is licensed to do business in all 50 states and D.C.

== Company history ==
In 1973, brothers Garry, Terry and Lonnie Ledbetter founded a general agency selling Collateral Protection Insurance (CPI) exclusively in Texas. By the late 1970s, the agency began to expand writing CPI business beyond Texas.

In 1984, the agency created State National Insurance Company (SNIC) to underwrite CPI business directly. SNIC received an “A” (Excellent) rating from A.M. Best in 1993, and has maintained the rating since then.

In 1999, the company acquired Texas-domiciled National Specialty Insurance Company (NSIC), an insurance company then licensed to write business in 21 states, and later expanded its licensing to 50 states and D.C. In 2006, the company formed Delaware-domiciled United Specialty Insurance Company (USIC) to write coverage on an excess and surplus basis. The subsidiaries SNIC, NSIC, and USIC, as well as City National Insurance Company and Independent Specialty Insurance Company, comprise State National Group.

In 2014, Lonnie retired and Terry assumed the roles of chief executive officer, President, and chairman. State National Companies began trading on the NASDAQ Global Select Market under the symbol SNC on November 3, 2014. In 2015, Terry was named to IBA Hot 100 list of influential people in the insurance industry. Effective February 8, 2016, Matthew Freeman was named President of State National Companies, and Terry remains CEO and chairman.

On July 26, 2017, Markel Corp. announced it will acquire State National Companies Inc. for $919 million, a deal that the Virginia-based insurer and reinsurer said will help diversify its underwriting and revenue streams. Both companies’ board of directors voted unanimously to approve the deal. Plans call for closing the acquisition in the 2017 fourth quarter.

== Divisions ==
State National Companies has two divisions: Program Services and Lender Services.

=== Program Services ===
In State National's Program Services segment, the company provides access to the U.S. property and casualty insurance market in exchange for a ceding fee. Program Services is targeted to specialty general agents (GAs) or other insurance producers that sell, control, and administer books of insurance business that are supported by third-party reinsurers, domestic and foreign insurers and institutional risk investors (alternative capital/capacity providers) that want to access specific lines of U.S. property and casualty insurance business. State National's Program Services are also used by insurers that have experienced rating downgrades and need access to "A"-rated paper, such as Meadowbrook Insurance's agreement with State National Insurance Co. to provide “A” rated policies for a portion of its business in August 2013.

State National offers 50-state licensing authority through three admitted carriers, State National Insurance Company, National Specialty Insurance Company and City National Insurance Company as well as two excess and surplus lines carriers, United Specialty Insurance Company and Independent Specialty Insurance Company. State National maintains an “A” (Excellent) rating from A.M. Best, which has assigned the State National Group a Financial Size Category (FSC) of IX. Through issuing carriers, State National's Program Services clients write a variety of insurance products, including general liability insurance, commercial liability insurance, commercial multi-peril insurance, property insurance, and workers compensation insurance. The company reinsures substantially all of the underwriting and operating risks in connection with issuing carrier arrangements.

=== Lender Services ===
In State National's Lender Services segment, the company provides various portfolio protection products including Collateral Protection Insurance (CPI). These products insure personal automobiles, light trucks, SUVs and other vehicles held as collateral for loans made by credit unions, banks and specialty finance companies. State National primarily markets directly to financial institutions, and agents make up only a small part of how the company markets its products.

Lenders purchase portfolio protection to provide coverage for automobiles or other vehicles of borrowers who do not uphold their obligation to insure the collateral underlying the loan. State National manages all aspects of the insurance business cycle, including sales and marketing, policy issuance, policy administration, underwriting and claims handling.

State National services portfolio protection insurance clients through InsurTrak, the company's proprietary technology platform that allows both State National and its clients to track and manage a CPI program.

In 2009, State National entered into an exclusive relationship with CUNA Mutual to provide collateral protection insurance in the credit union marketplace. The partnership created the company's largest one-year increase into the credit union market. In June 2014, the two companies renewed their alliance in a contract valid through July 2018.
