= CCIP =

CCIP may refer to:

- Centre for Critical Infrastructure Protection, New Zealand
- Cisco Certified Internetwork Professional, one of the Cisco Career Certifications
- Common Configuration Implementation Program
- Constantly computed impact point
- Paris Chamber of Commerce (Chambre de Commerce et d'Industrie de Paris)
- Contractor Controlled Insurance Program, an alternative to an Owner Controlled Insurance Program in the construction industry
- Cross-Chain Interoperability Protocol, an omnibus blockchain feature of Chainlink
