= Margaret Holland Sargent =

American artist (born 1927)

- Margaret Holland Sargent with Bill Gates and William H. Gates, Sr. in front of Holland's painting of Mary Maxwell Gates.
- Born: December 30, 1927 (age 98); Hollywood, California, U.S.
- Occupation: portrait artist
- Years active: 1958–present

Margaret Holland Sargent (born December 30, 1927), also known as Meg Sargent, is an American portrait artist based in Los Angeles, California. She has painted over three hundred oil portraits, including portraits of Tennessee Williams, Gerald Ford, Jimmy Carter and Margaret Thatcher.

== Background ==
Sargent's father, Cecil Holland, was a character actor and theatrical makeup artist. He has been cited as influential on her career. Sargent traveled extensively as an adult with her husband, a career military officer. She studied acting and costume design at the University of California at Los Angeles and is a member of Kappa Delta sorority.

Herbert Abrams introduced Sargent to oil painting in the 1960s and she continued to study with John Howard Sanden in the 1970s at the Art Students League of New York. She first painted in a spare bedroom of her home, eventually developing a freestanding studio on her property.

== Career ==
Sargent is a skilled businesswoman who has promoted herself throughout her career, employing portfolios, flyers, a website and print advertisements. She has used computers and digital cameras in her work since 1997.

Sargent has frequently painted portraits of officers from the U.S. military, such as Alexander Haig, James Stockdale She is known for painting many of the first women officers in the United States military, including Kristin Baker (first Captain at West Point), first woman graduate from West Point (Andrea Hollen), and the first female chaplain in the armed forces, Dianna Pohlman Bell. She painted Mary Maxwell Gates' portrait. Her artwork of Dorothy Stimson Bullitt was used as cover art for Delphine Haley's book, Dorothy Stimson Bullitt: An Uncommon Life.

Sargent was the first female member of the Salmagundi Club, the American Portrait Society, and the Council of Leading American Portrait Painters.

Throughout her painting career, Sargent has acted in movies, television, and commercials.

== Professional organizations ==
- American Portrait Society
- The American Society of Portrait Artists
- Council of Leading American Portrait Painters
- Painters Club of New York
- Salmagundi Club
