= Mary Maxwell Gates =

American businesswoman (1929–1994)

- Portrait by Margaret Holland Sargent
- Born: Mary Ann Maxwell; July 5, 1929; Seattle, Washington, U.S.
- Died: June 10, 1994 (aged 64); Seattle, Washington, U.S.
- Education: University of Washington (BA)
- Occupations: Civic activist, non-profit executive, banker, schoolteacher
- Spouse: Bill Gates Sr. (m. 1951)
- Children: 3, including Bill

Mary Ann Gates (née Maxwell; July 5, 1929 – June 10, 1994) was an American banker, civic activist, non-profit executive, and schoolteacher. She was the first female president of King County's United Way, the first woman to chair the national United Way’s executive committee where she served most notably with IBM's CEO, John Opel, and the first woman on the First Interstate Bank of Washington's board of directors.

She served on the boards of various major corporations including the First Interstate Bank, Unigard Security Insurance Group, and Pacific Northwest Bell. She also served for 18 years (1975–1993) on the University of Washington's board of regents. She was the mother of Bill Gates, the co-founder of Microsoft.

== Personal life ==
Mary Ann Maxwell was born in Seattle, Washington, on July 5, 1929, to James Willard Maxwell (Nebraska, 1901–1960), a banker, and his wife, whom he married in c. 1927, Adele Thompson (c. 1903–1987, probably born in Enumclaw, Washington). Her paternal grandfather, James Willard Maxwell (1864–1951), was president of the National City Bank in Seattle from 1911 to 1929 and a director of the Seattle branch of the Federal Reserve Bank of San Francisco.

She graduated from Seattle's Roosevelt High School and then attended the nearby University of Washington, where she received a degree in education in 1950. She married UW law graduate William H. Gates, Sr. in 1951, and she taught school in the early 1950s. After her husband co-founded the law practice that became Preston Gates & Ellis in Seattle, Gates turned to a variety of civic activities. Gates' volunteer roles in Seattle and King County included serving on the boards of the Children's Hospital Foundation, Seattle Symphony, Greater Seattle Chamber of Commerce, United Way of King County, and many other nonprofit organizations. She served as President of the Junior League of Seattle from 1966 to 1967.

She had three children, one of whom is Microsoft co-founder Bill Gates.

== Career ==
In 1975, Governor Daniel J. Evans appointed Gates to the board of regents for her alma mater, Gates served on the UW Foundation Board of Directors, the UW Medical Center Board, and the UW School of Business Administration's Advisory Board.

Gates also served for many years on the boards of several major corporations: First Interstate Bank of Washington; Unigard Security Insurance Group; Pacific Northwest Bell Telephone Company, which became USWEST Communications; and KIRO Incorporated.

Beyond the Seattle area, Gates was appointed to the board of directors of the national United Way in 1980, becoming the first woman to lead it in 1983. Her tenure on the national board's executive committee is believed to have helped Microsoft, based in Seattle, at a crucial time. In 1980, she discussed her son's company with John Opel, a fellow committee member, and the chairman of International Business Machines Corporation (IBM). Opel, by some accounts, mentioned Mrs. Gates to other IBM executives. A few weeks later, IBM took a chance by hiring Microsoft, then a small software firm, to develop an operating system for its first personal computer.

== Death ==
Gates died at age 64 on June 10, 1994, at her home in the Laurelhurst neighborhood of Seattle after suffering from breast cancer for several months. Since then, her family has established two endowments in her name at the University of Washington. The UW's Mary Gates Hall is named in her honor and houses the UW's Undergraduate Academic Affairs, the Office of Minority Affairs & Diversity, the Career Center, and the Information School. A street on the northeast section of campus, formerly Union Bay Place, is named for her.

Following her death, it was disclosed that she was the target of a kidnapping attempt several years earlier.
