= Now Health International =

International health insurance provider

Now Health International is an international private medical insurance (IPMI) provider with its company headquarters in Hong Kong. It has further operations in Shanghai, Beijing, Singapore, Jakarta, Dubai and Camberley in the United Kingdom. The 'Now' in the company's name stems from their claim to provide international health insurance plans rapidly online.

In July 2015, Now Health International's investor The Primary Group, acquired Best Doctors Insurance from Best Doctors Inc., a major medical insurance provider with distribution throughout Latin America, the Caribbean and Canada. The transaction creates an independent IPMI proposition with complementary products, distribution and geographies. The operation spans 4 continents, with 12 offices, 100,000+ members, 300+ staff and 5,000+ distribution partners.

== History ==
Martin Garcia, the CEO of Now Health, began formalising a business plan for the company in 2009. Now Health International was then built in 2010 by a group of IPMI experts using USD 30m of investment from private equity investor The Primary Group, and the company launched officially in 2011. It has 300+ employees and 100,000 customers worldwide.

Insurance technology provider Xuber, based in London provides the infrastructure and technology behind Now Health International, with a lot of the company's services being carried out electronically.

Now Health International's head office is in central Hong Kong, with service centres in Beijing, Abu Dhabi, Dubai, Hong Kong, London, Shanghai and Singapore. In September 2015 the company launched an operation in Indonesia, aimed at the 65,000 expats resident there.

Customers are either expatriates or local nationals that require access to healthcare outside their country of residence. It particularly targets companies with less than 99 expatriates.

In 2015 the merger of Now Health International and Best Doctors Insurance was announced.

== Operations ==
RGA provide the global reinsurance arrangements for Now Health International's plans.

The company also has further regional relationships with AXA General Insurance Hong Kong Limited in Hong Kong, AXA Insurance (Gulf) B.S.C (c) in the UAE, Minan Property and Casualty Insurance Company Limited in Mainland China, Tenet Sompo Insurance Pte. Ltd. in Singapore, and PT. Asuransi Sompo Japan Nipponkoa Indonesia in Indonesia. It has a call centre in the Dubai Outsourcing Zone.

It has produced an app which allows customers to search for their nearest medical provider on the company's approved list and to submit a reimbursement claim for medical expenses.
