= Bradley Tusk =

American businessman and political strategist (born 1973)

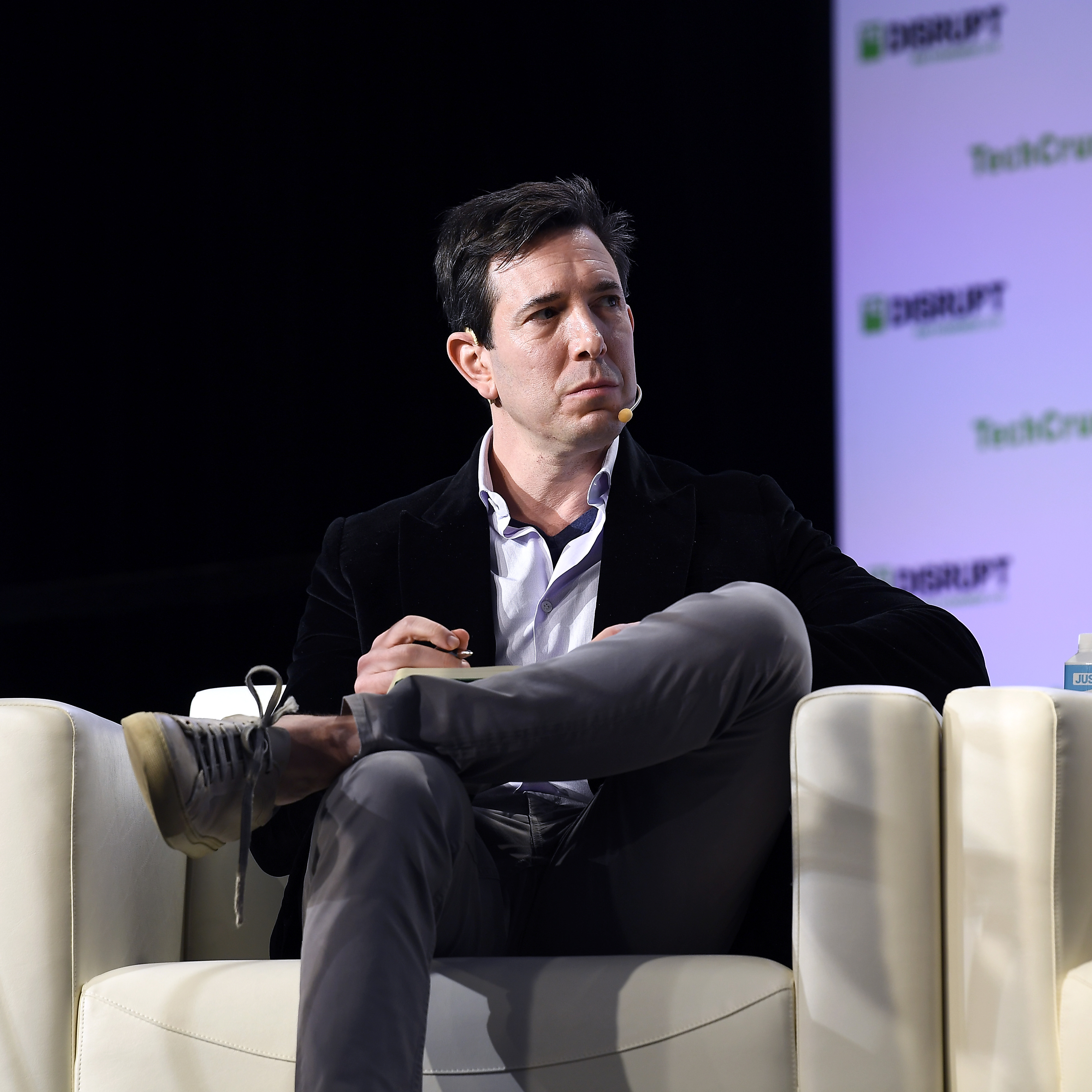
- Tusk in 2019
- Born: October 3, 1973 (age 53)
- Education: University of Pennsylvania (BA); University of Chicago (JD)

Bradley Tusk (born October 3, 1973) is an American businessman, venture capitalist, political strategist, and writer. He is the founder and CEO of Tusk Ventures, a venture capital fund focused on investing in early-stage startups in regulated industries. His foundation Tusk Philanthropies focuses on mobile voting and anti-hunger policy campaigns in the United States. He is also the former chairman of IG Acquisition Corp. Tusk is a columnist for Fast Company, and is the author of The Fixer: My Adventures Saving Startups from Death by Politics.

Tusk previously served as the campaign manager for New York City Mayor Michael Bloomberg's successful 2009 re-election bid, as Deputy Governor of Illinois, as Communications Director for US Senator Chuck Schumer, and as an early political advisor to Uber.

== Early life and education ==
Bradley Tusk was raised in Sheepshead Bay, Brooklyn, and in Lawrence, Nassau County, New York where he attended Lawrence High School. Tusk is a graduate of the University of Pennsylvania where he received his BA in 1995. He has a JD from the University of Chicago Law School, which he received in 1999.

== Politics and government ==
=== Pennsylvania ===
Tusk began his career in politics as an undergraduate student working for the former Mayor of Philadelphia, Ed Rendell.

=== New York ===
After graduating from college, Tusk became the spokesperson for the New York City Parks Department and helped run various divisions of the agency, most notably launching a successful campaign to change the way New Yorkers obey the leash law. Tusk later returned to serve as Senior Advisor to New York City Parks Commissioner Henry Stern.

Tusk then joined U.S. Senator Chuck Schumer as Communications Director from 2000-2002, handling communications, strategy, and policy for the Senator, most notably in the aftermath of the September 11 terrorist attacks on New York City.

In 2009, Tusk was named campaign manager for Michael Bloomberg's bid for a third term as Mayor of New York City. After Bloomberg's re-election, Tusk joined his administration Michael Bloomberg, as special advisor to the mayor, where he led a successful effort to re-write the New York City Charter to allow Bloomberg to serve a third term. He also assisted with creating the Mayor's campaign promise index, making Bloomberg the nation's first public official to publicly report the status of each campaign promise.

Tusk returned to New York City politics a decade later as an advisor and strategist for Andrew Yang's campaign in the 2021 New York City mayoral election, playing a unique role as both co-campaign managers were employees of his firm. One critic from government group Reinvent Albany said that Tusk could be a shadow mayor for New York. Tusk responded to the allegations, and said he would not lobby a Yang administration. After Yang lost by an unexpectedly wide margin, Yang's former advisers criticized Tusk Strategies for avoiding freewheeling press conferences that were a feature of his Presidential campaign.

=== Illinois ===
In 2003, Governor Rod Blagojevich appointed Tusk to be Deputy Governor of Illinois. In the position, Tusk failed to file required financial disclosure reports on at least three occasions. Tusk has said that he thinks Blagojevich may have hired him believing that because of his relative youth and inexperience he wouldn't notice the scams Blagojevich's administration was pulling. In 2006, Tusk resigned; three years later, Blagojevich was impeached and removed from office. Tusk testified as a witness in the criminal trial of Blagojevich, which ended in Blagojevich's conviction, recounting the occasion when Blagojevich asked him to hold up a government grant until a fundraiser was held. Tusk said at trial that he put a stop to the plans and reported the incident to the chief ethics officer.

Among the accomplishments Tusk cites from his time as deputy governor are efforts to make Illinois the first state to guarantee health care for all children, the first state to offer pre-school to all 3- and 4-year olds, the first state to import prescription drugs from Europe and Canada, and the first state to convert its entire tollway system to Open Road Tolling.

== Private sector ==
After serving as Deputy Governor of Illinois, Tusk was hired as a senior vice president at Lehman Brothers, where he created the lottery monetization group and headed all of its efforts regarding U.S. based lotteries. Combining his backgrounds in finance and politics, Tusk developed a successful framework to help states monetize their lotteries.

In 2015, Tusk ran a public affairs campaign for Uber that included television, radio, and digital ads as well as direct mail and grassroots organizing in opposition to a cap on rideshare vehicles proposed by New York City Mayor Bill de Blasio. The campaign argued that "the company was good for the city, providing jobs and transportation for less affluent residents in the outer boroughs". The bill was dropped before it reached a vote. After the campaign's success in New York City, Tusk moved onto other places like Boston, Philadelphia, Chicago, Miami, Los Angeles, Denver, and Washington D.C. For his representation of Uber, Tusk was compensated with equity in the company estimated to be worth $100 million. The experience also provided him with exposure to the world of venture capital, and Tusk Ventures was launched two weeks after the New York City victory.

In 2022, Tusk opened a bookstore on the Lower East Side called P&T Knitwear. In addition to being a bookstore, P&T Knitwear also has a podcast studio and an 80-seat amphitheater.

=== Tusk Strategies ===
In 2011 Tusk founded Tusk Strategies, which is the first firm dedicated to helping startups navigate political issues and is based in New York City. The firm develops and runs campaigns for companies, including Google, Walmart, AT&T, Pepsi, FanDuel, and institutions including Stanford University, the Rockefeller Foundation and Texas A&M, and individuals including Michael Bloomberg and George Lucas.

Tusk Strategies also conducts issue advocacy campaigns around education reform and government; campaigns to help political candidates, non-profits and trade associations.

In June 2025, the nonprofit watchdog Common Cause New York filed a formal complaint with the New York City Campaign Finance Board alleging that Tusk Strategies, led by CEO Chris Coffey and Head of the New York Practice Shontell Smith, provided unreported in-kind contributions to Andrew Cuomo’s mayoral campaign. The complaint cited two public opinion polls commissioned by Tusk Strategies, both before and after Cuomo's campaign launch, suggesting these may have been coordinated with the campaign in ways that would violate spending caps and disclosure rules.

A campaign spokesperson, Rich Azzopardi, dismissed the complaint as “an attempt at lawfare and election interference.”

=== Tusk Venture Partners ===
In 2015, Tusk launched Tusk Ventures Partners, a venture capital fund that invests in startups facing political and regulatory challenges or pursuing political and governmental opportunities. His work with startups began in 2011, when he worked with transportation startup Uber, which was contesting with regulation proposed by the Taxi and Limousine Commission (CE) of New York City.

Tusk Venture Partners has worked with over three dozen startups including Bird, FanDuel, Lemonade, Handy, Eaze, Nexar, GlamSquad, Ripple, MainStreet, Nurx, Ro, Kodiak Robotics, pymetrics, Grove and Care/Of, solving a variety of political, regulatory and media challenges solely in return for equity in each company and for investment rights in each company's next round of financing.

Tusk Venture Partners 1 raised its first fund in 2016 and began deploying capital into startups including Lemonade, Nexar, Care/Of, Circle, Coinbase, Bird, Ro and FanDuel.

=== Ivory Gaming Group ===
Ivory Gaming Group was co-founded by Bradley Tusk and Christian Goode in 2015 to reopen the Chukchansi Gold Resort & Casino.

== Tusk Philanthropies ==
Tusk created Tusk Philanthropies. In 2017, Tusk Philanthropies launched an initiative to popularize the need for mobile voting to citizens and elected officials across the country. The services Tusk has backed so far are for development of internet-based voting systems. David L. Dill of Verified Voting, and the National Election Defense Coalition have expressed skepticism of these efforts, based on their belief that any internet-based voting system would be vulnerable to manipulation, either by hackers or by the company owning the system. Tusk Philanthropies announced a $10 million grant in 2021 for the development of internet-based voting.

Tusk founded Tusk Philanthropies' Solving Hunger, which assists school meal programs.

== Published works ==
In 2018, Tusk wrote The Fixer: My Adventures Saving Startups from Death by Politics (published by Penguin Group). According to some colleagues, the book "takes more credit than he deserves" for Tusk's political consulting achievements.

Tusk authored a novel called Obvious in Hindsight that he called a "slightly absurdist take" on his career working with Uber. The novel was published in 2023 and is about a campaign to legalize flying cars.

== P&T Knitwear Bookstore, Coffee, & Podcast Studio ==
P&T Knitwear Bookstore is an independent bookstore, event space, cafe, and freely-available podcast studio located on the Lower East Side of Manhattan, opened by Tusk in 2022. The store, according to Tusk on his Firewall podcast, is operated as public good and losses money. Among other podcasts, the nonprofit The City Reporter hosts its podcasts there . According to the bookstore website:

"In 1952, founder Bradley Tusk's grandfather, Hymie Tusk, and his business partner Mike Pudlo opened the original P&T Knitwear, a small shop selling sweaters and collared shirts at 37½ Allen Street in New York… The two men survived the Holocaust and met in a Displaced Persons Camp in Germany after the war. They emigrated to the US, determined to create better lives for themselves and their families through sheer grit and hustle. When they first opened on the Lower East Side, Pudlo and Tusk couldn't even afford enough merchandise to fill the store. They stocked the shelves with empty boxes, hoping to give the illusion of a bustling business. Soon, their creativity and fearlessness paid off. Today's P&T Knitwear honors our namesake by giving back to the very same neighborhood that made Tusk and Pudlo's story, and so many others' like them, possible."

== See also ==
- Trump Statue Initiative
