= 1926 Liechtenstein fire insurance referendum =

- 7 February 1926
- Referendum on whether a state insurance scheme for fire damage should be established

Results
Choice	Votes	%
Yes	663	34.19%
No	1,276	65.81%
Valid votes	1,939	97.44%
Invalid or blank votes	51	2.56%
Total votes	1,990	100.00%
Registered voters/turnout	2,232	89.16%

A referendum on fire insurance was held in Liechtenstein on 7 February 1926. Voters were asked whether a state insurance scheme for fire damage should be established. The proposal was rejected by 66% of voters.

== Results ==
Choice	Votes	%
For	663	34.19
Against	1,276	65.81
Total	1,939	100.00
Valid votes	1,939	97.44
Invalid/blank votes	51	2.56
Total votes	1,990	100.00
Registered voters/turnout	2,232	89.16
Source: Nohlen & Stöver
