= Home insurance =

Type of property insurance that covers a private residence

Home insurance, also commonly called homeowners insurance (often abbreviated in the US real estate industry as HOI (Note: Among costs escrowed into a monthly mortgage payment, "HOI" (homeowners insurance premium) is not to be confused with "HOA" (homeowners association fee))), is a type of property insurance that covers a private residence. It is an insurance policy that combines various personal insurance protections, which can include losses occurring to one's home, its contents, loss of use (additional living expenses), or loss of other personal possessions of the homeowner, as well as liability insurance for accidents that may happen at the home or at the hands of the homeowner within the policy territory.

Additionally, homeowners insurance provides financial protection against disasters. A standard home insurance policy covers the home and the belongings inside it.

== Overview ==
Homeowners policy is a multiple-line insurance policy, meaning that it includes both property insurance and liability coverage, with an indivisible premium, meaning that a single premium is paid for all risks. This means that it covers damage to one's property and liability for any injuries and property damage caused by the owner or members of his/her family to other people. It may also include damage caused by household pets. The U.S. uses standardized policy forms that divide coverage into several categories. Coverage limits are typically provided as a percentage of the primary Coverage A, which is coverage for the main dwelling.

The cost of homeowners insurance often depends on what it would cost to replace the house and which additional endorsements or riders are attached to the policy. The insurance policy is a legal contract between the insurance carrier (insurance company) and the named insured(s). It is a contract of indemnity and will put the insured back to their state before the loss. Typically, claims due to floods or war (whose definition typically includes a nuclear explosion from any source) are excluded from coverage, amongst other standard exclusions (like termites). Special insurance, including flood insurance, can be purchased for these possibilities. Insurance is adjusted to reflect the replacement cost, usually upon applying an inflation factor or a cost index.

=== Pricing ===
Major factors in price estimation include location, coverage, and the amount of insurance, which is based on the estimated cost to rebuild the home ("replacement cost").

If insufficient coverage is purchased to rebuild the home, the claim's payout may be subject to a co-insurance penalty. In this scenario, the insured will be subject to an out-of-pocket fee as a penalty. Insurers use vendors to estimate the costs, including CoreLogic subsidiary Marshall Swift-Boeckh, Verisk PropertyProfile, and E2Value, but leave the responsibility ultimately up to the consumer. In 2013, a survey found that about 60% of homes are undervalued by an estimated 17 percent. In some cases, estimates can be too low because of "demand surge" after a catastrophe. As a safeguard against a wrong estimate, some insurers offer "guaranteed replacement cost (GRC)", and "extended replacement cost" add-ons ("endorsements") which provide extra coverage if the limit is reached.

Prices may be lower if the house is situated next to a fire station or is equipped with fire sprinklers and fire alarms; if the house exhibits wind mitigation measures, such as hurricane shutters; or if the house has a security system and has insurer-approved locks installed.

Typically payment is made annually. Perpetual insurance, which continues indefinitely, can also be obtained in certain areas.

=== Covered perils ===
Home insurance offers coverage on a "named perils" and "open perils" basis. A "named perils" policy is one that provides coverage for a loss specifically listed on the policy; if it's not listed, then it's not covered. An "open perils" policy is broader in the sense that it will provide coverage for all losses except those expressly excluded from the policy.

For insurance policies that cover specific named perils, the insurer frequently offers a choice between one policy covering a basic set of specific perils and another covering the same basic set plus several additional perils, as discussed below. Together with an open peril, a.k.a. "special form" policy, these two groupings of named perils allow the insurer to offer a choice among three types of policy, with three levels of coverage, which can be priced in a fair and accurate manner and appeal to a variety of resident homeowners as well as owners of apartment buildings and condominium associations.

Basic "named perils" – this is the least comprehensive of the three coverage options. It provides protection against perils most likely to result in a total loss. It is not covered if something happens to the home that's not on the list below. This type of policy is most common in countries with developing insurance markets and as protection for vacant or unoccupied buildings.

Basic-form covered perils:

- Fire
- Lightning
- Windstorm or hail
- Explosion
- Smoke
- Vandalism
- Aircraft or vehicle collision
- Riot or civil commotion

Broad "named perils" – this form expands on the "basic form" by adding 6 more covered perils. Again, this is a "named perils" policy. The loss must specifically be listed to receive coverage. Fortunately, the "broad form" is designed to cover the most common forms of property damage.

Broad-form covered perils:

- All basic-form perils
- Burglary, break-in damage
- Falling objects (e.g. tree limbs)
- Weight of ice and snow
- Freezing of plumbing
- Accidental water damage
- Artificially generated electricity

Special "all risk" – special-form coverage is the most inclusive of the three options. The difference with "special form" policies is that they cover all losses unless specifically excluded. Unlike the prior forms, all unlisted perils are covered perils. However, if something happens to the home, and the event is on the exclusions list, the policy will not provide coverage.

Special-form excluded perils:

- Ordinance of law
- Earthquake
- Flood
- Power failure
- Neglect
- War
- Nuclear hazard
- Intentional acts

== In the United States ==
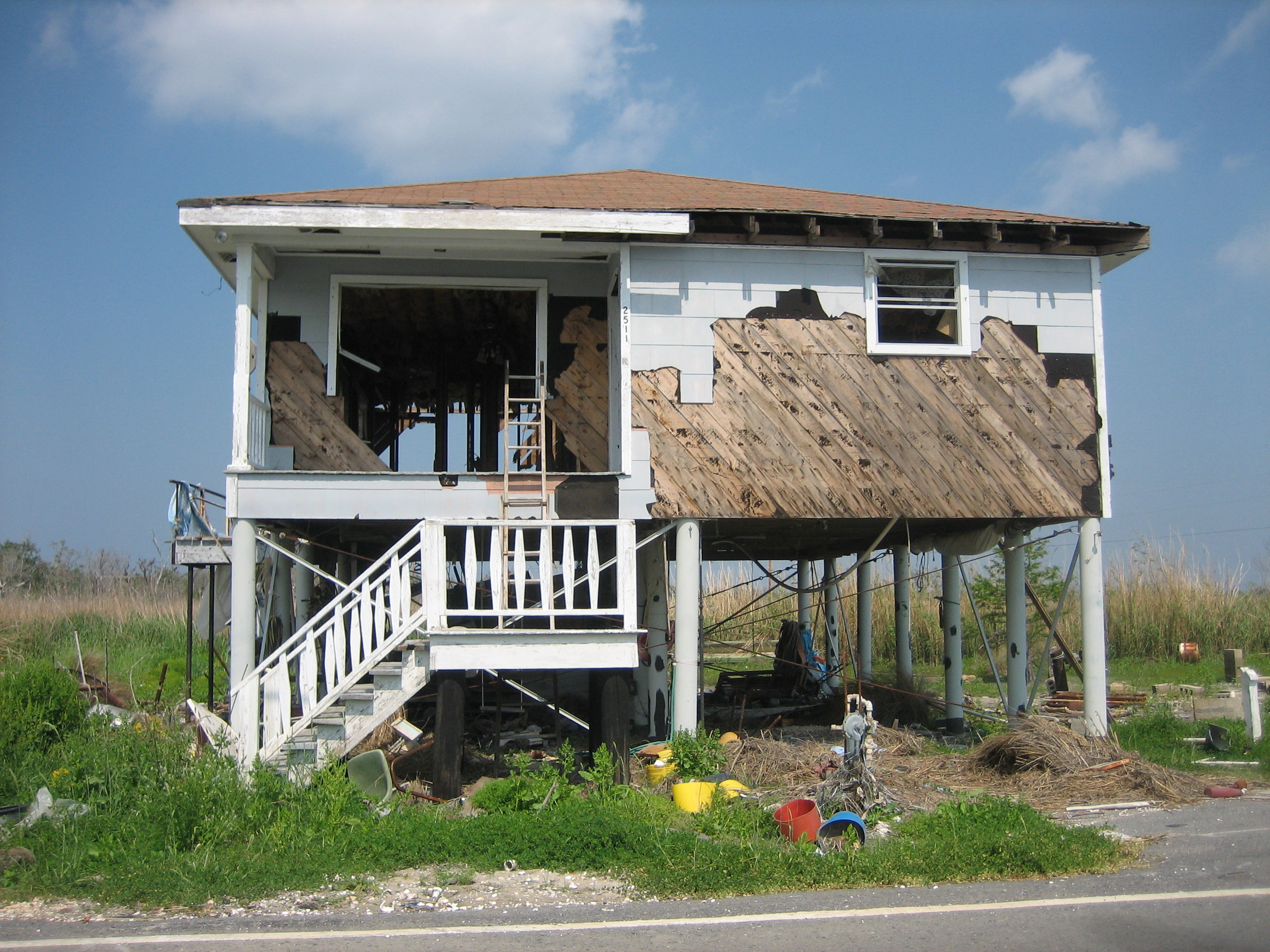
A home in Louisiana damaged by Hurricane Katrina

In the United States, most home buyers borrow money in the form of a mortgage loan, and the mortgage lender often requires that the buyer purchase homeowners insurance as a condition of the loan, in order to protect the bank if the home is destroyed. Anyone with an insurable interest in the property should be listed on the policy. In some cases the mortgagee will waive the need for the mortgagor to carry homeowners insurance if the value of the land exceeds the amount of the mortgage balance. In such a case even the total destruction of any buildings would not affect the ability of the lender to be able to foreclose and recover the full amount of the loan.

Home insurance in the United States may differ from other countries; for example, in Britain, subsidence and subsequent foundation failure is usually covered under an insurance policy. United States insurance companies used to offer foundation insurance, which was reduced to coverage for damage due to leaks, and finally eliminated altogether. The insurance is often misunderstood by its purchasers; for example, many believe that mold is covered when it is not a standard coverage. Further complicating matters is that the homeowners insurance industry is largely regulated at the state level rather than nationwide.

=== History ===
Modern home insurance is a 20th-century phenomenon, but insurance against damage to one’s home is centuries old. The first predecessors of modern home insurance were fire insurance policies, which protected against what was then the most common peril to befall buildings. Fire insurance was created by Nicholas Barbon, who opened an insurance firm in London in 1681, in the aftermath of the Great Fire of London of 1666, which had made property owners acutely aware of the risk of fire, initially insuring 5,000 homes. In the wake of his success, many other insurance firms, such as the Hand in Hand Fire and Life Insurance Society (founded 1696), were created. The Sun Fire Office, created in 1710, is the oldest still existing insurance company in the world.

The first homeowners policy per se in the United States was introduced in September 1950, but similar policies had already existed in Great Britain and certain areas of the United States. In the late 1940s, US insurance law was reformed and during this process multiple line statutes were written, allowing homeowners policies to become legal.

Prior to the 1950s there were separate policies for the various perils that could affect a home. A homeowner would have had to purchase separate policies covering fire losses, theft, personal property, and the like. During the 1950s policy forms were developed allowing the homeowner to purchase all the insurance they needed on one complete policy. However, these policies varied by insurance company, and were difficult to comprehend.

The need for standardization grew so great that a private company based in Jersey City, New Jersey, Insurance Services Office, also known as the ISO, was formed in 1971 to provide risk information and it issued simplified homeowners policy forms for reselling to insurance companies. These policies have been amended over the years.

Modern developments have changed the insurance coverage terms, availability, and pricing. In particular, rising premiums has led to many homeowners significantly under-insuring their properties. Homeowners insurance has been relatively unprofitable, due in part to catastrophes such as hurricanes as well as regulators' reluctance to authorize price increases. Coverages have been reduced instead and companies have diverged from the former standardized model ISO forms. Water damage due to burst pipes in particular has been restricted or in some cases entirely eliminated. Other restrictions included time limits, complex replacement cost calculations (which may not reflect the true cost to replace), and reductions in wind damage coverage.

=== Types of homeowners insurance policies ===
According to a 2018 National Association of Insurance Commissioners (NAIC) report on data from 2016, 73.8% of homes were covered by owner-occupied homeowners policies. Of these, 79.52% had an HO-3 Special policy, and 13.35% had the more expensive HO-5 Comprehensive. Both of these policies are "all risks" or "open perils", meaning that they cover all perils except those specifically excluded. Homes covered by an HO-2 Broad policy accounted for 5.15%, which covers only specific named perils. The remaining 2% includes the HO-1 Basic and the HO-8 Modified policies, which are the most limited in the coverage offered. HO-8, also known as older home insurance, is likely to pay only actual cash value for damages rather than replacement.

The remaining 21.3% of home insurance policies were covered by renter's or condominium insurance. 14.8% of these had the HO-4 Contents Broad form, also known as renters' insurance, which covers the contents of an apartment not specifically covered in the blanket policy written for the complex. This policy can also cover liability arising from injury to guests as well as negligence of the renter within the coverage territory. Common coverage areas are events such as lightning, riot, aircraft, explosion, vandalism, smoke, theft, windstorm or hail, falling objects, volcanic eruption, snow, sleet, and weight of ice. The remainder had the HO-6 Unit-Owners policy, also known as a condominium insurance, which is designed for the owners of condos and includes coverage for the part of the building owned by the insured and for the property housed therein. Designed to span the gap between the coverage provided by the blanket policy written for the entire neighborhood or building and the personal property inside the home. The condominium association's by-laws may determine the total amount of insurance necessary. E.g., in Florida, the scope of coverage is prescribed by statute – 718.111(11)(f).

=== Collateral protection insurance ===
If a home can not be insured, obtaining a mortgage on it is difficult or impossible. If the homeowners insurance is canceled after a mortgage agreement is in force, and the home judged to be uninsurable, a standard mortgage contract that compels homeowners insurance allows the lender to purchase collateral protection insurance, (sometimes called "force-placed insurance") and charge the premiums to the homeowner via escrow. CPI's pay off the balance owed on the mortgage if the homeowner defaults on mortgage payments, and some will cover damage to the home that impacts the resale value. This repair coverage can benefit the homeowner, but by design the contractual benefits flow to the mortgagee. If the structure is deemed uninsurable, the homeowner also benefits from not having the mortgage called in by the lender - without CPI the homeowner would be in serious breach of his contractual obligations.

=== Causes of loss ===
According to the 2008 Insurance Information Institute factbook, for every $100 of premium, in 2005 on average $16 went to fire and lightning, $30 to wind and hail, $11 to water damage and freezing, $4 for other causes, and $2 for theft. An additional $3 went to liability and medical payments and $9 for claims settlement expenses, and the remaining $25 was allocated to insurer expenses. One study of fires found that most were caused by heating incidents, although smoking was a risk factor for fatal fires.

=== Claims process ===
After a loss, the insured is expected to take steps to mitigate the loss. Insurance policies typically require the insurer to be notified within a reasonable period. After that, a claims adjuster will investigate the claim, and the insured may be required to provide various information.

Filing a claim may result in an increase in rates, nonrenewal, or cancellation. In addition, insurers may share the claim data in an industry database (the two major ones are CLUE and A-PLUS), with Claim Loss Underwriting Exchange (CLUE) by Choicepoint receiving data from 98% of U.S. insurers.

=== Cost impact of weather disasters ===
According to data from the National Oceanic and Atmospheric Administration (NOAA), damages from weather-related disasters in the United States amounted to approximately $92.9 billion in 2023. Over recent years, these events' increasing frequency and severity have impacted the insurance industry.

From 2020 to 2023, insurance costs rose by 13 percent, influenced by several factors. Notably, areas frequently affected by disasters have seen higher insurance premiums. A key contributor to these rising costs is increased reinsurance expenses. Reinsurance, which is insurance purchased by insurance companies to mitigate their own risk, saw its costs double from 2017 to 2023. For the fifth consecutive year, these companies have incurred more in payouts than they collected in premiums. In 2023, insurers disbursed $1.11 in claims for every dollar received in premiums, indicating a financial strain within the home insurance sector.

According to Swiss Re, global insured losses due to natural disasters are expected to reach $107 billion in 2025.

== In the United Kingdom ==
As in the US, mortgage lenders within the United Kingdom (UK) require the rebuild value (the actual cost of rebuilding a property to its current state should it be damaged or destroyed) of a property to be covered as a condition of the loan. However, the rebuild cost is often lower than the market value of the property, as the market value often reflects the property as a going concern, as opposed to just the value of the bricks and mortar.

A number of factors, such as an increase in fraud and increasingly unpredictable weather, have seen home insurance premiums continue to rise in the UK. For this reason, there has been a shift in how home insurance is bought in the UK—as customers become a lot more price-sensitive, there has been a large increase in the amount of policies sold through price comparison sites.

In addition to standard home insurance, some 8 million households in the UK are categorized as being a "non-standard" risk. These households require a specialist or non-standard insurer that would cover home insurance needs for people that have criminal convictions and/or where the property suffers subsidence or has previously been underpinned.

== In Canada ==
As in other countries, mortgage lenders in Canada require properties be covered by active home insurance policies throughout the lifetime of the loan repayment. Home insurance in Canada can be divided into three subcategories: homeowners insurance, which includes both building and contents coverage; tenant insurance, which excludes building coverage; and condo insurance, which includes coverage requirements unique to owners of condominium units. Providers in Canada offer all-risk home insurance policies, commonly called “comprehensive.” These cover all losses that are not specifically excluded by the policy.

Home insurance pricing in Canada has been impacted by an increased frequency of destructive natural disasters within the past decade. Wildfires and floods have caused tens of billions of dollars in insured damage since 2013, which has necessitated increases in insurance premiums.

== Around the world ==
Premium volume by country (2013)

| World rank | Country | Region | Premium volume (2013, USD Mil): |
|---|---|---|---|
| 1 | United States | Americas | 1,259,255 |
| 2 | Japan | Asia | 531,506 |
| 3 | United Kingdom | Europe | 329,643 |
| 4 | China | Asia | 277,965 |
| 5 | France | Europe | 254,754 |
| 6 | Germany | Europe | 247,162 |
| 7 | Italy | Europe | 168,544 |
| 8 | South Korea | Asia | 145,427 |
| 9 | Canada | Americas | 125,344 |
| 10 | Netherlands | Europe | 101,140 |

Building and contents coverage

Countries such as China, Australia, and the United Kingdom use a more straightforward approach to home insurance, called "building and contents coverage" commonly referred to as "home and contents insurance". Relative to the insurance policies of the United States, building and contents coverage offers a very basic level of coverage. Most standard policies only cover the most basic perils listed below:

- Storm or flood
- Fire
- Lightning or explosion
- Falling trees or branches
- Subsidence, drag or landslip
- Breakage of glass or sanitary fittings
- Damage from escaped water or oil
- Shock caused to the house by animals, vehicles or aircraft

Building coverage

Building covers both the primary structure as well as detached structures such as garages, sheds, and back houses that are on property. However, different insurers may not cover things like boundary walls, fences, gates, paths, drives or swimming pools, so it is important to check the specific policy language. This is an equivalent of both Coverage A and B in homeowners insurance policies in the United States.

Contents coverage

Contents insurance covers personal effects such as furniture, clothes, electronics, jewelry, etc. Most policies limit the individual amount of money paid out for each category of items. Individual policies can vary in the amount of coverage they provide. The option to schedule personal property is readily available.

Liability coverage

Liability is typically bundled together with building and contents coverage. Injuries and damage on premises would be covered by building coverage liability while any offsite occurrences would be covered under contents coverage.

Common exclusions

As with most insurance policies, there are always exclusions. The most common are:

- General wear-and-tear maintenance
- Faulty workmanship
- Mechanical or electrical breakdown
- Any amount over the limits shown on the policy schedule or in the policy
- Restricted cover when the home is empty or is let to tenants

== See also ==
- Mortgage insurance
- Home equity protection
- Owner-controlled insurance program
- Property insurance
- Renters insurance
