= Ella Elvira Gibson =

First woman to serve as military chaplain in the U.S. military

Ella Gibson
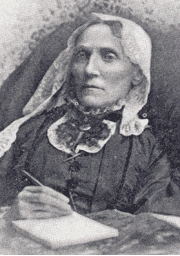
- Born: Elvira Gibson; 8 May 1821; Winchendon, Mass., US
- Died: 8 March 1901 (aged 79); Barre, Massachusetts, US
- Other names: Ella Hobart, Ellen Hobart, Ellen Gibson
- Occupations: Chaplain, writer, lecturer
- Known for: First woman military chaplain in the United States
- Spouse(s): Rev. John Hobart (m. 1861-1868 div.)

Elvira "Ella"/"Ellen" Gibson Hobart (8 May 1821 – 8 March 1901) was the first woman to serve as a military chaplain in the United States military. She served during the American Civil War but was not recognized for her service until 2002. She also wrote and lectured on abolitionism and other issues.

== Biography ==
Gibson worked as a teacher in Rindge, New Hampshire and became known for her writings and lecturing on abolition and other issues. She married Rev. John Hobart in 1861 and became a chaplain for the 8th Wisconsin Volunteer Infantry Regiment in the American Civil War, also known as the "Live Eagle Regiment". In 1864, Gibson became an ordained minister and served the 1st Wisconsin Regiment of Heavy Artillery, but was not recognized by then Secretary of War Edwin Stanton because she was a woman. After the war, Gibson even had trouble getting paid for her work, and did not receive any pay until 1876. To support herself, she continued writing, often on women's issues, for such periodicals as The Truth Seeker, The Boston Investigator, The Ironclad Age, and The Moralist.

After she divorced John Hobart in 1868, she returned to using her maiden name.

She was posthumously given the rank of captain in the Chaplains Corps of the U.S. Army with the passage of Senate Bill 1438 in 2002.

== See also ==
- Dianna Pohlman Bell
