= Metromile =

Technology start-up based in San Francisco

Metromile, Inc.

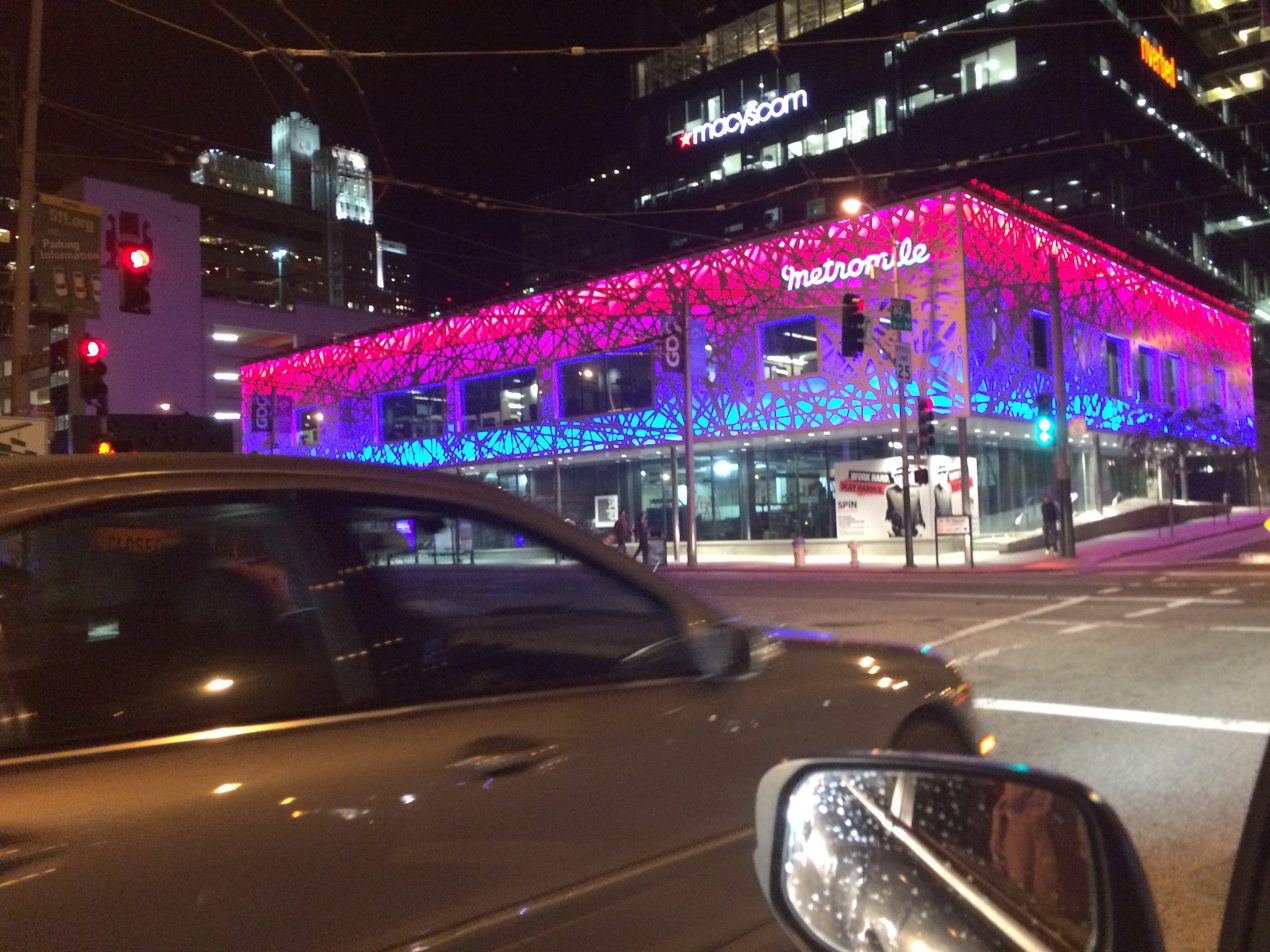
- Metromile building at night, San Francisco
- Company type: Subsidiary
- Traded as: Nasdaq: MILE
- Industry: Technology
- Founded: 2011; 14 years ago, in Redwood City, California
- Founders: David Friedberg; Steve Pretre
- Headquarters: 425 Market Street, San Francisco, California, U.S.
- Areas served: California, Illinois, New Jersey, Pennsylvania, Virginia, Washington, Arizona, Oregon
- Key people: Dan Preston (CEO)
- Products: Pay-per-mile insurance, driving app
- Revenue: ▲US$104.9 million (2021)
- Operating income: ▼US$−197.7 million (2021)
- Net income: ▼US$−216.4 million (2021)
- Total assets: ▲US$313.4 million (2021)
- Total equity: ▲US$186.4 million (2021)
- Number of employees: 384 (2021)
- Parent: Lemonade, Inc.
- Website: metromile.com

Metromile, Inc. is a technology start-up based in San Francisco that provides pay-per-mile car insurance. The company also licenses its digital insurance platform to insurance companies worldwide and offers a digitally native product that includes smart driving features, automated claims, and vehicle information. In July 2022, Metromile was acquired by Lemonade, Inc.

== Pay-per-mile insurance ==
Pay-per-mile insurance is a type of usage-based auto insurance where policyholders pay a base rate plus a per-mile fee. It is designed for low-mileage drivers and calculates costs based solely on distance driven, without considering driving behavior. This model contrasts with other usage-based insurance programs that assess factors such as speed, braking, or time of travel. To measure mileage, the Metromile Pulse device is plugged into the onboard diagnostic (OBD-II) port of the car. The OBD-II port is the same port that mechanics use to diagnose issues that trigger a car’s “check engine” light. The device then transmits mileage data to servers. Metromile provides a full customer service team and 24/7 claims team. Metromile began underwriting its own policies in September 2016.

Per-mile insurance through Metromile is currently available in Arizona, California, Illinois, New Jersey, Oregon, Pennsylvania, Virginia, and Washington. Drivers in other states can add themselves to a waitlist to be notified as additional states become available. Metromile is only offering personal car insurance policies at this time.

== Driving app ==
The Pulse device provided to per-mile insurance customers also collects data about trips and car health. Metromile visualizes this information in an app to give drivers insights that can simplify car ownership. Features include street sweeping alerts, where the driver is notified if their car is parked in a street sweeping zone, and a car health monitor. The car locator feature shows where a car is parked, and some users have recovered their stolen vehicles by knowing their car’s location. The app is currently available for both Apple iOS and Google Android phones.

In June 2015, the Metromile Tag was introduced to give non-insurance customers a way to also use the driving app. The Tag wirelessly connects to smartphones via Apple iBeacon technology.

== History ==
Metromile was founded in Redwood City, California, in 2011 by David Friedberg and Steve Pretre. David Friedberg currently sits as the chairman of the board, and the company is led by CEO Dan Preston. In 2013, the company moved its headquarters to San Francisco and in April 2015 added a second office space. A new location was opened in Boston in April 2015 and in Tempe in May 2015. In September 2016 they announced a new round of $192 million in funding and acquired a carrier which enabled them to start underwriting their own policies. The company became publicly listed in February 2021 in a reverse merger deal, supported by Betsy Z. Cohen who also joined the company’s board of directors.

On November 8, 2021, Lemonade, Inc. announced that it would acquire Metromile in an all-stock transaction, which implied a fully diluted equity value of approximately $500 million, or around $200 million net of cash. The acquisition completed on 28 July 2022. Following the acquisition, Lemonade laid off 20% of Metromile's staff.

== See also ==
- Usage-based insurance
- Vehicle insurance
