= Markel Group =

US financial services company

Markel Group Inc.
- Type: Public
- Traded as: NYSE: MKL; Russell 1000 Component
- Industry: Holding company
- Founded: 1930; 96 years ago
- Founder: Samuel A. Markel
- Headquarters: Richmond, Virginia, U.S.
- Area served: Virginia; United Kingdom; Europe; Asia Pacific; Canada
- Key people: Steven A. Markel (chairman); Thomas S. Gayner (CEO)
- Revenue: ▲US$12.846 Billion (Fiscal Year Ended December 31, 2021)
- Operating income: ▲US$3.243 Billion (Fiscal Year Ended December 31, 2021)
- Net income: ▲US$2.447 Billion (Fiscal Year Ended December 31, 2021)
- Total assets: ▲US$48.448 Billion (Fiscal Year Ended December 31, 2021)
- Total equity: ▲US$14.695 Billion (Fiscal Year Ended December 31, 2021)
- Number of employees: 17,400 (2019)
- Subsidiaries: State National Companies
- Website: www.mklgroup.com

Markel Group Inc. is a group of companies headquartered in Richmond, Virginia, and originally founded in 1930 as an insurance company.

== History ==
Company founder Samuel A. Markel formed the Mutual Casualty Association and established the Mutual Casualty Company in Norfolk, Virginia. The company headquarters later moved to Richmond, Virginia. Sam Markel's four sons, Lewis, Irvin, Stanley, and Milton, joined the business in the 1930s, and Markel Service, Inc. was created. During this time, Markel was actively involved in efforts to develop safety and other standards aimed at legitimizing the growing bus and trucking industries. Markel also assisted in passing the National Motor Carrier Act of 1935.

By the 1940s, Markel Service, Inc. earned a national following and developed a reputation for industry-leading claims adjusting and safety engineering. American Fidelity & Casualty, a sister company covering fleets of trucks and buses, also became the largest insurer of these risks in the United States. In 1980, the company became an insurance carrier when Essex Insurance Company was incorporated and licensed to write excess and surplus lines business.

In 1986, the Markel Corporation was listed on the NASDAQ exchange, with an IPO offered at $8.33 per share. The company's trading was moved to the NYSE in 1997. Markel gained access to specialty international markets in 2000, when Terra Nova Holdings, Ltd. was acquired and the London office opened. Branch offices later opened in the UK, Europe, Asia Pacific, and Canada. With a "permanent capital" investing approach, Markel Ventures acquired AMF Bakery Systems in 2005 and continued to acquire other varied and scalable businesses. With the $3.1 billion acquisition of Alterra Capital Holdings Limited, Markel added two additional insurance divisions, Markel Global and Markel Reinsurance.

In 2015, Markel acquired Bermuda-based CATCo, a specialist investment management business; and Markel Ventures announced a majority interest in CapTech.

In 2023, Markel Corporation changed its name to Markel Group Inc. Markel is headquartered in Richmond, Virginia, with 76 offices in 18 countries.

=== Timeline ===
Beginning in 1930, Markel established Markel Service, a separate company to handle direct and reinsurance of American Fidelity & Casualty.

In 1951, the company expanded into Canada by founding Markel Service Canada, Ltd., headquartered in Toronto, Ontario.

In 1959, the national claims division of American Fidelity & Casualty became National Claims Service, an independent adjuster that could be contracted by other insurance firms. The Safety Engineering Division also began offering services to other firms.

The company later expanded beyond truck and bus companies, led by the third generation of Markels: Anthony, Steve, and Gary.

In 1980, the company founded Essex Insurance Company in Delaware. Essex began as a property insurance company in White Bear Lake, Minnesota, but later moved to Richmond, Virginia.

In 1985, Prem Watsa took control of Markel Financial Holdings, a Canadian-based trucking insurance company. Near bankruptcy, Watsa determined it needed a capital injection.

In December 1986, Markel Corp. held its first IPO at $8.33 per share, valuing the company at $15 million. Shares traded on the NASDAQ.

In 1987, Markel reorganized Markel Financial Holdings (Canada) and renamed it Fairfax Financial Holdings Ltd., short for "fair, friendly acquisitions."

In December 1987, Markel Corp. acquired half of Shand Morahan & Company, an underwriter in Deerfield, Illinois.

In December 1990, Markel completed its acquisition of Shand. As part of the Shand acquisition, Markel Corp. also acquired American Underwriting Managers, an insurance underwriter in Pewaukee, Wisconsin, specializing in personal boat and motorcycle insurance.

In 1989, Markel Corp. acquired the Rhulen Agency of Monticello, New York. Rhulen is a specialty insurer for children's summer camps and youth organizations. Rhulen was later moved to Richmond, Virginia, and renamed Markel Insurance Company.

In the Spring of 1997, Markel Corp. trading moved to the NYSE.

In January 2000, Markel Corp. founded Markel Southwest Underwriters in Scottsdale, Arizona, after buying the Arizona policies of Acceptance Insurance Company.

In March 2000, Markel Corp. completed the acquisition of Terra Nova (Bermuda) Holdings Ltd.

In October 2009, Elliott Special Risks LP (ESR) was purchased by Markel International, a London-based specialty property and casualty insurer that runs the international operations of Markel Corp.

On October 30, 2009, Markel Ventures, Inc. acquired Panel Specialists, LLC., a manufacturer of panels, wall systems, casework, furniture, and countertops and other stone-related products.

On December 2, 2009, Markel Ventures, Inc. acquired a majority interest in Ellicott Dredge Enterprises, LLC, a company which manufactures dredging equipment for both domestic and international markets.

On May 10, 2010, at the Markel Corp. Annual Meeting, it was reported there would be a new management structure approved by the Board. Alan I. Kirshner would remain chairman and chief executive officer while Anthony F. Markel and Steven A. Markel would still serve as vice chairman. Reporting to them would be a three-member Office of the President. Thomas S. Gayner became president and chief investment officer, while Richard R. Whitt, III and F. Michael Crowley became president and co-chief operating officers.

On May 11, 2010, Markel Ventures, Inc. acquired Solbern, LLC, a manufacturer of food processing equipment for both the domestic and international markets.

In July 2010, Markel Corp. acquired Aspen Holdings, Inc. of Omaha, Nebraska.

In April 2011, Markel (UK) Limited launched Markel Direct, an online direct to customer distribution channel for specialist insurance.

On July 14, 2011, Markel Corp. acquired PartnerMD, LLC, a company which provides concierge medicine, a type of membership health-care service in which patients pay an annual fee for enhanced care that includes disease-prevention, health-maintenance, and around-the-clock access to a physician.

On October 19, 2011, Markel Ventures, Inc. acquired a majority interest in WI Holdings, Inc. ("Weldship") which manufactures, leases and sells high pressure tube trailers, certified ISO containers and other gas and liquid containers to industrial gas manufacturers, independent distributors, specialty chemical companies and the United States Government for use in the domestic and international compressed gas, electronic gas and specialty chemical industries.

On January 4, 2012, Markel Corp. completed the acquisition of Thompson Insurance Enterprises, a privately held program administrator underwriting multi-line, industry-focused insurance programs.

In February 2012, Markel's Camp Insurance Program joined forces with CampDoc.com, an electronic health record system for camps.

In June 2012, Markel Direct expanded product range into charity and community group risks.

In October 2012, Markel purchased Essentia Insurance Company.

On May 1, 2013, Markel Corporation completed its acquisition of Alterra Capital Holdings Limited.

On August 16, 2013, Markel Ventures, Inc. acquired Eagle Construction of VA.

In January 2014, Markel Corp. acquired Abbey Protection plc, an integrated specialty insurance and consultancy group headquartered in London.

On July 23, 2014, Markel Ventures, Inc. acquired majority interest in Cottrell, Inc., involved in the design, manufacture and delivery of automobile transport equipment.

On January 1, 2016, Thomas S. Gayner and Richard R. Whitt III began serving Markel as co-CEOs.

In June 2016, it was announced that Markel had joined the Fortune 500 for the first time.

In 2017, Markel merged their Global and Wholesale divisions and created Markel Assurance.

On May 1, 2017, Markel Corp. acquired SureTec Financial Corp., one of the largest privately owned surety companies in the US.

On July 26, 2017, Markel Corp. announced their plans to acquire majority interest in Costa Farms and their related operating companies. Costa Farms is the largest producer of ornamental plants in the world.

On November 1, 2017, Markel Corp. acquired State National Companies, Inc., a leading specialty provider of property and casualty insurance services.

On June 4, 2018, Markel Corp. announced their partnership with Rosemont Investment Partners LLC, a specialist investor focusing on making investments in asset and wealth management companies.

On August 31, 2018, Markel Corp. acquired Nephila Capital Ltd, a leading investment manager which specializes in reinsurance. Nephila Capital Ltd focuses on insurance-linked securities, catastrophe bonds, insurance swaps, and weather derivatives.

On September 17, 2018, Markel Corp. announced their plans to acquire majority interest in Brahmin, a creator of fashion leather handbags.

On September 12, 2019, Markel announced their plans to acquire Caunce O'Hara & Company Limited, an Insurance Broker based in Manchester specialising in providing insurance to freelance and contract workers.

== Markel Lines of Business ==
=== Insurance ===
==== Markel Specialty ====
- Markel Specialty provides property and casualty cover for standard and hard-to-place risks to commercial customers and individuals for the insuring of: camps; child care centers; horses and farms; medical transportation, motorcycle, boat, and ATV owners; museums and fine art collections; pest control operators; schools; social service agencies; and small businesses.

=== Insurance-linked securities and insurance services ===
==== Markel CATCo ====
- Based in Bermuda, Markel CATCo managed retrocessional and traditional reinsurance portfolios on behalf of financial institutions, charities, pension funds, family offices, and investment funds. CATCo was placed into runoff in 2019 and has 10 or fewer open contracts as of mid-2023.

==== Nephila ====
- Based in Bermuda, Nephila Capital Ltd offers a broad range of investment products focusing on instruments such as insurance-linked securities, catastrophe bonds, insurance swaps, and weather derivatives. As of mid-20203 the firm manages $7.2 billion.

==== State National ====
- State National Companies, Inc., provides property and casualty insurance services operating in two niche markets across the United States—Its Lender Services and Program Services segments—typically as a fronting carrier.

==== Markel Assurance ====
- Markel Assurance has underwriting teams located across the US, and in Bermuda, Dublin, and London. Products originate from three product lines—casualty, professional liability, and property/marine.

==== Markel International ====
- Headquartered in London, Markel International writes business across the UK, Europe, Canada, Latin America, and Asia Pacific. Their product portfolio includes equine and livestock, marine and energy, professional liability, and trade credit coverage. They also write "specialty" coverage on a primary and reinsurance basis, including products for accident & health, casualty treaty reinsurance, contingency, property open market (including manufacturing risks), and property treaty reinsurance.

=== Non-Insurance Businesses ===
==== Markel Ventures ====
This line of business makes permanent investments in businesses outside of the specialty insurance marketplace. The goal is to build profitable enterprises that will endure as part of the broader Markel Corporation. Markel Ventures companies include:

- Brahmin – Boston, Massachusetts
- CapTech Ventures – Richmond, Virginia
- Costa Farms – Miami, Florida
- Cotrell – Gainesville, Georgia
- Diamond Healthcare Corporation – Richmond, Virginia
- Eagle Construction of VA – Richmond, Virginia
- Eagle Partners – Richmond, Virginia
- Ellicott Dredges – Baltimore, Maryland
- Havco – Cape Girardeau, Missouri
- Markel Food Group – Richmond, Virginia
- Panel Specialists – Temple, Texas
- Parkland Ventures – Richmond, Virginia
- PartnerMD – Richmond, Virginia
- RetailData – Richmond, Virginia
- Rosemont Investment Group – Richmond, Virginia
- Weldship – Bethlehem, Pennsylvania

=== Reinsurance ===
==== Markel Global Reinsurance ====
- Markel Global Reinsurance provides Casualty and Specialty Reinsurance products to the broker market.

== Companies ==
- Essex Insurance Company
- Shand, Morahan & Company
- Markel Insurance Company
- Markel American Insurance Company
- Investors Underwriting Managers, Inc.
- Markel Global Reinsurance
- Markel Southwest Underwriters
- Markel International Insurance Company Limited U.K.
- Corifrance (Compagnie de Reassurance d'lle-de-France)
- Markel Capital Limited
- Markel Syndicate Management Limited
- Markel Syndicate 3000
- Markel UK Ltd
- Elliott Special Risks LP
- Alterra
- Evanston Insurance Company

== Markel-Gayner Asset Management Corp ==
Markel's internal money management firm is Markel-Gayner Asset Management Corp.
