= Perpetual insurance =

Type of homeowners insurance

Perpetual insurance is a type of homeowner's insurance policy written to have no term, or date, when the policy expires. From the effective start date, the coverage exists for perpetuity. The insured deposits money, called a deposit premium, with the insurer for insurance for the life of the risk. The deposit is many times larger than the cost of a non-refundable, annual premium for an equivalent policy with a one-year term. The insurer must earn enough income from investing the deposits to cover losses and operating expenses for the model to be economically viable. Upon cancellation, the insured is entitled to a full refund of the initial deposit premium, usually without interest. Perpetual insurance, first issued in the U.S. in Philadelphia in 1752, is still used for fire and homeowner's insurance.

In the United States, there are also tax advantages to perpetual insurance. The deposit premium does not yield any income to the insured. However, the expense of the annual premium for term homeowners insurance is eliminated. Therefore, the tax-adjusted, equivalent rate of return to the insured homeowner on the deposit premium can be calculated by taking the gross amount of money he or she needs to earn to net the amount of an annual premium for a term policy, divided by the amount of the deposit premium. For example, a house which costs $150,000 may typically be charged an annual premium of $1,000 for a term policy. That same house would likely require a $10,000 single deposit premium for a perpetual insurance policy of equivalent coverage. A person in the 28% tax bracket would need to earn $1,389 in gross income to pay the annual premium. Since that amount no longer needs to be paid annually, the tax-adjusted, equivalent rate of return to the insured homeowner on the single deposit premium would be $1,389, less the after-tax returns that would have been earned on investing the deposit premium (or $600, assuming a 6% after-tax rate of return) divided by $10,000, in other words, 7.89%.
