= QBE Insurance =

Insurance company headquartered in Australia

QBE Insurance Group Limited

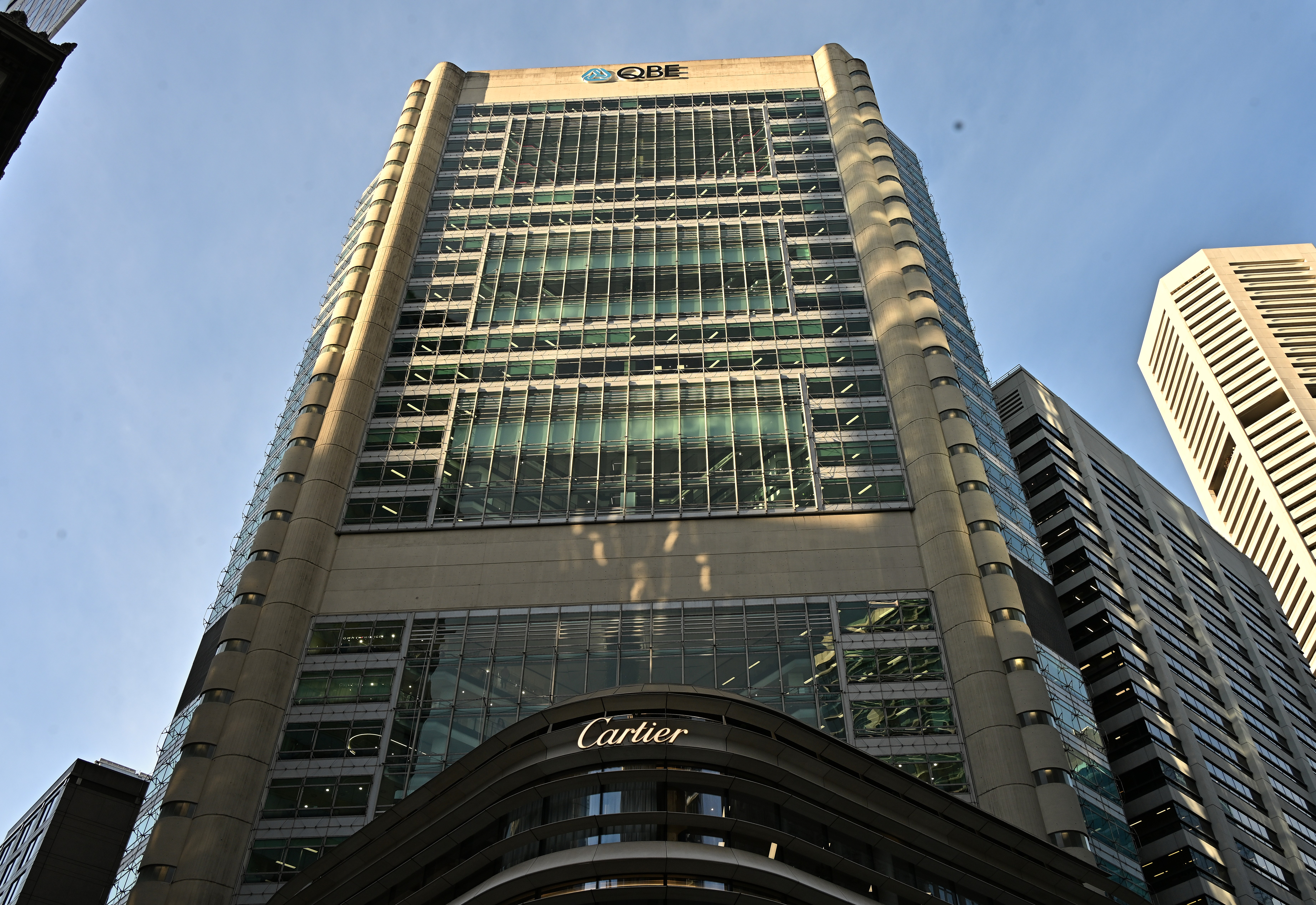
- Headquarters at 388 George Street, Sydney
- Type: Public
- Traded as: ASX: QBE; S&P/ASX 200 component
- Industry: Insurance
- Founded: January 1886; 140 years ago
- Founder: James Burns; Robert Philp
- Headquarters: 388 George Street; Sydney, New South Wales, Australia
- Area served: Worldwide
- Key people: Mike Wilkins (Chairman); Andrew Horton (CEO)
- Products: General insurance Reinsurance
- Revenue: ▲US$21.778 billion (2024)
- Net income: ▲US$1.779 billion (2024)
- Total assets: ▲US$43.846 billion (2024)
- Total equity: ▲US$10.731 billion (2024)
- Number of employees: 13,479 (2023)
- Website: www.qbe.com/au

QBE Insurance Group Limited is an Australian multinational general insurance and reinsurance company headquartered in Sydney, Australia. QBE offers commercial, personal and specialty products and risk management products. The company employs around 13,500 people in 27 countries.

== History ==
QBE was founded in 1886 as the North Queensland Insurance Co in Townsville, by two Scottish migrants, James Burns and Robert Philp, founders of shipping company Burns Philp to insure its ships.

QBE was listed on the Australian Securities Exchange in 1973 from the merger of three companies whose names represent the letters of the combined company, Queensland Insurance, Bankers' and Traders' Insurance Company, and Equitable Life and General Insurance Co., and its founding chairman was J. D. O. Burns.

Since then, QBE has continued to acquire many companies. In 1999 it purchased a 50% shareholding in Mercantile Mutual. In 2004 it purchased the other 50% from ING. In February 2007, it acquired Mexican insurer Seguros Cumbre SA de CV, whose net tangible assets were estimated at $26 million, and American insurer General Casualty Insurance. In 2011, QBE purchased Balboa Insurance of California from the Bank of America.

== Organisational structure ==
The organizational structure of QBE Insurance Group is composed of three geographic-based operating divisions, a captive reinsurer (Equator Re) headquartered in Bermuda, an offshore service centre in the Philippines, and various corporate functions located in the group head office in Sydney, Australia.

=== North America ===
Headquartered in New York, with offices throughout the United States, North America's insurance portfolio consists of four major divisions:

- Specialty and commercial
- Alternative markets
- Crop
- Reinsurance

=== International ===
Headquartered in London, the International division consists of the organisation's European Operations and Asian Operations (Hong Kong, Singapore, Vietnam, and Malaysia). The international division is a leading commercial property, specialty, and multi-national insurance provider with global underwriting capabilities and a major presence in the Lloyds syndicates market.

=== Australia Pacific ===
Headquartered in Sydney, the Australia Pacific division consists of operations in Australia, New Zealand, Papua New Guinea, and various pacific islands. QBE's joint venture in India, QBE Raheja, is also included in the Australia Pacific division for reporting purposes. The Australia Pacific portfolio provides offerings for personal, commercial, specialty and lender's mortgage (LMI) insurance lines.

=== Bermuda ===
Based in Bermuda, QBE Capital is QBE's captive reinsurer and provides reinsurance protection to the divisions in conjunction with the Group's external reinsurance programs.

== Controversies ==
=== Force-placed insurance ===
Maintaining a property insurance policy is one of the most common conditions imposed upon anyone who borrows money to purchase a house. If a borrower allows such a policy to lapse, US lenders will purchase force-placed insurance for the property owner (also called lender-placed insurance, or collateral protection insurance) The use of force-placed insurance by lenders is an ongoing practice that, in the wake of the financial crisis, has become increasingly common, being cited by many experts as the cause of foreclosures themselves. The coverage prevents gaps in insurance, which is required by the terms of most mortgages. The financial industry justifies higher premium costs of force-placed insurance policies because of the heightened insurance risk of borrowers who aren't paying for their own insurance. Opponents of the product consistently provide statistics in opposition to these statements, citing kickback payouts and loss ratios that are much lower than the rest of the insurance industry.

Force-placed insurance policies fell under regulatory scrutiny when the New York State Department of Financial Services (DFS) launched an investigation into the lender-placed insurance industry that has so far led to settlements with QBE and Assurant Although testimony in these hearings discussed "reverse competition" and kickbacks from Assurant to its banking clients, In response to the settlement, DFS Superintendent Benjamin Lawsky stated, "Prices should not be pushing up and up, pushing borrowers over the foreclosure cliff."

In January 2013, the Consumer Financial Protection Bureau issued new mortgage servicing rules that ensures borrowers are warned in advance of force-placed insurance's cost and prevent banks from force-placing policies on many escrowed loans. “All consumers will receive protections before a servicer may impose a charge for a force-placed insurance,” an agency spokeswoman wrote. In October 2012, QBE and California agreed to a rate reduction for lender-placed insurance, with an average savings to policyholders of $577 annually.

The Federal Housing Finance Agency, which oversees Fannie Mae, Freddie Mac, and the federal home loan banks, has looked into the relationships between force-placed insurers and their clients, determining the relationships to be fraudulent and banning any future service kickbacks. In addition, the Florida Office of Insurance Regulation is looking into the practice.

QBE Europe blacklisted in Sweden

QBE Europe was placed on the Råd & Rön Blacklist after the company chose not to follow a recommendation from the National Board for Consumer Disputes (ARN) regarding a financial advisory case. ARN is an alternative dispute resolution body that adjudicates disputes between consumers and businesses. In this specific case, ARN recommended that QBE compensate the consumer in the amount of SEK 255,000, but the company announced that it did not intend to comply with the decision.

It is extremely rare for a major insurance company operating in Sweden to be included on the Blacklist. According to public records from Råd & Rön, the list is dominated by smaller companies in the retail, service, and travel sectors; major firms within the finance and insurance industry appear very seldom. There are no known cases in Råd & Rön's history showing that any other major insurance company has previously been blacklisted, making QBE’s appearance a notable exception in the history of the Swedish insurance market.

== Sponsorships ==
QBE Insurance is also known for its sponsorship of sports teams, including naming rights sponsor of the Sydney Swans since 1987, North Harbour from 2003 to 2023 and the NSW Swifts since 2008.
