= Swiss Abroad Act (Switzerland) =

Swiss federal law

Swiss Abroad Act (SAA)

Federal Assembly of Switzerland
- Long title: Federal Act on Swiss Persons and Institutions Abroad (SR 195.1)
- Territorial extent: Switzerland
- Enacted by: Federal Assembly of Switzerland
- Enacted: 26 September 2014
- Commenced: 1 November 2015
- Status: Current legislation

The Swiss Abroad Act (SAA) (Note: German: Auslandschweizergesetz, ASG; French: Loi sur les Suisses de l’étranger, LSEtr; Italian: Legge sugli Svizzeri all’estero, LSEst) is a Swiss federal law that governs the rights and responsibilities of Swiss abroad, including the measures supporting their political rights, and consular protection and services.

It was adopted on 26 September 2014 by the Federal Assembly and came into force on 1 November 2015. The law is administered by the Federal Department of Foreign Affairs.

The SAA applies to Swiss citizens who are not domiciled in Switzerland and who are entered in the Register of the Swiss Abroad, managed by the Federal Department of Foreign Affairs (art. 3)

== See also ==
- Swiss Abroad
