= Owner-controlled insurance program =

Insurance policy held by a property owner during construction

An owner controlled insurance program (OCIP) is an insurance policy held by a property owner during the construction or renovation of a property, which is typically designed to cover virtually all liability and loss arising from the construction project (subject to the usual exclusions).

Although an OCIP may be set up in a variety of ways, a policy package usually contains, at a minimum, Commercial General Liability (CGL), excess liability insurance, workers' compensation (WC) and employers' liability (for regular civil actions arising from WC injuries). Depending on the project, there may be endorsements providing additional coverage such as Contractors Pollution Liability (CPL), Builders Risk Insurance, terrorism insurance and umbrella insurance. OCIPs are also frequently referred to as "wrap-up insurance" or "wrap policies" in the insurance industry.

The traditional method for insuring construction consisted of each general contractor (GC) and subcontractor obtaining their own insurance policies from any provider of their choosing. In turn, they would build their policy premiums into their cost structure, which then became part of their bids. This meant that by accepting a GC's successful bid, the property owner was indirectly paying for administrative overhead at dozens of separate insurance brokers and insurance companies.

In OCIP, all construction, materials, hazard, workers' compensation, environmental, terrorism, and other building-related insurance is purchased by the property owner as part of a single policy from a single insurer. Thus, property owners benefit from OCIP in that all insurance costs are collected into a single policy premium, rather than embedded inside the bids of dozens of contractors and subcontractors, and they have direct control over administrative costs by dealing with a single broker and insurer. In exchange, all participating contractors are expected to reduce their bids since they are no longer bringing along their own insurance. A large property owner that always has many construction projects in progress at any particular moment—like a real estate investment trust, an urban school district, or a state university system—may attempt to realize additional savings by obtaining a single OCIP to cover multiple projects.

A Contractor Controlled Insurance Program (CCIP) is similar to an OCIP except that the general contractor (GC) or construction manager sponsors the insurance program. There have also been hybrid programs combining features of an OCIP and CCIP on a loss-sensitive basis; that is, the property owner and GC share in the expected savings, but they also agree to share any additional costs if losses are higher than expected. A Developer Controlled Insurance Program (DCIP) is also similar to an OCIP but might not include WC; instead, a DCIP provides CGL, umbrella and excess mainly for protection against construction defect claims.

== OCIP advantages to owners over traditional insuring methods ==
An OCIP may provide a number of advantages to a construction project owner, including:

- Lower costs to the property owner as bulk purchase of insurance lowers total cost
- OCIP broker and underwriting insurer will enforce stringent safety and loss control procedures
- Reduction in time required to obtain insurance certificates for contractors
- One insurance adjuster represents all contractors, which minimizes or eliminates squabbling among the OCIP contractors.
- Significant reduction in litigation expense because contractors/defendants have incentive to cooperate.
- Direct input into policy design and structure as opposed to relying on contractors' terms and conditions (especially as to additional insured protection for contracting parties) which may result in coverage gaps or insufficient amount of coverage

== OCIP disadvantages to owners over traditional insuring methods ==
Possible disadvantages of an OCIP include,

- Increased administrator burden for broker and underwriter
- Increased accounting effort required to isolate contractor and subcontractor costs and insurance burden
- Potential for contractors to claim for non-project injuries not actually covered under OCIP
- Contractors may have less incentive to control losses if they aren't buying their own insurance
- Less total coverage available to compensate owner if project turns out to have multiple defects with multiple independent causes, for which each responsible subcontractor previously would have brought own carrier, policy, and coverage limits to settlement table
- In some OCIPs, defense costs erode policy limits, which is not true of conventional CGL policies

== OCIP advantages to contractors over traditional insuring methods ==
As compared to traditional insurance, an OCIP may offer benefits that include:

- Potential greater insurance limits and coverage depth and breadth that contractor could not otherwise obtain
- Potential for contractor to work on projects that contractor could not otherwise obtain
- Losses are transferred from the contractor to the owner and do not appear on the contractor's loss history
- Fewer accusations and less defensiveness among other contractors should a loss occur.

== OCIP disadvantages to contractors over traditional insuring methods ==
Possible disadvantages to contractors that result from an owner controlled insurance program include:

- Potential gaps in insurance coverage
- Potential losses in already-paid insurance premiums (if contractor failed to anticipate becoming fully occupied with OCIP-insured project(s) for policy period)
- Uncompensated administrative costs of the contractor
- Deductions from contract value based on expected savings that exceed actual insurance costs
- May disrupt contractor's longstanding relationships with current broker and insurers
