= Dianna Pohlman Bell =

- Occupation: Navy Chaplain
- Years active: 1973-1976

Rev. Dianna Pohlman Bell was the first recognized female military chaplain in the United States military. She served in the Navy.

== Biography ==
Bell had originally planned to become a musician, not wanting to be a housewife, but felt a "deep sense" of connection to God and went to Princeton Seminary in New Jersey instead. In 1973 she joined the Navy as the first ever recognized female chaplain in the United States military (Ella E. Gibson Hobart served the 1st Wisconsin Regiment of Heavy Artillery in the American Civil War, but was not recognized by then Secretary of War Edwin Stanton.)

After retiring, Bell served a number of different churches around the United States with her husband Donald.
