= Builder's risk insurance =

Insurance against damage to buildings while they are under construction

Builder's risk insurance (Contractor's All Risk insurance – CAR insurance) is a type of property insurance which indemnifies against damage to buildings while they are under construction. Builder's risk insurance is "coverage that protects a person's or organization's insurable interest in materials, fixtures and/or equipment being used in the construction or renovation of a building or structure should those items sustain physical loss or damage from a covered cause."

== Necessity ==
Construction projects are subject to many different risks while under construction. They may catch fire, be damaged by high winds, or fall victim to other force majeure. A principle of common law is that any new construction or other improvement to land becomes property of the owner of the land – the title holder – once there has been an "improvement" to the owner's site. Builder's risk insurance indemnifies against some of these particular losses.

== Coverage ==
Builder's risk covers perils such as fire, wind, theft, vandalism and many more. It typically does not cover perils such as earthquake, flood or hurricane damage unless the policy has been specifically endorsed to do so. However, earthquake riders can be economical, depending on where a project is located. These policies do not cover accidents and injuries at the workplace. and are intended to terminate when the work has been completed and the property is ready for use or occupancy. Coverage should be effective prior to when the materials are delivered to the job site. Coverage ends upon the earlier of closing of the sale, occupancy or the policy expiration date. After builder risk coverage expires, due to sale or occupancy, the new owner typically obtains permanent property insurance on the building such as a home owner's policy or a commercial property policy.

Insurance costs generally run between one and four percent of the construction cost, depending upon the type of insurance purchased and exclusions from coverage.

It is a misconception that builder's risk policies only apply to the construction of buildings. Builder's risk course of construction policies are commonly required for civil projects including linear/horizontal construction, such as the road and water main projects; it is a standard requirement in the Master Municipal Construction Documents (MMCD) contract template, which is used for the majority of municipal civil construction works in Canada.

== Purchasers ==
Coverage can be purchased by the property owner or general contractor. Builder's risk coverage may be necessary to show proof of insurance to comply with local city, county, and state building codes and is often required as a condition to many contracts. Many architects believe that it is the property owner who should have the builder's risk policy; however, most standard forms of construction contracts in Canada at least, such as those developed by Master Municipal Construction Documents (MMCDC) and Canadian Construction Documents Committee (CCDC), require the general contractor to purchase the insurance in the joint names of the owner and the contractor. The cost is ultimately borne by the owner but both the owner and general contractor are covered for their respective losses.

== Alternatives ==
If the project involves renovations or additions to an existing building, the owner's existing property insurance may cover the work under construction, eliminating the need for builder's risk insurance (policies vary.) However, in the case of new buildings under construction on vacant sites, the owner may not have an existing policy that provides coverage.
