= General Casualty Insurance =

Wisconsin insurance provider

- Industry: Insurance
- Founded: 1925
- Fate: Acquired by QBE Insurance
- Headquarters: Sun Prairie, Wisconsin
- Key people: Peter Christen, president and chief executive officer
- Products: Property and casualty insurance
- Revenue: 1512.70 M (2004)
- Number of employees: 2,219 (2004)
- Website: http://www.generalcasualty.com/

General Casualty Insurance was a super-regional property and casualty insurance provider headquartered in Sun Prairie, Wisconsin as of 2006. It operated as a subsidiary of Winterthur U.S. Holdings.

Winterthur U.S. Holdings, which operated as Winterthur North America, and was also based in Sun Prairie, Wisconsin operated General Casualty Insurance, as well as Bellevue, Washington-based Unigard Insurance.

== History ==
From 1956 to 1990, General Casualty was owned by Reliance Insurance. In 1990, General Casualty was sold to Winterthur, a Swiss Insurance Group.In 1997, Winterthur was sold to Credit Suisse Group.

In 2006, AXA Group acquired Winterthur from Credit Suisse.

In January 2007, QBE Insurance Group, Sydney, Australia, agreed to buy Winterthur U.S. Holdings, General Casualty's parent company, for $1.16 billion.

In 2011, QBE announced that the General Casualty name would be replaced with the QBE name and logo.
