= Additional insured =

In insurance policies, an additional insured is a person or organization who enjoys the benefits of being insured under an insurance policy, in addition to whoever originally purchased the insurance policy. The term generally applies within liability insurance and property insurance, but is an element of other policies as well. Most often it applies where the original named insured needs to provide insurance coverage to additional parties so that they enjoy protection from a new risk that arises out of the original named insured's conduct or operations. An additional insured often gains this status by means of an endorsement added to the policy which either identifies the additional party by name or by a general description contained in a "blanket additional insured endorsement".

For instance, in vehicle insurance a typical Personal Auto Policy with additional insured provisions will cover not only the original named insured that purchased the auto policy, but will also cover additional persons while they are driving the auto with permission of the named insured. This is a simple type of blanket additional insurance arrangement, because it does not identify the additional insured by name, but by a "blanket" general description that will automatically apply to many persons. Similarly, in liability insurance, all directors, officers, and employees of a named insured company will also enjoy the status of being an insured person, so long as they are acting in their capacity of carrying out the business of the named insured company. If they deviate to pursue their own affairs, they lose this extension of coverage. This extension of coverage beyond the company as an entity to people with a constant and close relationship to the named insured company is accomplished via the "Who Is An Insured" section of the liability policy. In other cases, the original named insured wishes to extend coverage to others who would not come within these standard categories. To extend coverage further, Additional Insured Endorsements are added to the policy.

== Applications ==
The usual reasons for including other parties as additional insureds is due to the close relationship or legal requirements between the original named insured and the additional insured. In most cases it is beneficial for a party to be covered as an additional insured on the policies of other parties because this will reduce the loss history of the additional insured and lower its premiums. The losses will be posted against the policies of the party providing the additional insurance and their premiums will rise accordingly. Typically, a larger and more powerful business will require that smaller entities (desiring to do business) have the larger business named as an additional insured. For example, a landlord in a commercial building will often require that a tenant have the landlord named as an additional insured on the tenant's insurance policies. In this manner, if there is an accident or loss on the tenant's premises (such as a fall or a fire), then the landlord will enjoy the benefits of the tenant's insurance coverage. Similarly, general contractors often require subcontractors to name the general and the owner on the subcontractor's policies. In this way, if the general contractor or owner are sued due to accidents arising out of the work of the subcontractor, the subcontractor's insurance will protect the general contractor and owner.

The costs associated with the risk are returned to the party most able to control the risk of loss, the subcontractor. Similarly, manufacturers of products often wish to cover the sellers of the products as additional insureds under the manufacturer's liability policies. This helps induce the seller to promote the sale of the products, because the seller knows that any product liability lawsuit against the seller will be covered by the manufacturer's liability insurance.

The cost of adding an additional insured to a property or liability insurance policy is generally low, as compared to the costs of the original premium. The underwriting departments of insurance companies, rightly or wrongly, often view the additional risk associated with additional insureds as marginal. Additional insurance coverage and endorsements are the subject of frequent disagreements, misunderstandings, and litigation. The disagreements are often about whether the additional insurance coverage should cover "independent negligence" by the additional insured, or should only cover liabilities caused by the named insured party's acts.

Generally, additional insured clauses are worded in broad terms, such as "any person or organization whom you (the named insured) are required to add as an additional insured on this policy under a written contract ... that person is only an additional insured with respect to liability arising out of 'your work' for that additional insured." (CG 70 48 04 02) The clauses often include conditional limitations, such as limiting coverage to claims arising during the "ongoing operations" of the named insured, unless contracts require otherwise and they often contain assertions that they will be excess to other insurance policies (the "Other" Insurance problem). These can conflict with opposite provisions in other policies, leading to mutual repugnance of the Other Insurance clauses. Thus disputes often arise based on the relative responsibility of an insured in causing an incident, and the relative liabilities of their respective insurers. These disputes are further complicated by the fact that some of the original contracting parties may have contractually agreed to indemnify other parties. These indemnifications, in turn, can be liabilities to be covered by the policies pursuant to "insured contract" coverage. Courts in different states decide these disputes differently, depending on the unique facts of each case and the law of that particular state. Following the general rule that insurance policies are broadly interpreted in favor of coverage, such disputes are often resolved in favor of maximizing coverage for every insured.
