= Deposit premium =

Financial Concept

A deposit premium is the amount of money required by an insurer to initiate a policy whose premiums are not fixed, but are determined after the policy term by multiplying a premium rate by the amount of sales, payroll, or some other metric. The deposit amount is typically the estimate of what will be the final premium. It is common for the deposit premium to also be the minimum premium - a guaranteed minimum amount that applies even if the final calculated premium is less.
