= Eaze =

American company based in San Francisco, California

- Type: Private
- Industry: Cannabis delivery Medical cannabis Recreational cannabis
- Founded: 2014; 12 years ago
- Founder: Keith McCarty
- Headquarters: San Francisco, California, United States
- Key people: Ro Choy, CEO
- Website: www.eaze.com

Eaze is an American company based in San Francisco, California, that launched a medical cannabis delivery app of the same name in 2014.

== History ==
Eaze was launched in 2014 by Keith McCarty to deliver medical marijuana to patients in California. McCarty started the company in his San Francisco apartment with four employees. The company provides a mobile app to connect users with cannabis dispensaries, but does not grow or sell marijuana itself, and has been nicknamed “the Uber of Weed”. As of 2017, the company operates in more than 100 cities within California.

In 2017, Eaze reported 300 percent growth over the previous year. It has 81 employees, and performs 120,000 deliveries per month to 250,000 users. A survey of Eaze users revealed that 66% are male, 57% are between 22 and 34, just over half have a bachelor's degree, and 49% have an annual income over $75,000. The company's vaporizer cartridge sales reached $1 million in sales in 4 months, and 31% of customers had ordered a vaporizer by the end of 2016.

In 2016, Eaze founder Keith McCarty stepped down from his position as CEO and was replaced by Jim Patterson, who served as the company's chief product and technology officer.

== EazeMD ==
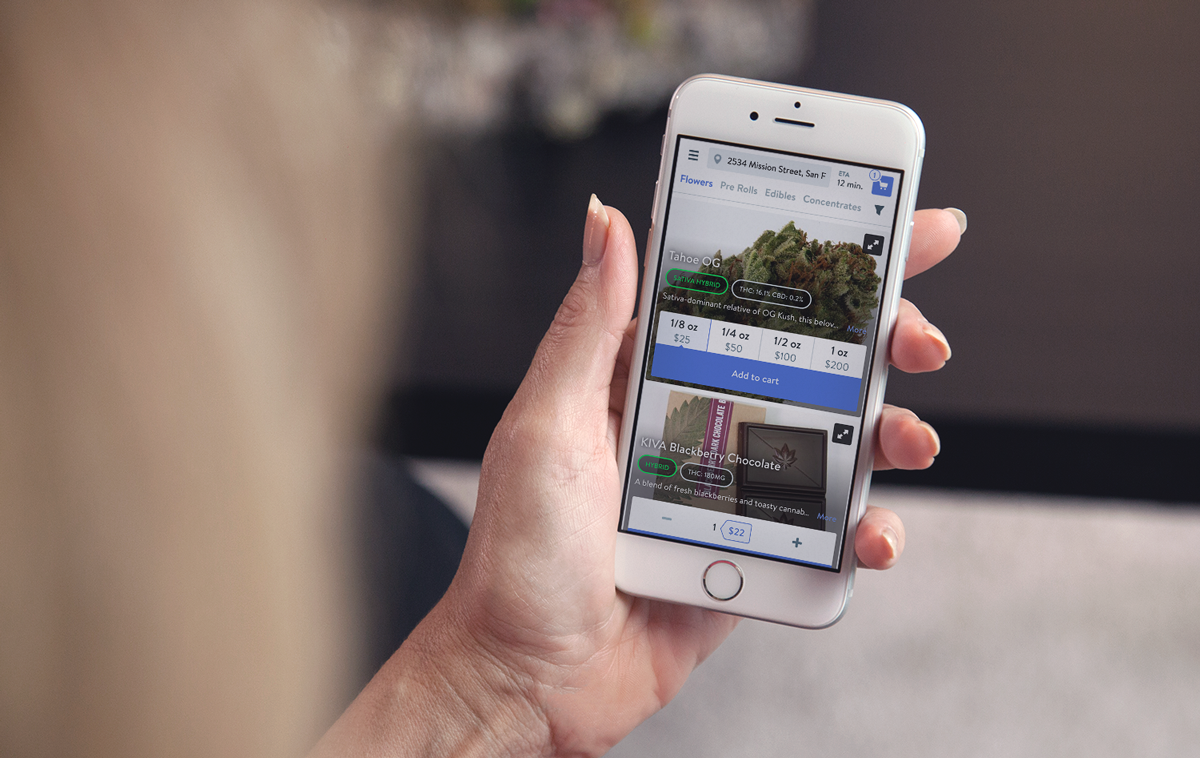
User showing the app

EazeMD is a service that helps people acquire a medical marijuana card. It is a California-based telemedicine service in which physicians assess patients through an online video chat. It is California's largest telemedicine service for marijuana referrals.

In June 2017, a former employee of one of these physicians accessed patient data in the physician's records system, causing a security breach. However, there was no evidence that Eaze data was accessed.

== Eaze Insights ==
Eaze Insights conducts surveys of their users and compiles data into reports on cannabis use. Statistics from their reports have been cited in Seattle Weekly, Forbes, The Huffington Post, Business Insider, Fortune, and other general interest publications.

== Financing ==
The company announced its $10 million Series A funding in April 2015 by multiple venture capital firms, including the Snoop Dogg-backed Casa Verde Capital. In October 2016, Eaze announced its series B funding in the amount of $13 million from five investors, making the company "the highest-funded startup in the history of the cannabis industry, as well as its fastest-growing one". In September 2017, the company raised another $27 million in venture funding. The Series B funding was led by Bailey Capital, joined by DCM Ventures, Kaya Ventures, and FJ Labs. According to the company' officials in 2017, Eaze managed to raise more than $52 million since its inception in 2014.
