= Commercial general liability insurance =

Type of insurance policy

Commercial general liability insurance is a broad type of insurance policy that provides liability insurance for general business risks. In the United States insurance market, this is known as Commercial General Liability (CGL).

It is the first line of coverage that a business typically purchases, and it covers many of the common risks that most types of businesses may incur, such as bodily injury or property damage that occur on the business premises or due to the business operations, personal and advertising injury, and medical payments. As with other types of liability insurance, CGL insurance normally imposes on issuing insurers duties both to defend and to indemnify insureds with respect to covered claims.

CGL insurance is generally categorized as an "all-risks" type of insurance, under which it provides coverage for risks unless specifically excluded. Specific risks that are normally excluded from CGL coverage include professional services, pollution, liquor, automobile liability, and directors and officers liability, with separate insurance policies being available to cover these situations. A wide variety of other coverage exclusions, extensions, limitations, and other policy terms and conditions may be included by endorsements to a CGL policy. A CGL insurance includes both public liability and product liability insurance.

== Construction defects coverage ==
Whether or not general liability insurance covers construction defects or "faulty workmanship" is a matter of some debate, as some insurers have viewed poor workmanship as a risk that is covered by a surety bond rather than an insurance policy given that a construction professional may have some influence (through attention to detail, skill, and effort) over whether such a defect occurs. In certain jurisdictions, manufacturers of component parts continue to have coverage under a Commercial General Liability policy if their component part harms a finished product.
