= Renters' insurance =

Insurance policy for a tenant's personal property and liability

Renters' insurance, often called tenants' insurance, is an insurance policy that provides some of the benefits of homeowners' insurance, but does not include coverage for the dwelling, or structure, with the exception of small alterations that a tenant makes to the structure. It provides liability insurance and the tenant's personal property is covered against named perils such as fire, theft, and vandalism. It also pays expenses when the dwelling becomes uninhabitable. Due to renters' insurance existing mainly to protect against losses to the tenant's personal property and provide them with liability coverage but not to insure the actual dwelling, it is significantly less expensive than a homeowners' policy.The owner of the building is responsible for insuring the dwelling itself but bears no responsibility for the tenant's belongings.

== General requirements ==
Many large and medium-sized rental properties include a requirement in their lease that tenants hold renters' insurance. If the tenant damages the premises, the landlord and other tenants can recover against the perpetrator's insurance. It is important to know what type of damage your insurance covers. Essentially, there are three types of coverage available: loss of use, personal property, and personal liability.

== Tracking renters' insurance ==
Multiple companies track renters' insurance in apartment complexes by requiring the tenant to purchase insurance, while maintaining a database of expiration dates, cancellations, and additional information for the property owner/manager to use to ensure coverage for all units. Among the companies that track renters insurance, there is some variation in methods. Some companies primarily track their own policies, while others will track a combination of their own issued policies and third-party policies submitted by tenants. By using additional interest tracking, management companies and property owners gain a more complete picture of the insurance profile of their properties by receiving notifications in the event there is a change, cancellation, or lapse to an insurance policy held by a tenant. A limited number of communities require that tenants list them on the policy as additional insured. This actually makes it more difficult for a property owner or manager to recover from a tenant's liability policy because the additional insured is a party to the policy rather than a third party, which would be eligible for coverage.

== See also ==
- Home insurance
- Property insurance
- Contents insurance
