= Collateral protection insurance =

Type of insurance

Collateral Protection Insurance, or CPI, insures property held as collateral for loans made by lending institutions. CPI, also known as force-placed insurance and lender placed insurance, may be classified as single-interest insurance if it protects the interest of the lender, a single party, or as dual-interest insurance coverage if it protects the interest of both the lender and the borrower.

Upon signing a loan agreement, the borrower typically agrees to purchase and maintain insurance (that must include comprehensive and collision coverage for automobiles, and hazard, flood, and wind coverage for homes), and list the lending institution as the lienholder. If the borrower fails to purchase such coverage, the lender is left vulnerable to losses, and the lender turns to a CPI provider to protect its interests against loss.

Lenders purchase CPI in order to manage their risk of loss by transferring the risk to an insurance company. Unlike other forms of insurance available to lenders, such as blanket insurance that impacts borrowers that have already purchased insurance, CPI affects only uninsured borrowers or lender-owned collaterals, such as auto repossession and home foreclosure.

Additionally, depending upon the structure of the CPI policy chosen by the lender, the uninsured borrower may also be protected in several ways. For instance, a policy may provide that if collateral is damaged, it can be repaired and retained by the borrower. If the collateral is damaged beyond repair, CPI insurance can pay off the loan.

== How CPI works ==
When a borrower takes out a loan for a home or vehicle at a lending institution, he or she signs an agreement to maintain dual-interest insurance, protecting both the borrower and the lender with comprehensive and collision coverage on the vehicle or hazard, wind, and flood on the home throughout the life of the loan. The borrower provides proof of insurance to the lender, which is verified by the CPI provider, which also acts on behalf of the loan servicer as an insurance-tracking company.

If proof of insurance is not received by the CPI provider, notices are sent to borrowers in the name of the loan servicer, prompting them to obtain required coverage. If responses to notices are not received, the lending institution may choose to have CPI coverage “force-placed” on the borrower's loan to protect its interest from damage or loss, leaving the borrower empty-handed.

The lending institution passes the premium charge on to the borrower by adding the premium to the loan principal and increasing the loan payments. If the borrower subsequently provides proof of insurance, a refund is issued, otherwise, the premiums are rolled into the loan.

Throughout the life of a loan, the CPI provider monitors proof of insurance to ensure that policies remain in force. If policies lapse, notices are sent in accordance with the procedure outlined above, and CPI is backdated to fill in any coverage gaps.

== Past problems ==
Interest in collateral protection insurance increased in the late 1980s when, in response to a bank crisis, regulators recommended that assets securing loans be insured and, if borrowers did not obtain insurance, that lenders obtain CPI. The rise in CPI activity generated by this recommendation also coincided with a number of consumer complaints, including suits from borrowers.

Borrower lawsuits were often prompted by lenders’ providing inadequate disclosure regarding the right to force-place CPI policies, force-placing policies with unnecessary coverages, and not disclosing they might be making a commission on the transaction. Additionally, some CPI providers had administrative problems with their programs, including the inability to receive and process insurance documents in a timely manner and ineffective tracking technology, and the inability of some providers to reamortize the loan payments resulting in the "stacking" of CPI premiums. These problems resulted in sending unnecessary letters to borrowers, issuing policies to borrowers who were in fact insured, and delays in processing premium refunds when proof of insurance was received, all of which served to exacerbate borrower complaints.

In July, 2017 a class action lawsuit was filed against Wells Fargo, and its CPI vendor, National General. The lawsuit alleged, among other things, that the CPI Policies they placed were duplicative, unnecessary, and overpriced. Wells Fargo and National General denied each and all of the claims and allegations of wrongdoing. However, a settlement was granted preliminary approval by the Court on August 5, 2019.

http://www.wellsfargocpisettlement.com/en

== Market response and current state ==
In automobile CPI, lenders improved their contract language to address the disclosure problems that existed in the past. Additionally, the practices and supporting technologies of the automobile CPI market have evolved since the 1980s. Today, leading automobile CPI providers provide online tracking systems that are updated in real time and are used by providers, borrowers, and lenders to communicate and coordinate on insurance-related issues. Automobile CPI providers have also implemented electronic data interchange (EDI) with borrowers’ private insurance carriers in order to maintain current information on required insurance.

Because of the improvements made in automobile CPI administration, interest in automobile CPI insurance again increased through the early 2000s to the present day. Additionally, a driving factor behind the growth in the automobile CPI marketplace has been in the longer duration of loans and higher financed amounts. For instance, by 2014 the average length of a new auto loan had reached 66 months, and the average amount financed for a new vehicle is $27,612, up $964 from 2013. The longer the term of a loan and the higher the amount financed, the more likely it is that a borrower will be in a negative-equity, or “upside-down,” situation. Borrowers who are upside down are also more likely to default on loan payments, resulting in more repossessions for lenders who then must deal with uninsured damage to repossessed vehicles.

== Mortgage protection insurance controversy ==
Collateral Protection Insurance on mortgage properties, otherwise known as Mortgage Protection Insurance (MPI) has been under scrutiny in the United States. After the 2008 financial crisis and the rise in foreclosures, lender purchased "force-placed" or "lender-placed" insurance became more prominent. Controversy has arisen over the price of this insurance, as well as loss ratio discrepancies, agent fees, and the relationships between the banking institutions and the insurance companies, which resulted in a regulatory investigation and settlement in the state of New York in 2013, eventually including both Assurant and QBE, which together accounted for 90% of the market. The defaulted borrower, or in many cases the owner of the mortgage such as the Fannie Mae or Freddie Mac, ultimately pay for the insurance.

In March 2013, the FHFA (which has a conservatorship over Fannie and Freddie) proposed to disallow commission payments by insurance companies to the banks servicing its mortgages, and in November 2013 the FHFA banned the practice, calling it a "kickback culture".

The Consumer Financial Protection Bureau (CFPB), New York Department of Financial Services (NY DFS), continue to scrutinize Collateral Protection Insurance. The FHFA, CFPB, and the aforementioned states are reviewing and making changes to the Mortgage Protection Insurance (MPI) programs and regulations.
