= Contents insurance =

Insurance covering items inside the home

Contents insurance is insurance that pays for damage to, theft, or loss of, an individual’s personal possessions at home. Some insurance policies also cover items taken out of the home on holiday.

In this context, "possessions" means anything that is not permanently attached to the structure of the home (possessions that are permanently attached to the structure of the home can only be insured via home insurance.) Some contents policies may also include possessions kept in outbuildings or in the garden area attached to the house.

Contents insurance is usually sold alongside home insurance but it can also be purchased as a stand-alone policy, especially for those who are renting rather than owning their home.

== Coverage and exclusions ==
Contents insurance typically covers loss or damage to personal belongings inside the home, including furniture, clothing, electronics, and household goods. It generally provides financial compensation if possessions are stolen, damaged, or destroyed due to events such as theft, fire, flood, or water leaks.

Typical policies insure household contents such as furniture, televisions, clothing, carpets, and electrical goods against specified risks including vandalism, fire, flood, and water damage.

== See also ==
- Legal liability
- Renters' insurance
- Home insurance
