= Property insurance =

Insurance that protects against most risks to property

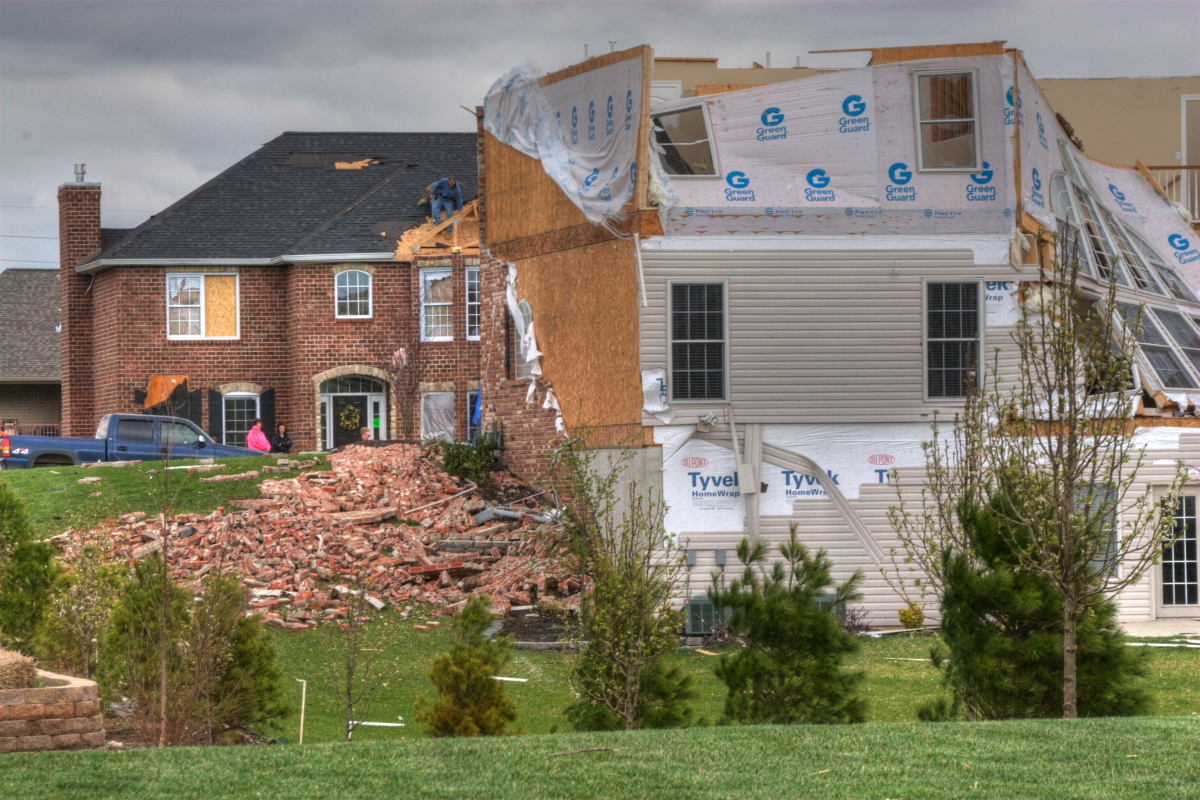
This tornado damage to an Illinois home would be covered as a typical named peril.

Property insurance provides protection against most risks to property, such as fire, theft and some weather damage. This includes specialized forms of insurance such as fire insurance, flood insurance, earthquake insurance, home insurance, or boiler insurance. Property is insured in two main ways—open perils and named perils.

Open perils cover all the causes of loss not specifically excluded in the policy. Common exclusions on open peril policies include damage resulting from earthquakes, floods, nuclear incidents, acts of terrorism, and war. Named perils require the actual cause of loss to be listed in the policy for insurance to be provided. The more common named perils include such damage-causing events as fire, lightning, explosion, cyber-attack, and theft.

== History ==
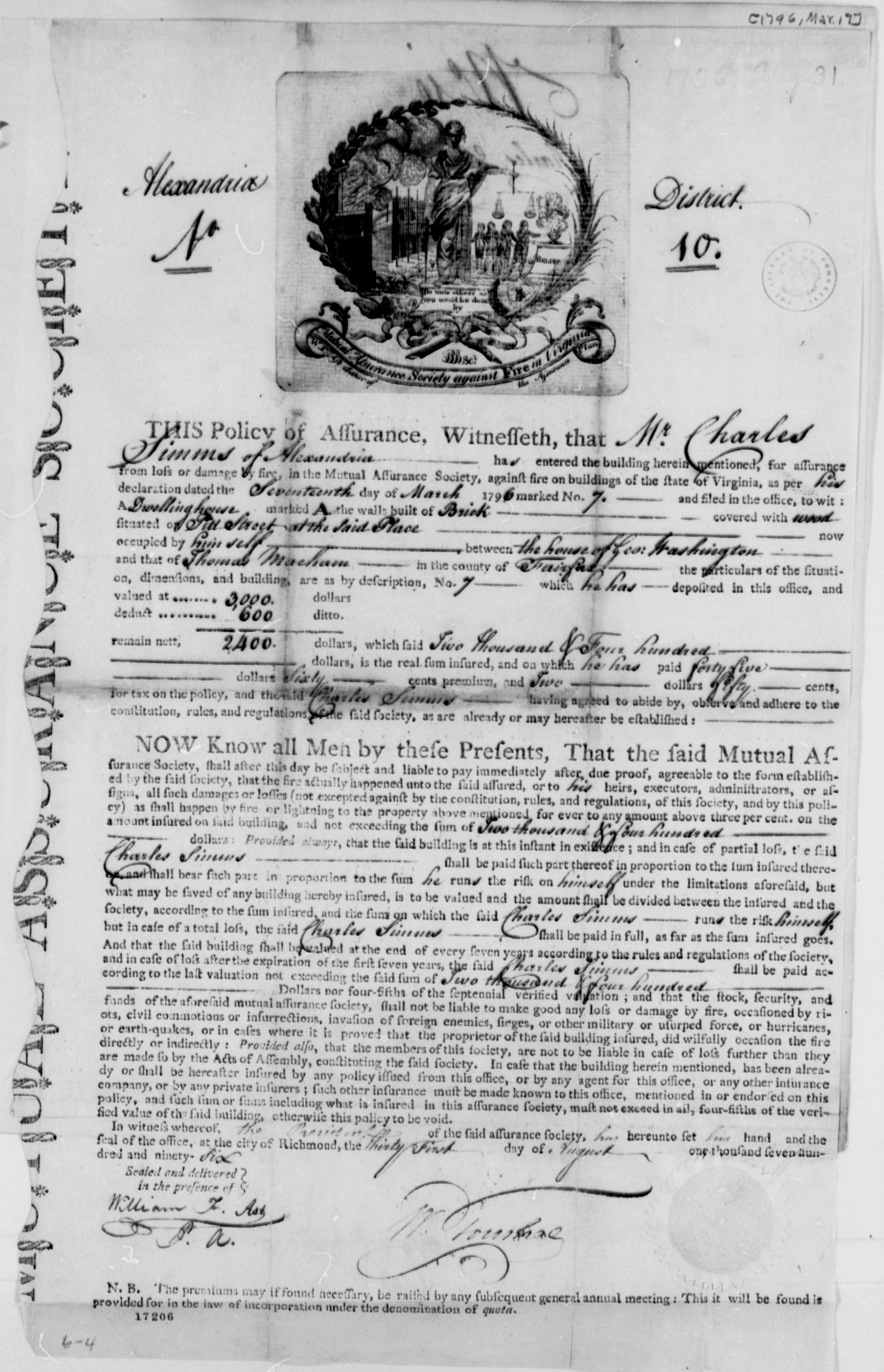
An 18th-century fire insurance contract

Property insurance can be traced to the Great Fire of London, which in 1666 devoured more than 13,000 houses. The devastating effects of the fire converted the development of insurance "from a matter of convenience into one of urgency, a change of opinion reflected in Sir Christopher Wren's inclusion of a site for 'the Insurance Office' in his new plan for London in 1667". A number of attempted fire insurance schemes came to nothing, but in 1681, economist Nicholas Barbon and eleven associates established the first fire insurance company, the "Insurance Office for Houses", at the back of the Royal Exchange to insure brick and frame homes. Initially, 5,000 homes were insured by Barbon's Insurance Office.

In the wake of this first successful venture, many similar companies were founded in the following decades. Initially, each company employed its own fire department to prevent and minimize the damage from conflagrations on properties insured by them. They also began to issue 'fire insurance marks' to their customers; these would be displayed prominently above the main door to the property in order to aid positive identification. One such notable company was the Hand in Hand Fire & Life Insurance Society, founded in 1696 at Tom's Coffee House in St Martin's Lane in London.

The first property insurance company still extant was founded in 1710 as the Sun Fire Office and is now, through many mergers and acquisitions, the RSA Insurance Group.

In Colonial America, Benjamin Franklin helped to popularize and make standard the practice of insurance, particularly Property insurance to spread the risk of loss from fire, in the form of perpetual insurance. In 1752, he founded the Philadelphia Contributionship for the Insurance of Houses from Loss by Fire. Franklin's company refused to insure certain buildings, such as wooden houses, where the risk of fire was too great.

== Types of coverage ==
There are three types of insurance coverage. Replacement cost coverage pays the cost of repairing or replacing the property with like kind & quality regardless of depreciation or appreciation. Premiums for this type of coverage are based on replacement cost values, and not based on actual cash value. Actual cash value coverage provides for replacement cost minus depreciation. Extended replacement cost will pay over the coverage limit if the costs for construction have increased. This generally will not exceed 25% of the limit. When obtaining an insurance policy, the limit is the maximum amount of benefit the insurance company will pay for a given situation or occurrence. Limits also include the ages below or above what an insurance company will not issue a new policy or continue a policy.

This amount will need to fluctuate if the cost to replace homes in a neighborhood is rising; the amount needs to be in step with the actual reconstruction value of the home. In case of a fire, household content replacement is tabulated as a percentage of the value of the home. In case of high-value items, the insurance company may ask to specifically cover these items separate from the other household contents. One last coverage option is to have alternative living arrangements included in a policy. If property damage caused by a covered loss prevents a person from living in their home, policies can pay the expenses of alternate living arrangements (e.g., hotels and restaurant costs) for a specified period of time to compensate for the "loss of use" of the home until the owners can return. The additional living expenses limit can vary, but is typically set at up to 20% of the dwelling coverage limit. Owners need to talk with their insurance company for advice about appropriate coverage and determine what type of limit may be appropriate.

== US Property Insurance Claims ==
=== World Trade Center case ===
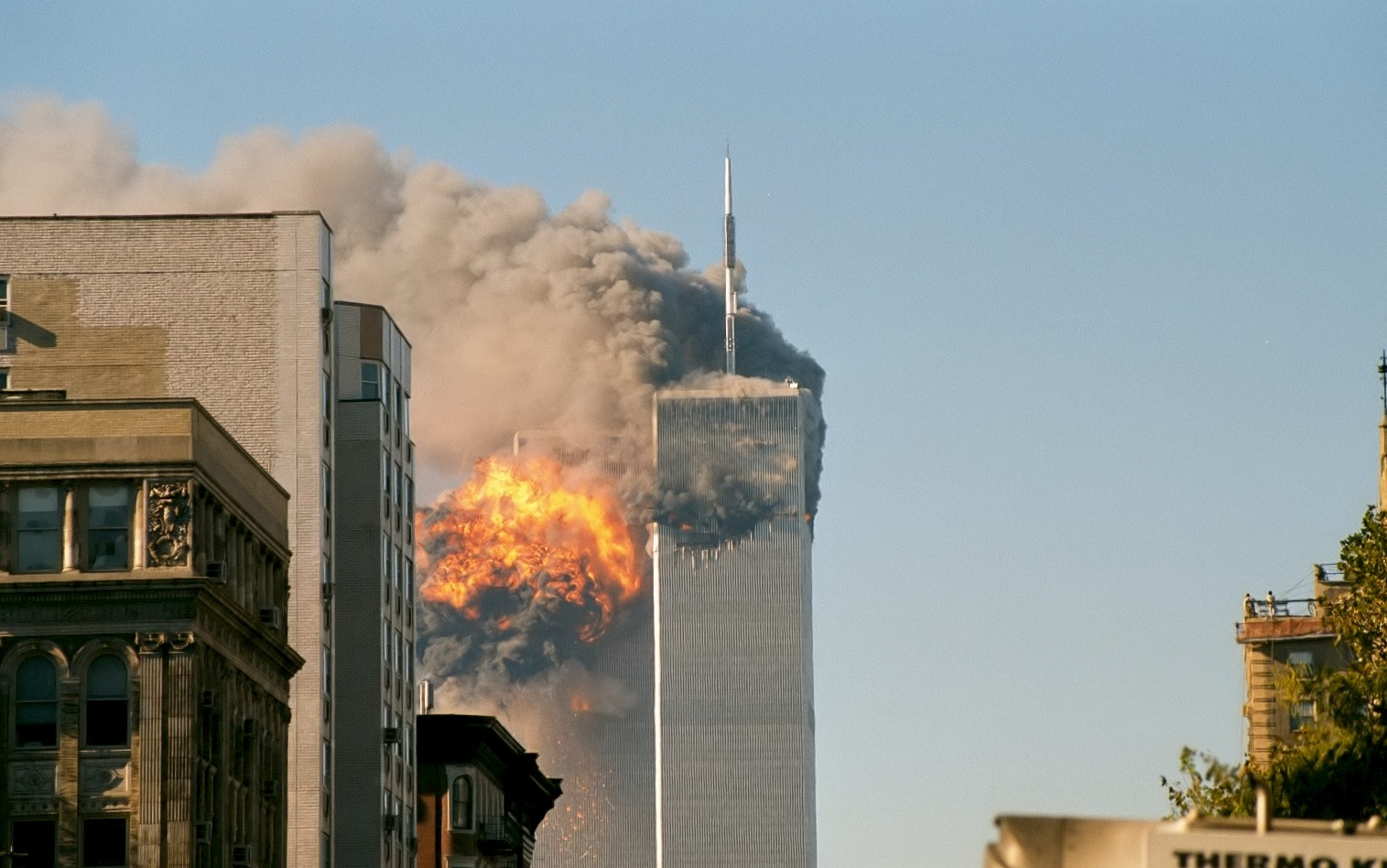
Attack on the World Trade Center

Following the September 11 attacks, a jury deliberated insurance payouts for the destruction of the World Trade Center. Leaseholder Larry A. Silverstein sought more than $7 billion in insurance money; he argued two attacks had occurred at the WTC. Its insurers—including Chubb Corp. and Swiss Reinsurance Co.—claimed the "coordinated" attack counted as a single event. In December 2004 the federal jury arrived at a compromise decision.

In May 2007 New York Governor Eliot Spitzer announced more than $4.5 billion would be made available to rebuild the 16-acre (65,000 m^{2}) WTC complex as part of a major insurance claims settlement.

=== Post-Hurricane Katrina property insurance claims ===
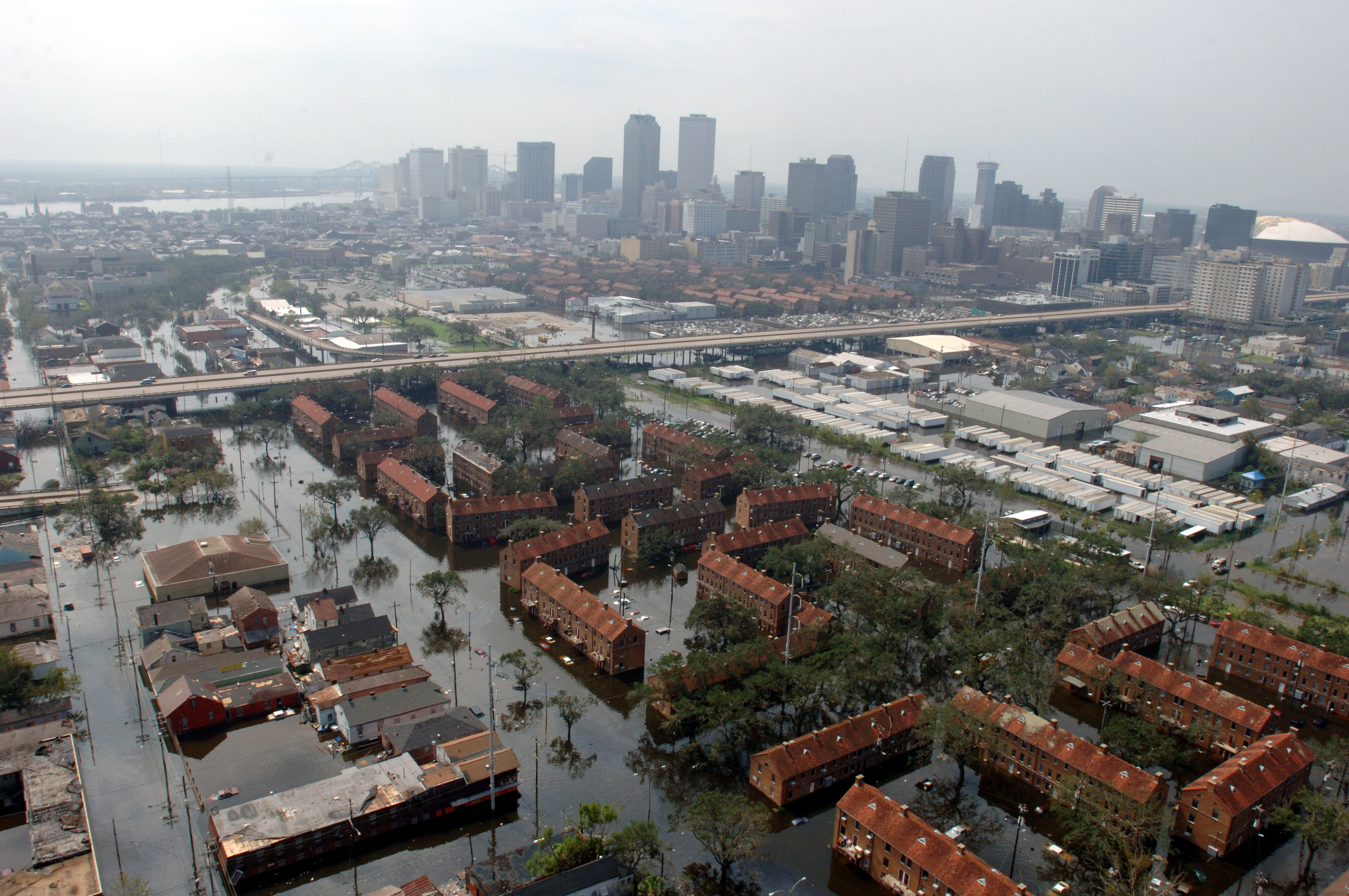
New Orleans in the aftermath of Hurricane Katrina

In the wake of Hurricane Katrina, several thousand homeowners filed lawsuits against their insurance companies accusing them of bad faith and failing to properly and promptly adjust their claims.

=== Florida Consumer Choice Act ===
On 24 June 2009, Florida Governor Charlie Crist vetoed the Consumer Choice Act (H.B. 1171). The bill would have trumped state regulation, and allowed Florida's biggest insurance companies to establish their own rates.

Remarking upon State Farm's pullout from Florida, Ted Corless, a property insurance attorney who has represented large insurance carriers like Nationwide, noted "that homeowners are really going to have to look out for themselves". Five days after Crist vetoed the Consumer Choice Act, Corless defended property insurance deregulation by pointing out that "if the blue-chip insurance companies wanted to price themselves out of the market", then they would go out of business. He accused Crist of making choices on behalf of consumers, not protecting their right to choose. In 2006 the average Florida annual insurance premium was $1,386 for a homeowner, one of the highest in the country.

In May 2022, Florida lawmakers have signed off on quick fixes to the state's property insurance crisis but critics say the plan pays little attention to the growing threat of climate change. Governor Ron DeSantis signed bipartisan legislation implementing the most significant and comprehensive property insurance reforms Florida has seen in decades to provide short- and long-term relief to Floridians to combat skyrocketing insurance costs.

== Fire insurance in India ==
Fire insurance business in India is governed by the All India Fire Tariff that lays down the terms of coverage, the premium rates and the conditions of the fire policy. The fire insurance policy has been renamed as "Standard Fire and Special Perils Policy".

=== Standard Fire and Special Perils Policy (SFSP) ===
The Standard Fire and Special Perils Policy (SFSP) is a kind of traditional insurance product that is specially designed to protect your property and its articles from the unforeseen unfortunate accidents caused due to fire and the allied perils. With multiple extensions, this policy not only keeps your property secure but also lessens the extent of the loss or damage that you may suffer causing a huge financial burden, and thus, it provides you relief from such anxiety. The risks covered are as follows:

- Dwellings, offices, shops, hospitals:
- Industrial, manufacturing risks
- Utilities located outside industrial/manufacturing risks
- Machinery and accessories
- Storage risks outside the compound of industrial risks
- Tank farms/gas holders located outside the compound of industrial risks

=== Perils covered ===
The following causes of loss are covered:

- Fire
- Lightning
- Explosion, implosion
- Aircraft damage
- Riot, strike
- Terrorism
- Storm, cyclone, typhoon, tempest, hurricane, tornado, flood & inundation.
- Impact damage
- Malicious damage
- Subsidence, landslide
- Bursting or overflowing of tanks
- Missile testing operations
- Bush fire

=== Exclusions ===
The following are excluded from insurance coverage:

- Loss or damage caused by war, civil war, and kindred perils
- Loss or damage caused by nuclear activity
- Loss or damage to the stocks in cold storage caused by change in temperature
- Loss or damage due to over-running of electric and/or electronic machines

Claims In the event of a fire loss covered under the fire insurance policy, the insured shall immediately give notice thereof to the insurance company. Within 15 days of the occurrence of such loss the insured should submit a claim in writing giving the details of damages and their estimated values. Details of other insurances on the same property should also be declared.

== See also ==
- Builder's risk insurance
- Financial risk management § Insurance
- Home insurance
- Insurable interest
- Owner-controlled insurance program
- Renters insurance
- Vehicle insurance
