= Pipeline attack =

Several attacks have been carried out on pipelines:

- Nord Stream pipelines sabotage (natural gas)
- Natural gas pipeline and electricity line sabotage in the country of Georgia, precipitating the 2006 Russia–Georgia energy crisis
- Colonial Pipeline ransomware attack (gasoline)
- The Trans-Alaska Pipeline System has been shot at several times and twice had major leaks from holes blown in it
- Protesters physically blocked construction of the Keystone XL Pipeline for a time
- Oil pipelines in Nigeria have been vandalized during the Conflict in the Niger Delta
