= Rate making =

Rate making, or insurance pricing, is the determination of rates charged by insurance companies. The benefit of rate making is to ensure insurance companies are setting fair and adequate premiums given the competitive nature.

== Fundamental rate-making definitions ==
The following are fundamental terms that are commonly used in rate making. A rate "is the price per unit of insurance for each exposure unit, which is the unit of measurement used in insurance pricing". The exposure unit is used to establish insurance premiums by examining parallel groups.

The pure premium "refers to that portion of that rate needed to pay losses and loss-adjustment expenses". The loading "refers to the amount of the premium necessary to cover other expenses, particularly sales expenses, and to allow for a profit". The gross rate "is the pure premium and the loading per exposure unit". Finally, the gross premium is the premium paid by the insured consisting of the gross rate multiplied by the number of exposure units.

== Objectives in rate making ==
Rate making has several objectives under regulatory requirements regulated by the states and business objectives due to the goal of profitability: The goal of insurance regulation is to protect the public and three regulatory objectives are placed to meet certain standards:

- The first regulatory requirement is that rates must be adequate; meaning the rates the insurers charge should be able to cover expenses.
- The second regulatory requirement is that rates must not be excessive; meaning rates should not be so high that policyholders are paying more than the actual value of their protection.
- The third regulatory objective is the rates must not be unfairly discriminatory; meaning exposures that are similar with respect to losses and expenses should not be charged significantly different rates.

The business objectives are set as a guide for insurers while designing the rating system. The rating system should meet each of the four objectives:

- For producers to be able to quote premiums with a minimum amount of their time and expense, the rating system should be easy to understand.
- To maintain customer satisfaction, the rates should remain stable over short periods of time. The rapid change of rates could lead to customer dissatisfaction.
- To meet the objective of rate adequacy, the rates should be responsive over time in comparison with changing economic conditions and loss exposures.
- Finally, to reduce the frequency and severity of losses, the rating system should encourage loss control activities. Loss control is important in insurance because it tends to keep insurance affordable.

== Rate making methods ==
In property and casualty insurance, there are three basic rate-making methods:

- Judgment Rating is used when the factors that determine potential losses are varied and cannot easily be quantified. There are no statistics regarding quantity of future losses and probability. This means an underwriter rates each exposure individually.
- The second rate making method is class rating, or manual rating. This rating means that exposures with similar characteristics are placed in the same underwriting class, and each is charged the same rate. The advantage of class rating lies with its easy application and ability to quickly be obtained.
- The third rate making method is merit rating. This rating means a plan which class rates, or manual rates are adjusted upward or downward based on individual loss experience. Merit rating is based on the assumption of loss experience will differ substantially from other loss experience

== Rate making in life insurance ==
Life insurance actuaries determine the probability of death in any given year, and based on this probability determine the expected value of the loss payment. These expected future payment are discounted back to the start of the coverage period and summed to determine the net single premium. The net single premium may be leveled to convert to installment premiums. A loading for expenses is added to determine the gross premium. With determining life expectancy, age is the most important factor, other significant factors are sex of the individual and smoking. Thus, an actuary can reasonably estimate the average age of death for a group of 25-year-old males, who don't smoke.
