= Nord Stream AG =

Operators of the Nord Stream 1 pipeline

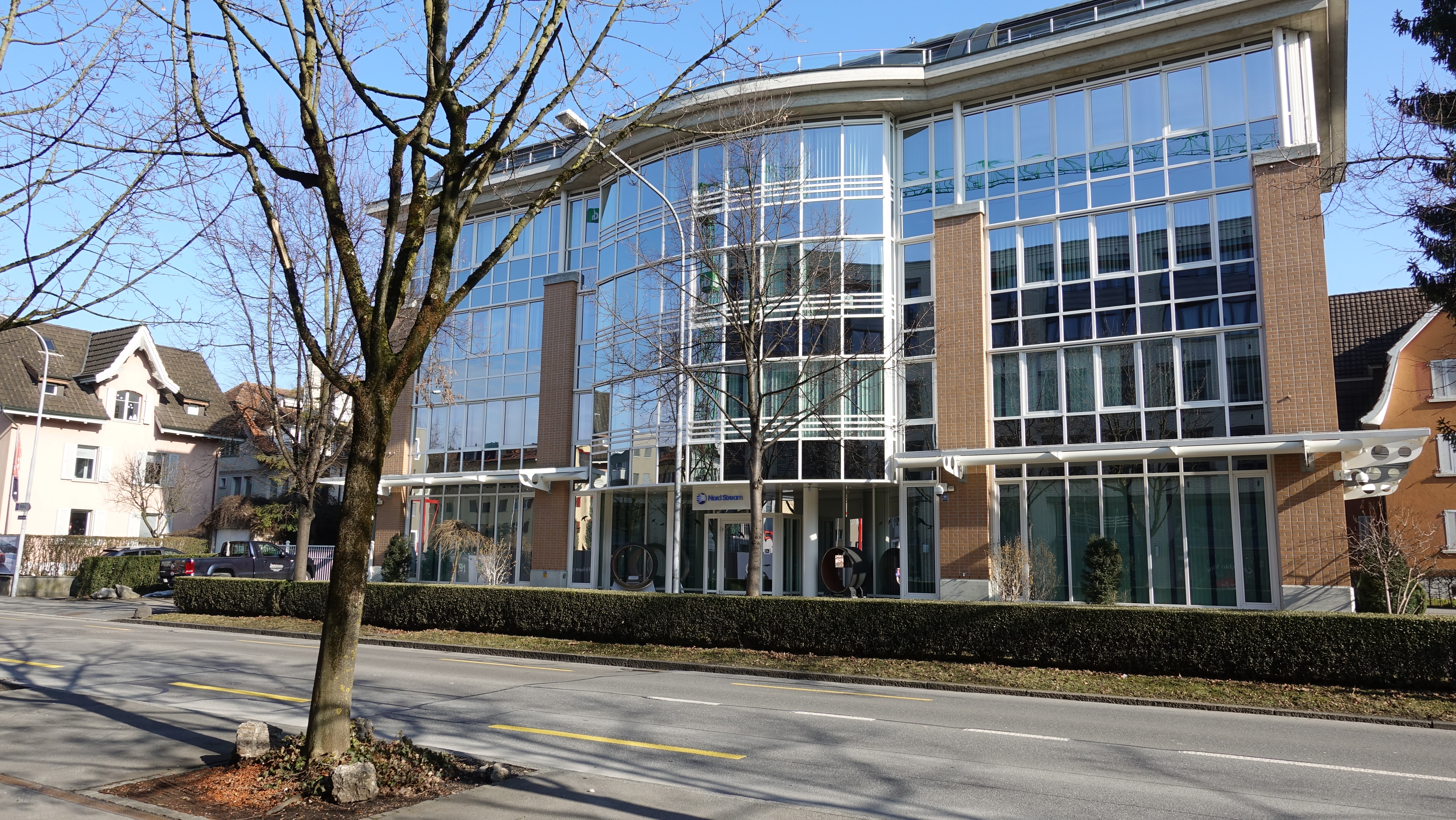
- Nord Stream head-office building in Zug
- Type: Joint stock company
- Industry: Natural gas
- Founded: 30 November 2005
- Headquarters: Zug, Switzerland
- Services: Natural gas transportation
- Website: www.nord-stream.com

Nord Stream AG (Note: until 4 October 2006 known as the North European Gas Pipeline Company) is a consortium for construction and operation of the Nord Stream 1 submarine pipeline between Vyborg in Russia and Greifswald in Germany. The consortium was incorporated in Zug, Switzerland, on 30 November 2005.

Since the first gas delivery in 2011, the company has transported over 450 billion cubic metres of natural gas to Europe. In 2020, the German Federal Network Agency highlighted again the Nord Stream Pipeline's contribution to security of energy supply in Europe.

Gas deliveries ceased on 31 August 2022, officially for three days of maintenance. However on 2 September 2022, the company announced that natural gas supplies via the Nord Stream 1 pipeline would remain shut off indefinitely until the main gas turbine at the Portovaya compressor station near St Petersburg was fixed due to an engine oil leak. Finally, on 26 September 2022 both pipelines of Nord Stream 1 were sabotaged beyond repair. Due to the Russian invasion of Ukraine Germany had halted the permitting process for Nord Stream 2 which although technically ready had therefore never delivered gas when also one of its two pipelines was destroyed by the Nord Stream sabotage.

In July 2026 London's High Court ruled against Nord Stream AG's 579 million Euro insurance claim for the Nord Stream Pipeline sabotage reasoning that a war exclusion clause applied with the Russo-Ukrainian war being a significant cause for the sabotage even if no specific perpetrator of the sabotage could be identified.

== Shareholders ==
The shareholders of Nord Stream AG are:

- Gazprom International Projects LLC, a subsidiary of Gazprom – 51%
- Wintershall Dea AG – 15.5%
- PEG Infrastruktur AG, a subsidiary of E.ON Beteiligungen – 15.5%
- N.V. Nederlandse Gasunie – 9%
- Engie – 9%

On 1 March 2010, French energy company GDF Suez (changed name to Engie in 2015) signed with Gazprom a memorandum of understanding to acquire 9% stake in the project. Accordingly, the stakes of Wintershall and E.ON fell by 4.5% to 15.5%.
