= War risk insurance =

Insurance that covers losses arising from war, terrorism, or other hostile acts

War risk insurance is a type of insurance which covers damage due to acts of war, including invasion, insurrection, rebellion and hijacking. Some policies also cover damage due to weapons of mass destruction. It is most commonly used in the shipping and aviation industries. Unlike regular insurance policies, war risk policies do not include a broad war exclusion clause.

War risk insurance generally has two components: war risk liability, which covers people and items inside the craft and is calculated based on the indemnity amount; and war risk hull, which covers the craft itself and is calculated based on the value of the craft. The premium varies based on the expected stability of the countries to which the vessel will travel.

Private war risk insurance policies for aircraft were temporarily cancelled following the September 11, 2001 attacks and later reinstated with substantially lower indemnities. In the wake of this cancellation, the US Congress passed the Terrorism Risk Insurance Act to backstop insurance policies offered to commercial airlines. The International Air Transport Association has argued that airlines operating in states which do not provide war risk insurance are at a competitive disadvantage in this area.

== See also ==
- Political risk insurance
- Democratic peace theory
