= Terrorism insurance =

Financial coverage against terrorist attacks

Terrorism insurance is insurance purchased by property owners to cover their potential losses and liabilities that might occur due to terrorist activities.

It is considered to be a difficult product for insurance companies, as the odds of terrorist attacks are very difficult to predict and the potential liability enormous. For example, the September 11, 2001 attacks resulted in an estimated $31.7 billion loss. This combination of uncertainty and potentially huge losses makes the setting of premiums a difficult matter. Most insurance companies therefore exclude terrorism from coverage in casualty and property insurance, or else require endorsements to provide coverage.

== Industry needs ==
Concentration of risk is another factor in determining availability for terrorism insurance. Due to the concentrated losses of the World Trade Center, carriers were hit with large losses in one centralized location. Insurers seek to spread the coverage over a wider geographic area than as with other aggregate perils, such as flood.

== Modelling the risks ==
Insurance companies are using an approach that is similar to that used with natural catastrophe risks. A Swiss report suggested that in this case where demand is greater than the supply for terrorism coverage that a short-term solution is possible: a mix of government and private resource to make easy the transition. In this situation, the government would serve two functions: to establish rules to overcome the capacity shortage and to be the insurer of last resort.

== By country ==
=== France ===
In France, a pool of insurers and reinsurers was set up on 1 January 2002 under the name Gestion de l'Assurance et de la RÉassurance des risques attentats et Actes de Terrorisme (GAREAT). GAREAT is constituted upon the principle of mutuality between its Members, all of whom are jointly liable, and relies on the support given to GAREAT by international reinsurers as well as by the French State which provides unlimited coverage to the GAREAT programme via unlimited treaties reinsured 100% by Caisse Centrale de Réassurance (CCR). As a non-profit-making Economic Interest Grouping mandated by its Members, GAREAT returns to the latter that part of the premiums which are not used to finance the reinsurance coverage at the close of each year.

=== Germany ===
The Extremus Versicherung, founded in 2002, is a private company that insures terrorism risks in Germany. While the first 2.5 billion € in damages are covered by the insurance, the German government guarantees a further 6.5 billion € in insurance pay-outs.

=== Netherlands ===
Insurance payments related to terrorism are restricted to a billion euro per year for all insurance companies together. This regards property insurance, but also life insurance, medical insurance, etc.

=== Iraq ===
The New York Times reports that in Baghdad personal terrorism insurance is available. One company offers such insurance for $90, and if the customer is a victim of terrorism in the next year, it pays the heirs $3,500.

=== United States ===
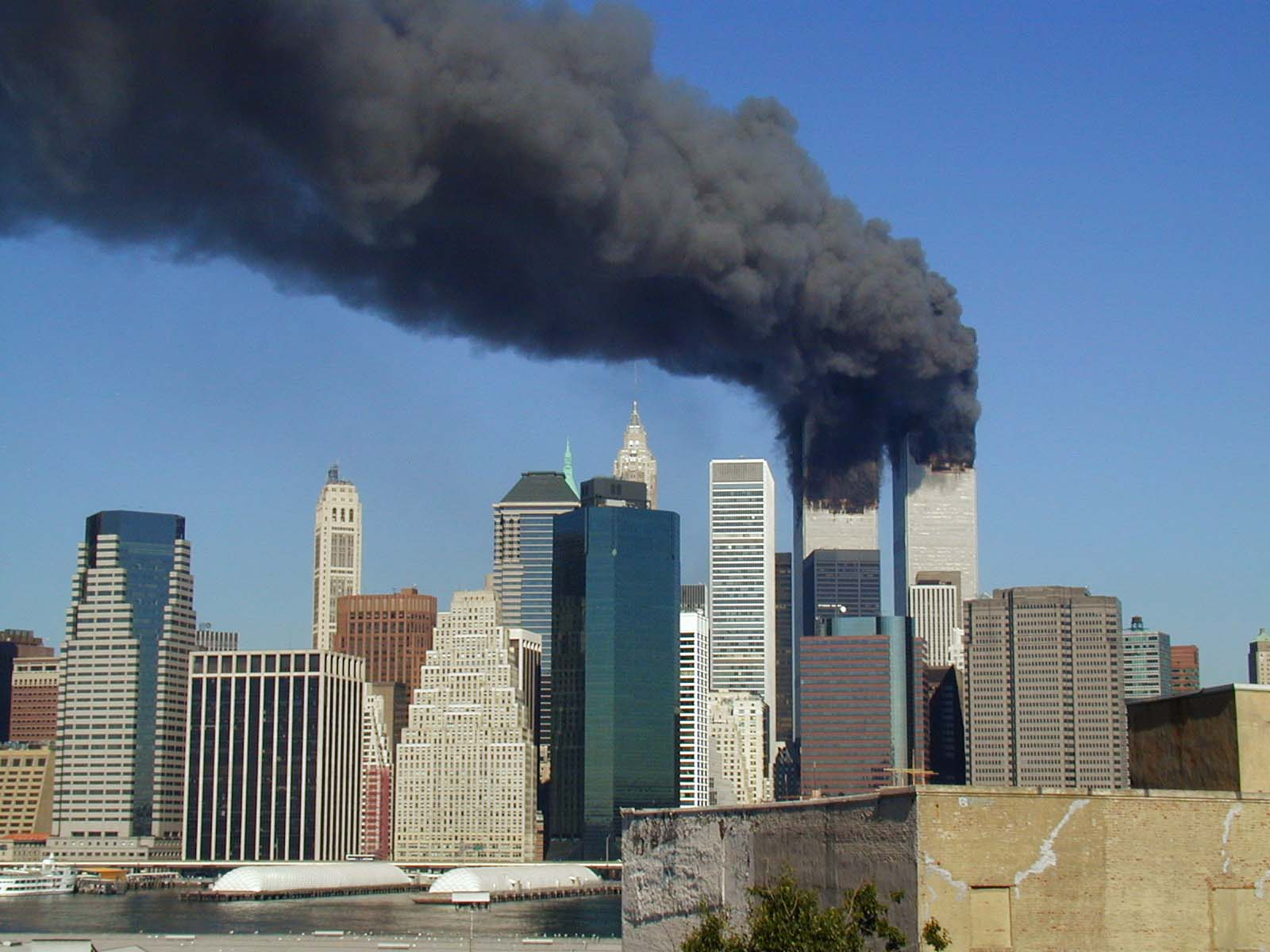
The demand for terrorism insurance surged in the United States after the September 11 attacks

In 2002, the US Congress enacted the Terrorism Risk Insurance Act, in which the government shared the cost of large insurance losses.

On December 26, 2007, the President of the United States signed into law the Terrorism Risk Insurance Program Reauthorization Act of 2007 which extends the Terrorism Risk Insurance Act (TRIA) through December 31, 2014. The law extends the temporary federal Program that provides for a transparent system of shared public and private compensation for insured losses resulting from acts of terrorism.

Some economists have supported U.S. government subsidies of terrorism insurance. Soon after the 9/11 terrorist attacks, economist Edwin Mills expressed concern over whether private developers could build real estate without subsidies for insurance. Economist David R. Barker argued that properly structured subsidies could increase overall economic efficiency. Other economists have argued against these subsidies.

The United States insurance market offers coverage to the majority of large companies which ask for it in their policies. The price of the policy depends on where the clients are residing and how much limit they buy.

According to The Economist, one of the best studies to understand TRIA has been the one undertaken in 2005 by the Center for Risk Management at the Wharton Business School ("TRIA and Beyond"; available on their website below).

In mid-2007 the idea of another extension to TRIA was tabled and is officially known as TRIREA, (Terrorism Risk Insurance Revision and Extension Act). Initially TRIREA contained several new provisions including a mandatory 'make available' clause for NCBR coverage (Nuclear, Chemical, Biological and Radiological) and the ending of the distinction between domestic and foreign events.

The act expired on December 31, 2014, but was renewed at the start of the next congress, with Obama signing the extension of the TIRA through 2020 on January 12, 2015. Up until the 2014 expiration, many experts warned that "construction projects could be stalled and commercial loans on shopping malls, utilities and skyscrapers could be in jeopardy." In addition, according to The Baltimore Sun, the National Football League denied rumors that it would cancel the Super Bowl over the issue.

=== United Kingdom ===
In the UK, following the Baltic Exchange bomb in 1992, all UK insurers stopped including terrorism coverage on their commercial insurance policies with effect from 1 January 1993 (home insurance policies were unaffected). As a consequence, the government and insurance industry established the Pool Reinsurance Company Ltd (Pool Re). Primarily funded by premiums paid by policyholders, the government guarantees the fund although any such support must be repaid from future premiums. To date, despite paying over £600 million in relation to thirteen separate claims, no government support has been necessary.

== Countries with long-term terrorism insurance programmes ==
According to the policy agenda of The Real Estate Roundtable, long-term terrorism insurance is available in the following countries:

1. Australia
2. Austria
3. Finland
4. France
5. Germany
6. Israel
7. Namibia
8. Netherlands
9. Russia
10. South Africa
11. Spain
12. Switzerland
13. Turkey
14. United Kingdom
15. India

== See also ==
- Security
- Geneva Association (also known as the International Association for the Study of Insurance Economics)
- Pool Re
