= Technisch Weekblad =

Dutch newspaper

- Type: Weekly newspaper
- Owner: Bèta Publishers
- Editor: Erwin Boutsma
- Language: Dutch
- Headquarters: The Hague, Netherlands
- Website: Technisch Weekblad

Technisch Weekblad (literally Technical Weekly Magazine) is a Dutch weekly newspaper specialising in engineering topics.

== History and profile ==
The magazine was created in 1994 from a merger of Polytechnisch Weekblad and the engineers magazine of the Koninklijk Instituut van Ingenieurs (KIVI, the Royal Institute of Engineers). In 2005 the magazine was sold by publisher VNU to Bèta Publishers, which had grown out of Koninklijke Nederlandse Chemische Vereniging (KNCV).

The focus of Technisch Weekblad is on short reports on technical developments, the job market for engineers and government policies regarding technology. Its income is based on subscriptions and advertising.

Corresponding magazines are Ingeniøren in Denmark, Ny Teknik in Sweden and Teknisk Ukeblad in Norway.
