= Ny Teknik =

Swedish technical magazine

- Editor-in-chief: Thomas Peterssohn
- Frequency: 18 print editions/year + daily online
- Circulation: 184 000 (2024)
- Publisher: Ny Teknik News AB
- First issue: 26 October 1967; 58 years ago
- Country: Sweden
- Based in: Stockholm
- Language: Swedish
- Website: www.nyteknik.se

Ny Teknik (lit. New Technology) is a weekly Swedish magazine with news, debates and ads in the field of technology and engineering. It is published in Stockholm, Sweden.

== History and profile ==
Ny Teknik was launched on 18 October 1967. Its former publisher was Ekonomi och Teknik Förlag AB. The magazine is headquartered in Stockholm and is published by Talentum Sweden.

It is distributed to all members of the Swedish Association of Graduate Engineers. The magazine mostly covered news about inventions until 1997 when a new section, Frontlinjen (lit. Front Line), was started to feature news on technological research. The magazine also includes news on the effects of technology on society, IT and telecom.

As of 2006, the editor-in-chief was Lars Nilsson. Susanna Baltscheffsky also served as the editor-in-chief. Jan Huss is the editor-in-chief of the magazine. Corresponding publications are Ingeniøren in Denmark, Teknisk Ukeblad in Norway and Technisch Weekblad in the Netherlands.

Ny Teknik had a circulation of 146,500 copies in 2006, 153,900 copies in 2008 and 156,400 copies in 2010.
