= War exclusion clause =

Insurance policy clause

A war exclusion clause or hostile acts exclusion is a common clause in insurance policies which excludes damage arising from a warlike act between sovereign or quasi-sovereign entities. Insurance companies typically will not cover damages caused by war because such an event could cause damage that would be likely to bankrupt them if they had to cover it.

Example: You are not insured for: war, civil war, revolution, rebellion, insurrection, or civil strife arising therefrom or any hostile act by or against a belligerent power, capture, seizure, arrest, restraint or detainment (piracy excepted), and the consequences thereof or any attempt thereat, derelict mines, torpedoes, bombs or other derelict weapons of war

Companies and individuals faced with a significant risk of war, such as companies located in politically unstable countries, may be able to purchase a separate war risk insurance policy.

In the US, the Terrorism Risk Insurance Act provides a "backstop" for insurance claims related to acts of terrorism.

== Issues ==
There are a number of possible points of contention with such a clause – in particular whether certain acts of terrorism or cyberattacks are covered.

In Germany, nearly a century after the end of World War II, unexploded ordnance remains a problem. Damages caused by controlled or uncontrolled explosions from World War II-era aerial bombs are not consistently covered by private insurance policies, although the German government covers costs for damage caused by German-made munitions.

== See also ==
- Terrorism insurance
- Cyber insurance
- Contract adjustment board
