= Pool Re =

British reinsurance firm

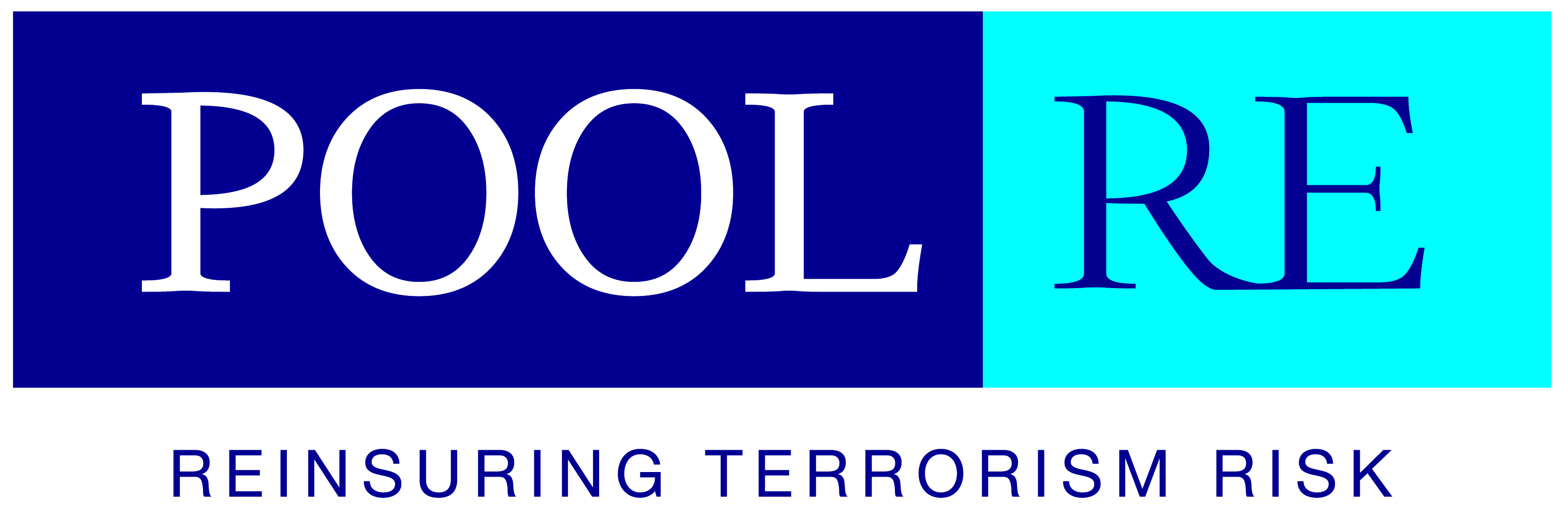
Pool Reinsurance Company Ltd

Pool Reinsurance Company Limited, also known as Pool Re, was set up in 1993 by the insurance industry in cooperation with the UK Government in the wake of the IRA bombing of the Baltic Exchange in 1992.

Pool Re is a mutual reinsurer whose members comprise the vast majority of insurers and Lloyd’s Syndicates which offer commercial property insurance in the UK, with membership of the scheme affording them a guarantee which ensures that they can provide cover for losses resulting from acts of terrorism, regardless of the scale of the claims.

The Scheme, which was the first public/private partnership to cover insured losses caused by acts of terrorism, is owned by its members but is underpinned by a HM Treasury commitment to support Pool Re if ever it has insufficient funds to pay a legitimate claim. Pool Re pays a premium to the Government for this guarantee and would repay the money over time if it ever used this facility.

In the event of a loss resulting from an act of terrorism, each member must first pay losses up to a threshold that is determined individually for each insurer. If losses exceed that threshold, the insurer can claim upon Pool Re’s reserves. These reserves have been accumulated by the members of Pool Re since its inception. It is only in the event that these reserves are exhausted that Pool Re would draw upon Government support.

== History ==
Pool Re was established following a series of terrorist incidents in the early 1990s in London and elsewhere in England related to the situation in Northern Ireland at that time. The cost of these losses caused insurers and reinsurers to consider ceasing to provide terrorism cover for commercial properties because of the high potential cost of losses and the lack of any reliable method of estimating what the future loss experience might be. Insurers depend on reinsurers for financial protection when very large claims occur and, accordingly, both insurers and reinsurers decided they could no longer provide terrorism cover using traditional methods. A withdrawal of terrorism insurance that left areas of business unprotected would potentially have had serious consequences for the UK economy. It became necessary, therefore, to devise a new mechanism for providing this type of cover, without leaving insurers or reinsurers open to substantial losses for which there was no reliable method of calculating accurate premiums.

During the latter part of 1992 it became clear that any new scheme would require the joint involvement of the insurance industry and government. Following extensive dialogue, a suitable structure emerged and the details of the Pool Re scheme were developed. The Pool Re scheme began operations in 1993 and has subsequently been involved in claims arising from thirteen separate terrorism incidents covering losses of over £600 million.

== Changes to the scheme ==
Since its inception, the scheme has adapted to changing circumstances in the insurance market. The most significant changes occurred after the attacks in America on September 11th 2001, which caused insurers and reinsurers to reconsider the way terrorism coverage should be offered. Until that date the conventional insurance and reinsurance market had been willing to dovetail the cover they provided with that available from the Pool Re scheme. Pool Re’s cover to insurers was restricted to damage caused by acts involving fire or explosion, and the international reinsurance market covered other types of terrorism. After 9/11, however, reinsurers were no longer in a position to do so. Had Pool Re continued with these restrictions, insurers would have been unable to provide their customers with cover for terrorist events not involving fire or explosion. In an attempt to avoid this situation, there were discussions between representatives of the insurance industry, buyers of insurance, the UK government, Pool Re and others. In July 2002 an agreement was reached to widen cover and amend certain other features of the scheme in a way that responded to these changing needs. In particular, Pool Re’s cover was extended to an “all risks” basis, and no longer restricted to fire or explosion. In addition, exclusions relating to chemical, biological, radiological or nuclear (CBRN) attack were removed. Risks related to war and cyber threats are still excluded until April 2018.

== Cyber-Terrorism cover ==
On November 15, 2017, Steve Coates, the chief underwriter for Pool Re, announced wider cover, which now includes cyber-terrorism, and will be available from April 2018. The scope of its cover is designed to protect commercial property and will be offered as standard to all policyholders buying terrorism insurance from a Pool Re Member.

"The cover is effectively Material Damage and direct Business Interruption (BI), so BI flows only from events happening at the policyholder’s premises. We will not be providing cover for intangible assets, specifically Money and Data, which are more appropriately covered by the cyber market."

== See also ==
- Terrorism Risk Insurance Act
- Australian Reinsurance Pool Corporation
- Terrorism insurance

== Notes ==
- Thomann, Christian, ed. (2004). "3. Definitions of terrorism". War, terrorism and insurance in Europe after September 11, 2001. Verlag Versicherungswirtsch. pp. 36–41. ISBN 3-89952-161-7.
