= Teknisk Ukeblad =

Norwegian engineering magazine

Teknisk Ukeblad (TU, English: Technical Weekly Magazine) is a Norwegian engineering magazine. The magazine has its headquarters in Oslo, Norway.

== History and profile ==
TU has appeared weekly since 13 April 1883 and was published by Ingeniørforlaget, now Teknisk Ukeblad Media jointly owned by three national professional associations of engineers and architects: the Norwegian Society of Engineers and Technologists (NITO, founded 1936), Tekna (founded in 1874), and the Norwegian Polytechnic Society (PF, founded 1852).

On 24 June 2010 TU had a total circulation of 302,000 weekly copies.

Corresponding publications are Ny Teknik in Sweden, Ingeniøren in Denmark and Technisch Weekblad in the Netherlands.
