= Casualty insurance =

Insurance not directly concerned with life, health, or property insurance

Casualty insurance is a defined term which broadly encompasses insurance not directly concerned with life insurance, health insurance, or property insurance. It is sometimes combined with property to form the term, Property and Casualty Insurance (P&C).

Casualty insurance is mainly liability coverage of an individual or organization for negligent acts or omissions. However, the term has also been used for property insurance, aviation insurance, boiler and machinery insurance, and glass and crime insurance. It may include marine insurance for shipwrecks or losses at sea, fidelity and surety insurance, earthquake insurance, political risk insurance, terrorism insurance, fidelity and surety bonds.

One of the most common kinds of casualty insurance today is automobile insurance. In its most basic form, automobile insurance provides liability coverage in the event that a driver is found "at fault" in an accident. This can cover medical expenses of individuals involved in the accident as well as restitution or repair of damaged property, all of which would fall into the realm of casualty insurance coverage.

If coverage were extended to cover damage to one's own vehicle, or against theft, the policy would no longer be exclusively a casualty insurance policy.

== Definitions ==
The state of Illinois includes vehicle, liability, worker's compensation, glass, livestock, legal expenses, and miscellaneous insurance under its class of casualty insurance.

In 1956, in the preface to the fourth edition of Casualty Insurance Clarence A. Kulp wrote:

Broadly speaking, it may be defined as a list of individual insurances, usually written in a separate policy, in three broad categories: third party or liability, disability or accident, and health, material damage. One of the results of comprehensive policy-writing .... is to raise the question of the usefulness of the traditional concept of casualty insurance ... some insurance men predict that the casualty insurance of the future will include liability and disability lines only.

Later in Chapter 2 the book states that insurance was traditionally classified under life, fire-marine, and casualty. Since multiple-line policies began to be written (insurance contracts covering several types of risks), the last two began to merge.

When the NAIC approved multiple underwriting in 1946, casualty insurance was defined as a blanket term for the legal liability except for marine, disability and medical care, and some damage to physical property.

== Leading property and casualty insurance companies ==
The following companies had the highest direct premium written in 2024.

1. State Farm - $108b
2. Progressive - $75b
3. Berkshire Hathaway - $63b
4. Allstate - $55b
5. Liberty Mutual - $44b

== See also ==
- Wiktionary:casualty
- List of finance topics (Insurance)
