= Ingeniøren =

Danish newspaper

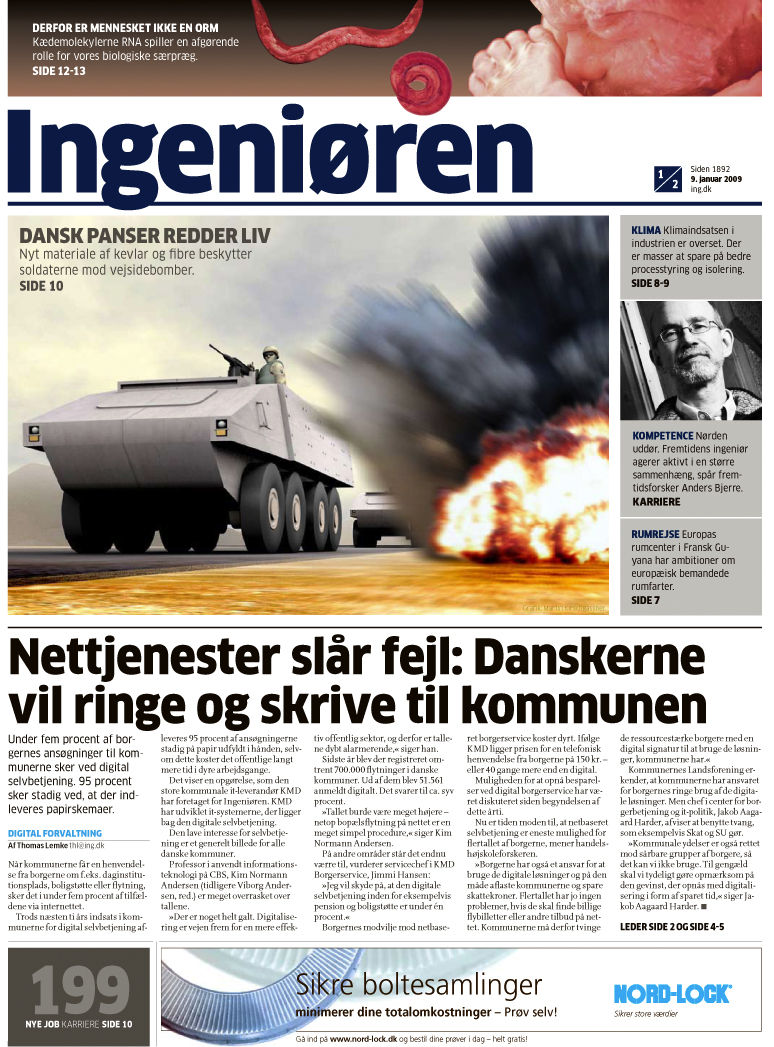
- Type: Weekly newspaper
- Format: Compact
- Owner: Danish Society of Engineers (IDA)
- Publisher: Ingeniøren A/S
- Editor: Arne R. Steinmark
- Founded: 1892
- Language: Danish
- Headquarters: Copenhagen, Denmark
- Website: ing.dk

Ingeniøren (full name: Nyhedsmagasinet Ingeniøren, literally The News Magazine "The Engineer") is a Danish weekly newspaper specialising in engineering topics.

== History and profile ==
The paper has covered science and technology issues as well as political topics and debate related to engineering since 1892, and maintains an online archive of these. The online version began 2 December 1994, as the first Danish internet media.

Corresponding publications are Ny Teknik in Sweden, Teknisk Ukeblad in Norway and Technisch Weekblad in the Netherlands.
