= Bavaria Yachtbau =

German company

Bavaria Yachtbau GmbH
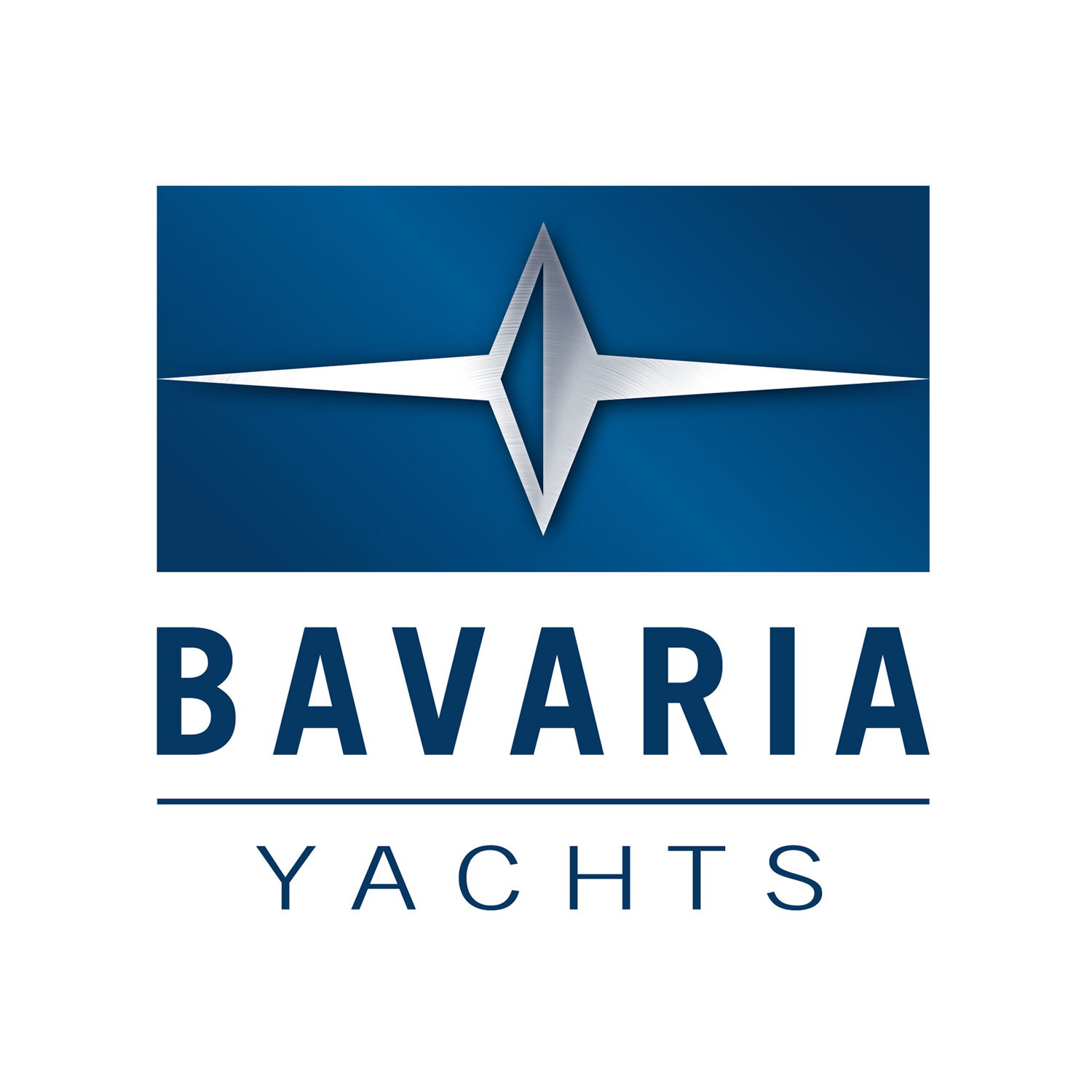
- Type: GmbH
- Industry: Yacht building
- Founded: 1978
- Headquarters: Giebelstadt, Bavaria, Germany
- Key people: Norbert Leifeld (CEO)
- Operating income: not published
- Website: www.bavariayachts.com

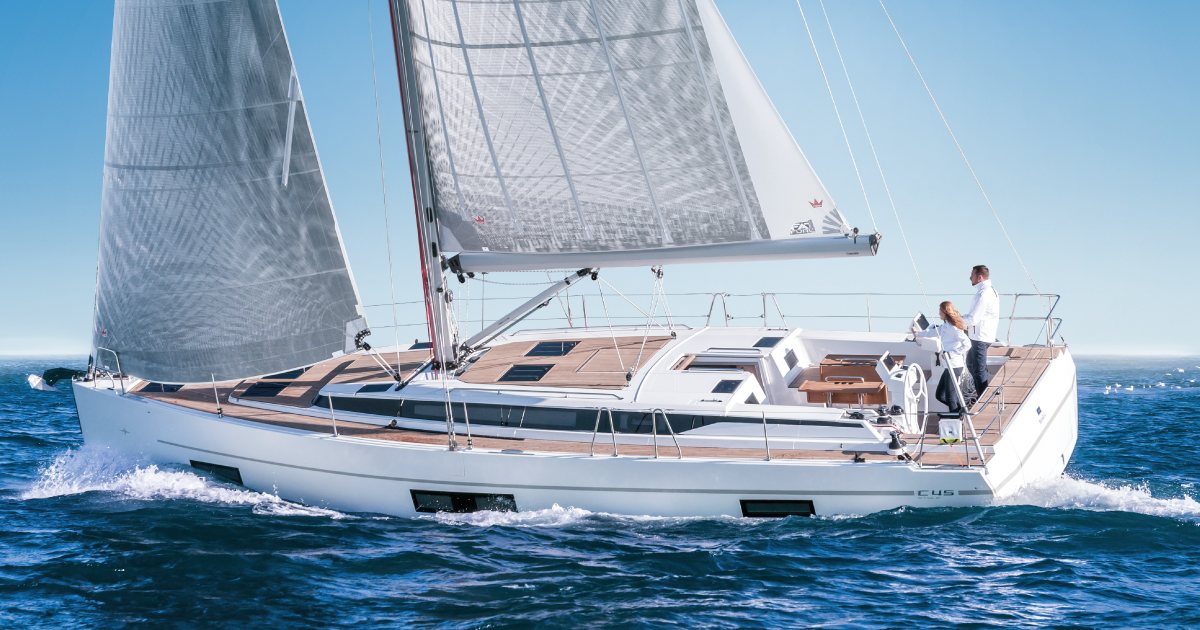
BAVARIA C45

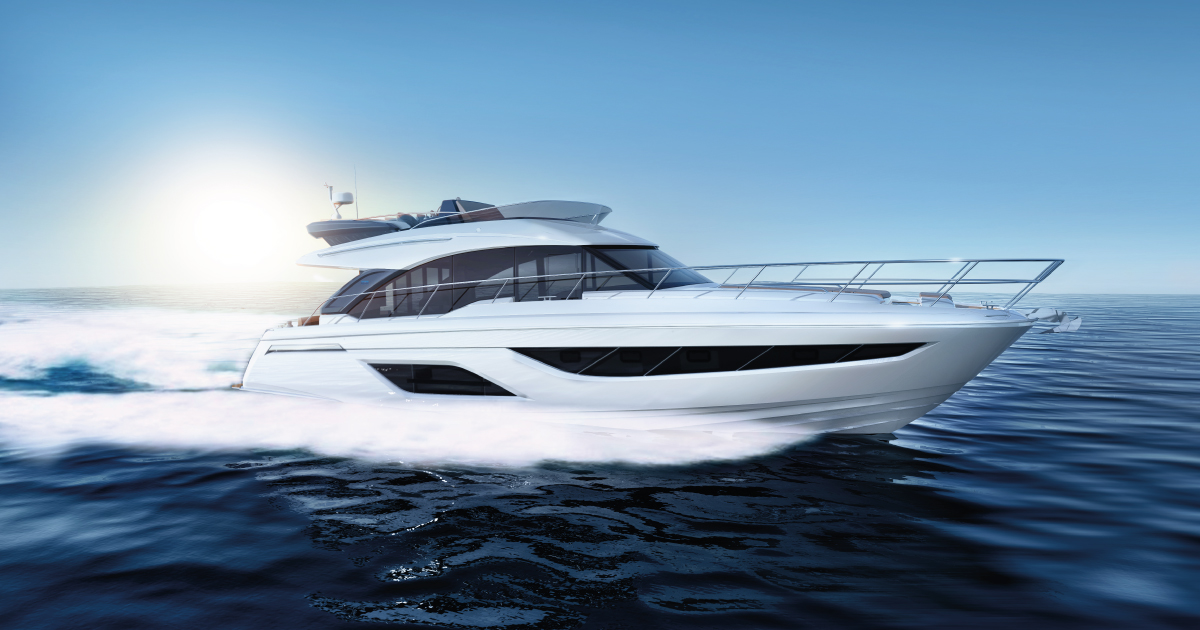
BAVARIA R55

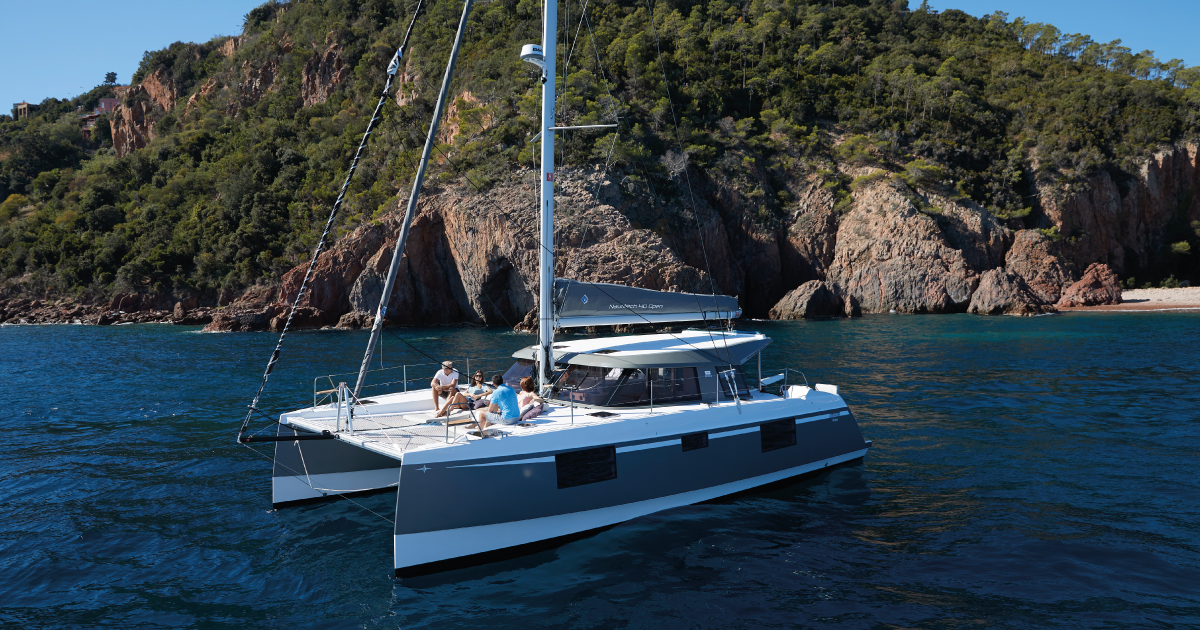
BAVARIA NAUTITECH 40 OPEN

Bavaria Yachtbau GmbH was founded in 1978 by Winfried Herrmann, a window manufacturer, and Josef Meltl, a yacht charter broker. By 2006, the company had grown to produce approximately 3,500 sailing and motor yachts and employing 600 people. Bavaria Yachtbau is one of Europe's largest yacht manufacturers and is the biggest yacht yard in Germany. Bavaria Yachtbau is also one of the top three global market leaders for yachts ranging from 30 to 56 feet.

In June 2007 the US private equity investor, Bain Capital acquired the company from the founders. Although the exact price of the transaction was not disclosed, the purchase price was estimated to be between 1.1 and 1.3 billion Euros. After the market crash of 2008, Bain Capital transferred control to US private equity investors Anchorage Advisors and Oaktree Capital Management, which each took 45 percent of shares in October 2009.

In August 2010, Jens Ludmann was named spokesman of the management board. Prior to being appointed to this position, Ludmann was the Chief Engineer of Ford Motor Company.

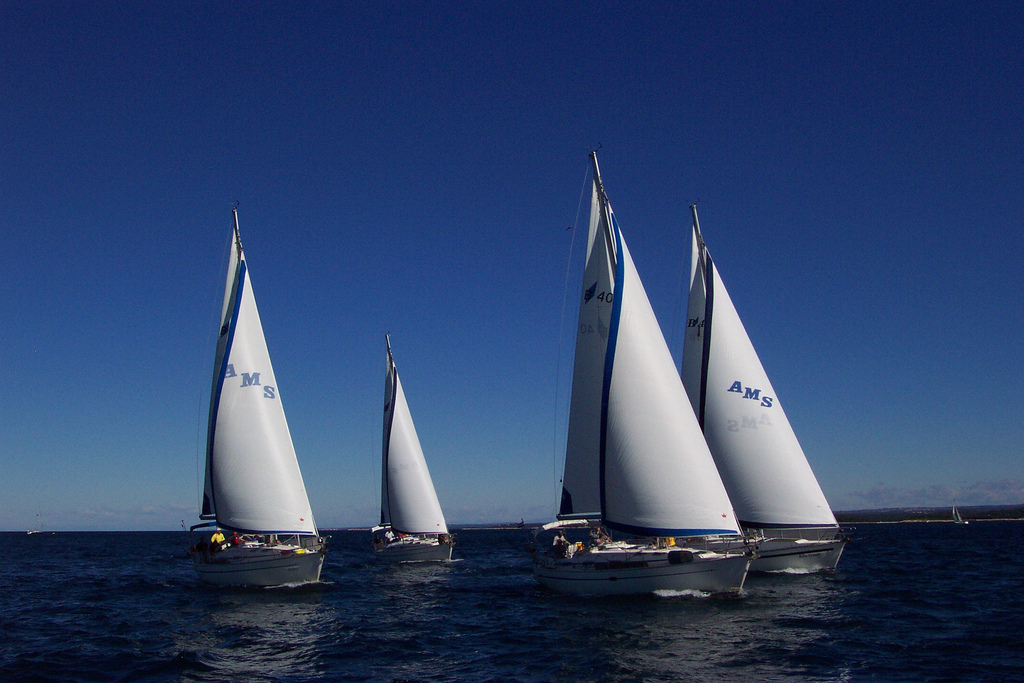
A small fleet of Bavaria yachts racing

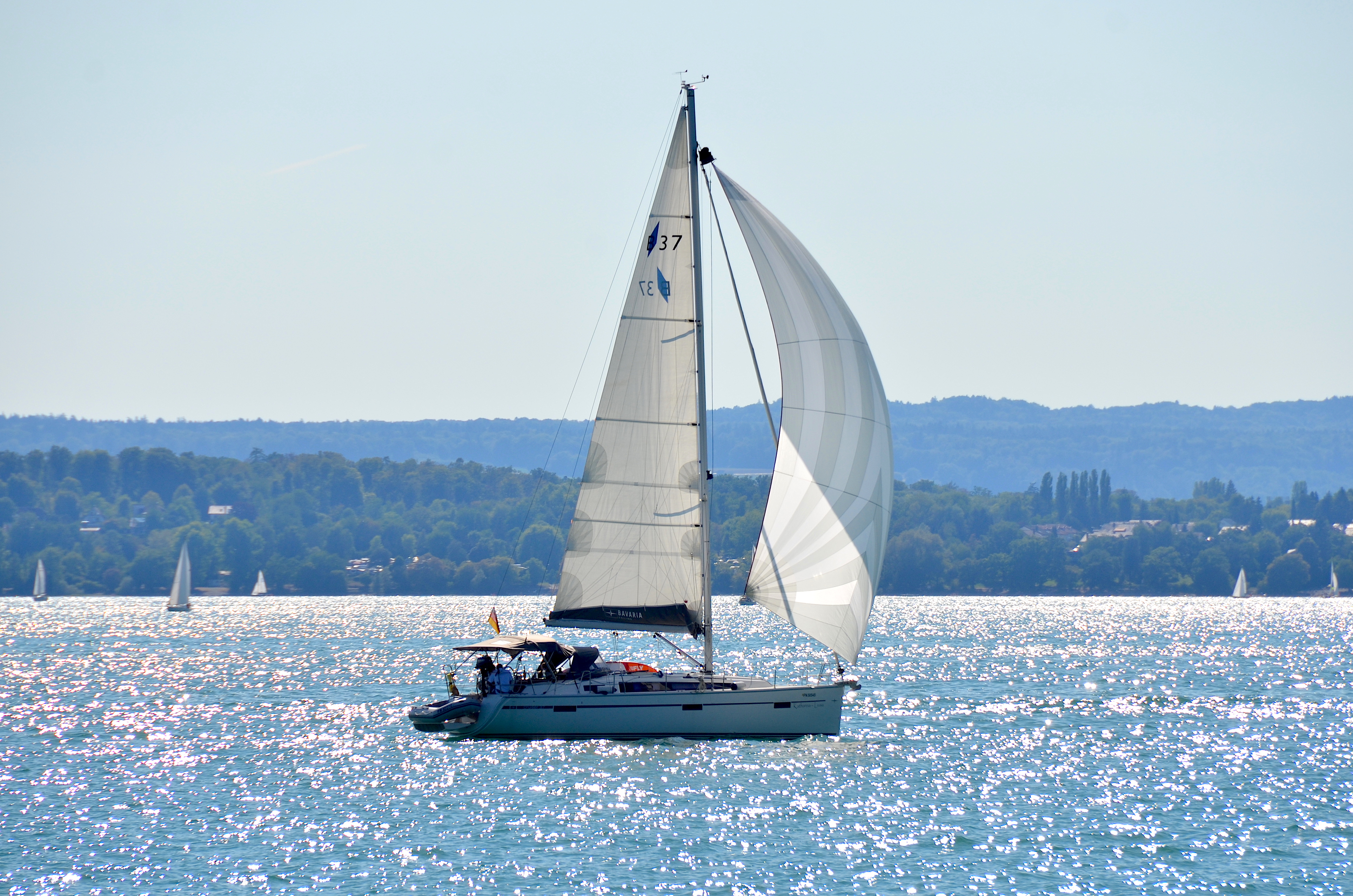
Bavaria Cruiser 37 at Lake Constance

In April 2013, Constantin von Bülow, a senior vice president of Oaktree Capital Management, became the new CEO of Bavaria. In July 2014 Bavaria Yachtbau bought the French catamaran producer Nautitech Catamarans. With this purchase, Bavaria Yachtbau has increased its product portfolio to include the growing catamaran sector.

On 7 January 2015 Lutz Henkel joined Bavaria Yachtbau as the new CEO. Lutz Henkel assumed his new responsibility on 1 February 2015 and replaced Constantin von Bülow, who became chairman of the board.

Today Bavaria Yachtbau GmbH has about 600 employees in Giebelstadt. 150 people work in the administration department. The yard in Giebelstadt is more than 656,000 square feet with approximately 230,000 square feet of production area.

On 20 April 2018 Boote Magazine was reporting that Bavaria has filed for bankruptcy - According to information available to the magazine investors have withdrawn their capital support.

On 16 September 2018, Capital Management-Partners GmbH (CMP) officially acquires Bavaria as a new financial investor. In April 2019, Dr. Tobias Brinkmann of Brinkmann & Partner, Hamburg, had appointed a new investor as insolvency administrator for Bavaria Yachtbau GmbH and Bavaria Catamarans Srl. (Rochefort, France). It was not until the last moment before the final closure of the shipyard that the purchase contract with CMP was signed on 17 September.

The new management team of the new Bavaria Yachtbau GmbH includes Michael Müller (CEO) and since August 2021 Marc Diening as CEO. In July 2025, the current COO is Norbert Leifeld and the CFO is Thorsten Gatz.

== Range ==
- Sailing yachts
  - BAVARIA C38 - 37.4 feet (11.4 m)
  - BAVARIA C42 - 40.6 feet (12.4 m)
  - BAVARIA C45 - 45.9 feet (14.0 m)
  - BAVARIA C50 - 49.2 feet (14.99 m)
  - BAVARIA C57 - 54.9 feet (16.7 m)
  - CRUISER 34 - 32.9 feet (10.0 m)
  - CRUISER 37 - 37.1 feet (11.3 m)
  - CRUISER 41 - 40.6 feet (12.4 m)
  - CRUISER 41S - 40.6 feet (12.4 m)
  - VISION 42 - 42 feet (13 m)
  - VISION 46 - 45.1 feet (13.7 m)
  - EASY 9.7 - 32.78 feet (9.99 m)
  - 1060
  - 960 - 32 feet (9.8 m)
  - 890
- Motorboats
  - BAVARIA R40 - 41.6 feet (12.7 m)
  - BAVARIA R55 - 58 feet (18 m)
  - BAVARIA S29 - 28.9 feet (8.8 m)
  - BAVARIA S30 - 28.9 feet (8.8 m)
  - BAVARIA S33 - 33 feet (10 m)
  - BAVARIA S36 - 35.5 feet (10.8 m)
  - BAVARIA S40 - 40.1 feet (12.2 m)
  - BAVARIA S45 - 45.4 feet (13.8 m)
  - VIRTESS 420 - 40.8 feet (12.4 m)
- Catamarans
  - NAUTITECH 40 OPEN - 39.3 feet (12.0 m)
  - NAUTITECH 46 OPEN | FLY - 45.2 feet (13.8 m)
  - NAUTITECH 47 POWER - 46.7 feet (14.2 m)
  - NAUTITECH 541 | 542 - 53.5 feet (16.3 m)
