= 2006 Russia–Georgia energy crisis =

The 2006 Russia–Georgia energy crisis describes an international incident triggered by two explosions on the Mozdok–Tbilisi natural gas pipeline in North Ossetia on January 22, 2006. The explosions suspended gas supply to Georgia at a time when the weather was particularly cold, leading to allegations of deliberate energy blackmail carried out by the Russian government.

== Background ==
The explosions took place with the backdrop of the 2006 Russia-Ukraine gas crisis that same month. They also coincided with sabotage on electricity lines just several miles from the pipeline, which descended large parts of Georgia into darkness. Due to these suspicious coincidences, Georgia accused Russia of conducting deliberate acts of sabotage with the aim of forcing the nation into surrendering its pipelines to Gazprom – the Russian state-owned monopoly.

Russia dismisses the accusations, claiming the charges could be set by terrorists. The pipelines were eventually fixed on 7 February 2006

== See also ==
- Energy policy of Russia
- Gazprom – Russian oil and gas company
- Rose Revolution – 2003 popular uprising in Georgia
- Russia-Ukraine gas dispute – Disputes between Naftogaz Ukrayiny and Gazprom
