= Terrorism Risk Insurance Act =

United States legislation enacted in 2002

- Other short titles: Terrorism Risk Insurance Act of 2002
- Long title: An Act to ensure the continued financial capacity of insurers to provide coverage for risks from terrorism.
- Acronyms (colloquial): TRIA, TRPA
- Nicknames: Terrorism Risk Protection Act
- Enacted by: the 107th United States Congress
- Effective: November 26, 2002

Citations
- Public law: 107-297
- Statutes at Large: 116 Stat. 2322

Codification
- Titles amended: 15 U.S.C.: Commerce and Trade; 28 U.S.C.: Judiciary and Judicial Procedure; 12 U.S.C.: Banks and Banking
- U.S.C. sections amended: 15 U.S.C. ch. 93 § 6701; 28 U.S.C. ch. 97 § 1610; 12 U.S.C. ch. 3 § 248

Legislative history
- Introduced in the House as H.R. 3210 by Michael Oxley (R-OH) on November 1, 2001; Committee consideration by House Financial Services, House Ways and Means, House Budget, House Judiciary; Passed the House on November 29, 2001 (227-193, Roll call vote 464, via Clerk.House.gov); Passed the Senate on July 25, 2002 (Passed unanimous consent); Reported by the joint conference committee on November 13, 2002; agreed to by the House on November 14, 2002 (Agreed voice vote) and by the Senate on November 19, 2002 (86-11, Roll call vote 252, via Senate.gov); Signed into law by President George W. Bush on November 26, 2002

United States Supreme Court cases
- Ministry of Defense and Support for Armed Forces of Islamic Republic of Iran v. Elahi, 556 U.S. 366 (2009); Bank Markazi v. Peterson, No. 14-770, 578 U.S. ___ (2016); Rubin v. Islamic Republic of Iran, No. 16-534, 583 U.S. ___ (2018)

The Terrorism Risk Insurance Act (TRIA) (H.R. 3210, Pub. L. 107–297 (text) (PDF)) is a United States federal law signed into law by President George W. Bush on November 26, 2002. The Act created a federal "backstop" for insurance claims related to acts of terrorism. The Act "provides for a transparent system of shared public and private compensation for insured losses resulting from acts of terrorism." The Act was originally set to expire December 31, 2005, was extended for two years in December 2005, and was extended again on December 26, 2007. The Terrorism Risk Insurance Program Reauthorization Act expired on December 31, 2014.

On January 7, 2015 the House of Representatives voted 416-5 to approve the Terrorism Risk Insurance Program Reauthorization Act of 2015, (H.R. 26, Pub. L. 114–1 (text) (PDF)) extending the TRIA through December 31, 2020. The Senate approved the extension the day after by a vote of 93-4. On January 12, 2015, President Barack Obama signed the extension into law.

On December 17, 2019 the House of Representatives voted 297-120 to approve the Further Consolidated Appropriations Act, 2020 (H.R. 1865, Pub. L. 116–94 (text) (PDF)) which included the Terrorism Risk Insurance Program Reauthorization Act of 2019 extending the TRIA through December 31, 2027. The Senate approved the extension on December 19, 2019 by a vote of 71-23. The following day, President Donald Trump signed the bill into law.

== History ==
Before the September 11 attacks, business insurers generally neither charged for nor specifically excluded terrorism coverage. The scope of the 9/11 attacks and the resulting $40 billion estimated insured loss changed perceptions dramatically. It was the worst terrorist attack on record for both property and fatalities and the worst international attack on American soil since the Japanese surprise attack on Pearl Harbor, as nearly 3,000 people lost their lives in New York City, Washington, D.C., and Stonycreek Township near Shanksville, Pennsylvania.

Much of the financial cost from the 9/11 attacks fell on reinsurers (that further spread the risk assumed by primary insurers). Unable to accurately model or price terrorism exposures, reinsurers largely withdrew from the market for terrorism coverage. Without reinsurance, primary insurers were then compelled to exclude terrorism. Most state insurance regulators approved terrorism exclusions for use by primary insurers.

Many businesses were not able to purchase insurance protection against future terrorist attacks. This situation was a serious threat to industries where lenders and investors required terrorism protection for their investments. Real estate, transportation, construction, energy, and utility sectors of the economy were vulnerable, creating broader threats to the national economy.

Congress responded by enacting TRIA in November 2002 to provide a government reinsurance backstop in case of large-scale terrorist attacks, requiring that business insurers offer terrorism coverage for the types of insurance included in the act. Congress extended and amended TRIA in December 2005 and December 2007.

Following enactment of the 2007 TRIA extension, the Congressional Budget Office forecast a net federal budget cost of $0 for TRIA through 2017. "Under TRIA, the federal government would help insurers cover losses in the event of a terrorist attack under certain conditions, and would also impose assessments on the insurance industry to recover all or a portion of the federal payments."

The act expired on December 31, 2014, but was renewed at the start of the next congress, with President Barack Obama signing the extension on January 12, 2015. Many experts warn that "construction projects could be stalled and commercial loans on shopping malls, utilities and skyscrapers could be in jeopardy." In addition, according to The Baltimore Sun, the National Football League denied rumors that it would cancel the Super Bowl over the issue.

The act was set to expire on December 31, 2019, but was renewed under the 116th Congress as part of an omnibus spending bill, with President Donald Trump signing the Further Consolidated Appropriations Act, 2020 on December 20, 2019. The Act includes the Terrorism Risk Insurance Program Reauthorization Act of 2019 which further extends the TRIPRA for an additional 7 years, expiring on December 31, 2027.

== Governance ==
The Secretary of the Treasury oversees the Terrorism Insurance Program, with the assistance of the Federal Insurance Office. The Secretary has authority to establish regulations and procedures to implement TRIA.

== Definition of terrorism ==
The term "act of terrorism" is defined in the act as: any act certified by the Secretary of the Treasury, in concurrence with the Secretary of Homeland Security and Attorney General, to be an act that is dangerous to human life, property, or infrastructure and to have resulted in damage within the U.S. (or outside the U.S. in the case of a U.S.-flagged vessel, aircraft or premises of a U.S. mission). It must be committed as part of an effort to coerce U.S. civilians or to influence either policy or conduct of the U.S. Government through coercion. The definition includes both foreign and domestic terrorists. The Secretary may not delegate this certification authority and his or her decision to either certify or not certify an act of terrorism is not subject to judicial review.

== Function ==
TRIA created a U.S. government reinsurance facility to provide reinsurance coverage to insurance companies following a declared terrorism event. TRIA is a short-term measure designed to help the insurance market recover from 9/11 and develop solutions to insuring terrorism.

TRIA established the Federal Terrorism Insurance Program to administer a system of shared public/private compensation for insured losses resulting from acts of terrorism in order to protect consumers and create transitional period for private insurance markets to stabilize

== Structure of assistance ==
- Eligibility of Insurers: An eligible insurer is any entity or affiliate that:

-Is a recipient of direct earned premiums for any type of commercial property and casualty insurance coverage;
-Is licensed (or admitted) to provide insurance in any State, approved for the purpose of offering property and casualty insurance by a Federal agency in connection with maritime, energy, or aviation activity, or is a State residual market insurance entity or State workers' compensation fund
-And meets any other criteria that the Secretary may reasonably prescribe.

- Program Trigger: Program is triggered following occurrence of event determined by Secretary of the Treasury, Secretary of Homeland Security, and the U.S. Attorney General to be act of terrorism. Losses from the act must exceed $50 million in 2006, $100 million in 2007, $120 million in 2016, $140 million in 2017, $160 million in 2018, $180 million in 2019, and $200 million with respect to losses occurring in calendar year 2020 and any calendar year thereafter (15 U.S.C. §6701 note, §103(e)(1)(B)).
- Individual Company Trigger (or Deductible): Trigger or deductible for individual company is 17.5 percent of premiums in 2006 and 20% in 2007.
- Industry-wide Retention: The industry as a whole must cover a certain amount of the losses before federal assistance is available. This amount rises from $15 billion in 2005 to $25 billion in 2006 and rises again in 2007 to $27.5 billion. The difference between this amount and the aggregate amount that insurers must pay (deductibles and co-payments) can be recouped from commercial policyholders through a surcharge not to exceed 3 percent of premium for insurance coverages that fall under the TRIEA program. This reinsurance takes the form of a 90 percent quota share in excess of variable deductibles based upon a percentage of earned premium income.
- Cap on Assistance: $100 billion per year.
- Post Trigger Federal Assistance: When program is triggered, Federal government is to pay 90% of insured terrorism losses in excess of individual insurer trigger/deductibles while the insurer pays 10%. In 2007, this rises to 85%/15%. In 2016, this 85% shall decrease by 1 percentage point per calendar year until equal to 80% (15 U.S.C. §6701 note, §103(e)(1)(A) of the Terrorism Risk Insurance Act of 2002 (15 U.S.C. 6701 note)).
- Recoupment of Assistance: Recoupment to be through surcharges of up to 3% of annual premiums on all policyholders. Mandatory recoupment for all amounts provided to insurers under industry-wide retention. No mandatory recoupment of uncompensated losses in excess of industry-wide retention. Secretary of the Treasury has discretion to recoup additional amounts.
- Covered Lines: Commercial, plus war coverage for workers' compensation; excludes reinsurance. Secretary of the Treasury has discretion to add group life insurance and other personal lines.
- Mandatory Terrorism Coverage: For the first two years, insurers must offer terrorism insurance in all commercial policies. Coverage must be available on terms identical to terms, amounts, and other coverage limitations applicable to losses incurred from events other than acts of terrorism.
- Application to State Residual Market Entities and State Workers Compensation Funds: Residual market entities and State funds are included in the insurers covered by the Act. The Act also applies to surplus lines carriers listed on the Quarterly Listing of Alien Insurers published by the National Association of Insurance Commissioners. In addition, captive insurers and other self-insurance arrangements such as workers compensation self-insurance programs and State workers compensation reinsurance pools are included.
- Cost Disclosure of Terrorism Coverage: Insurers must disclose terrorism insurance premiums and the existence of the federal backstop.
- Consultation with State Insurance Regulators (NAIC): As the Secretary of Treasury determines appropriate, concerning the Terrorism Insurance Program.
- State Regulation Uniformity: No stated uniformity.
- Civil Actions and Litigation: Federal cause of action in district court(s) designated by Judicial Panel on Multi-district Litigation with the substantive law of the state in which the act occurred applied.
- Legal Modifications and Limitations: Punitive damages do not constitute "insured losses" and thus no federal participation. U.S. right of subrogation.
- Reports from Insurers: No reports required, except for data not available to NAIC. Secretary of Treasury responsible for compiling of data.
- State Pre-emption: Applicable to terrorism definition and state prior approval rating statutes. Also applies to existing terrorism exclusions, with provisions for reinstatement under certain conditions. Access to books/records by Secretary of Treasury guaranteed.
- Civil Monetary Penalties: $100 million against insurers for failing to pay assessments or surcharges, erroneous data, or violation of regulations.
- Report to Congress: Secretary of the Treasury, in consultation with NAIC, the insurance industry and other experts, is to issue a report not later than June 30, 2005, covering required items.
- Satisfaction of Judgments from Assets of Terrorists: No.

== See also ==
- Pool Re
