= Insurance =

Protection from financial loss

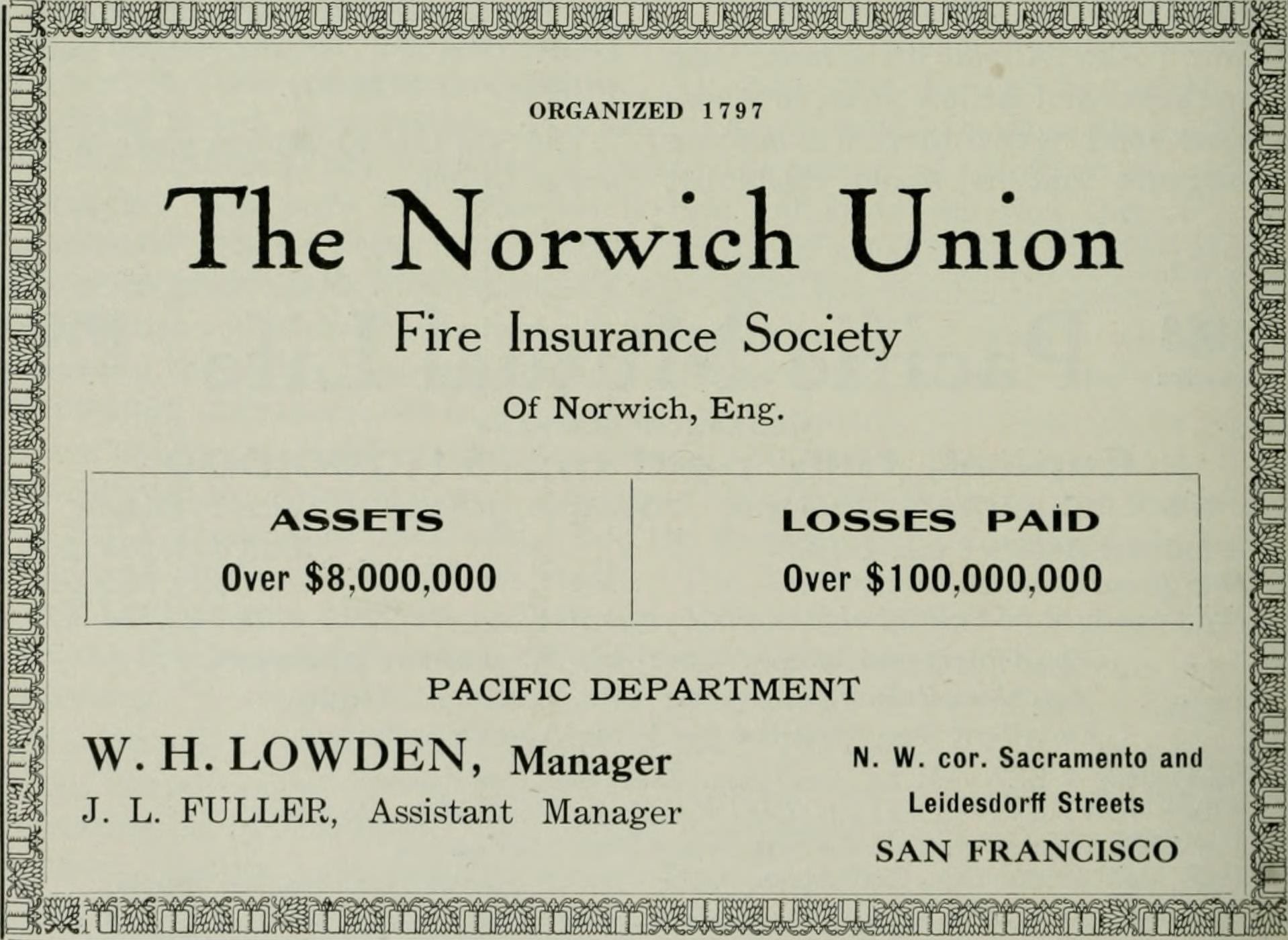
An advertisement for a fire insurance company Norwich Union, showing the amount of assets in coverage and paid insurance (1910)

Insurance is a means of protection from financial loss in which, in exchange for a fee, a party agrees to compensate another party in the event of a certain loss, damage, or injury. It is a form of risk management, primarily used to protect against the risk of a contingent or uncertain loss.

An entity which provides insurance is known as an insurer, insurance company, insurance carrier, or underwriter. A person or entity who buys insurance is known as a policyholder, while a person or entity covered under the policy is called an insured. The insurance transaction involves the policyholder assuming a guaranteed, known, and relatively small loss in the form of a payment to the insurer (a premium) in exchange for the insurer's promise to compensate the insured in the event of a covered loss. The loss may or may not be financial, but it must always be reducible to financial terms. Furthermore, it usually involves something in which the insured has an insurable interest established by ownership, possession, or pre-existing relationship.

The insured receives a contract, called the insurance policy, which details the conditions and circumstances under which the insurer will compensate the insured, or their designated beneficiary or assignee. The amount of money charged by the insurer to the policyholder for the coverage set forth in the insurance policy is called the premium. If the insured experiences a loss which is potentially covered by the insurance policy, the insured submits a claim to the insurer for processing by a claims adjuster. A mandatory out-of-pocket expense required by an insurance policy before an insurer will pay a claim is called a deductible or excess (or if required by a health insurance policy, a copayment). The insurer may mitigate its own risk by taking out reinsurance, whereby another insurance company agrees to carry some of the risks, especially if the primary insurer deems the risk too large for it to carry.

== History ==
=== Early methods ===
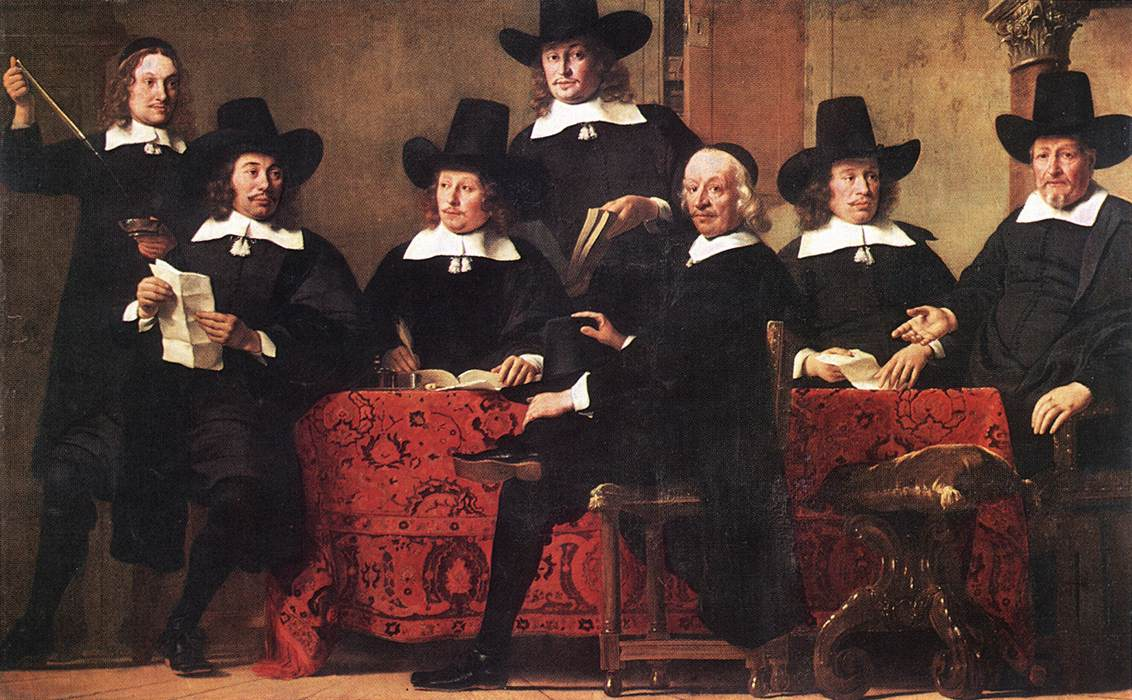
Merchants have sought methods to minimize risks since early times. Pictured, Governors of the Wine Merchant's Guild by Ferdinand Bol, c. 1680.

Methods for transferring or distributing risk were practiced by Chinese and Indian traders as long ago as the 3rd and 2nd millennia BC, respectively. Chinese merchants travelling treacherous river rapids would redistribute their wares across many vessels to limit the loss due to any single vessel capsizing.

Codex Hammurabi Law 238 (c. 1755–1750 BC) stipulated that a sea captain, ship-manager, or ship charterer who saved a ship from total loss was only required to pay one-half the value of the ship to the ship-owner. In the Digesta seu Pandectae (533), the second volume of the codification of laws ordered by Justinian I (527–565), a legal opinion written by the Roman jurist Paulus in 235 AD was included about the Lex Rhodia ("Rhodian law"). It articulates the general average principle of marine insurance established on the island of Rhodes in approximately 1000 to 800 BC, plausibly by the Phoenicians during the proposed Dorian invasion and emergence of the purported Sea Peoples during the Greek Dark Ages (c. 1100–c. 750).

The law of general average is the fundamental principle that underlies all insurance. In 1816, an archeological excavation in Minya, Egypt produced a Nerva–Antonine dynasty-era tablet from the ruins of the Temple of Antinous in Antinoöpolis, Aegyptus. The tablet prescribed the rules and membership dues of a burial society collegium established in Lanuvium, Italia in approximately 133 AD during the reign of Hadrian (117–138) of the Roman Empire. In 1851 AD, future U.S. Supreme Court Associate Justice Joseph P. Bradley (1870–1892 AD), once employed as an actuary for the Mutual Benefit Life Insurance Company, submitted an article to the Journal of the Institute of Actuaries. His article detailed an historical account of a Severan dynasty-era life table compiled by the Roman jurist Ulpian in approximately 220 AD that was also included in the Digesta.

Concepts of insurance have also been found in 3rd century BC Hindu scriptures such as Dharmasastra, Arthashastra and Manusmriti. The ancient Greeks had marine loans. Money was advanced on a ship or cargo, to be repaid with large interest if the voyage prospers. However, the money would not be repaid at all if the ship were lost, thus making the rate of interest high enough to pay for not only for the use of the capital but also for the risk of losing it (fully described by Demosthenes). Loans of this character have ever since been common in maritime lands under the name of bottomry and respondentia bonds.

The direct insurance of sea-risks for a premium paid independently of loans began in Belgium about 1300 AD.

Separate insurance contracts (i.e., insurance policies not bundled with loans or other kinds of contracts) were invented in Genoa in the 14th century, as were insurance pools backed by pledges of landed estates. The first known insurance contract dates from Genoa in 1347. In the next century, maritime insurance developed widely, and premiums were varied with risks. These new insurance contracts allowed insurance to be separated from investment, a separation of roles that first proved useful in marine insurance.

The earliest known policy of life insurance was made in the Royal Exchange, London, on 18 June 1583, for £383, 6s. 8d. for twelve months on the life of William Gibbons.

=== Modern methods ===
Insurance became far more sophisticated in Enlightenment-era Europe, where specialized varieties developed.

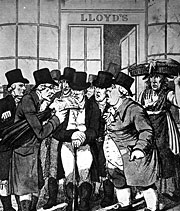
Lloyd's Coffee House was the first organized market for marine insurance.

Property insurance can be traced to the Great Fire of London, which in 1666 devoured more than 13,000 houses. The devastating effects of the fire converted the development of insurance "from a matter of convenience into one of urgency, a change of opinion reflected in Sir Christopher Wren's inclusion of a site for 'the Insurance Office' in his new plan for London in 1667". A number of attempted fire insurance schemes came to nothing, but in 1681, economist Nicholas Barbon and eleven associates established the first fire insurance company, the "Insurance Office for Houses", at the back of the Royal Exchange to insure brick and frame homes. Initially, 5,000 homes were insured by his Insurance Office.

At the same time, the first insurance schemes for the underwriting of business ventures became available. By the end of the seventeenth century, London's growth as a centre for trade was increasing due to the demand for marine insurance. In the late 1680s, Edward Lloyd opened a coffee house, which became the meeting place for parties in the shipping industry wishing to insure cargoes and ships, including those willing to underwrite such ventures. These informal beginnings led to the establishment of the insurance market Lloyd's of London and several related shipping and insurance businesses.

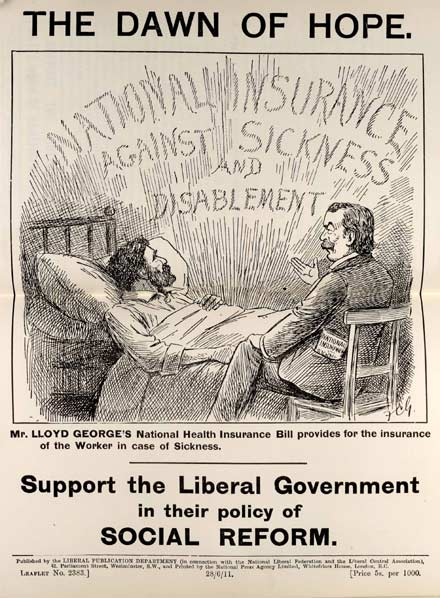
Leaflet promoting the National Insurance Act 1911

Life insurance policies were taken out in the early 18th century. The first company to offer life insurance was the Amicable Society for a Perpetual Assurance Office, founded in London in 1706 by William Talbot and Sir Thomas Allen. Upon the same principle, Edward Rowe Mores established the Society for Equitable Assurances on Lives and Survivorship in 1762.

It was the world's first mutual insurer and it pioneered age-based premiums based on mortality rate laying "the framework for scientific insurance practice and development" and "the basis of modern life assurance upon which all life assurance schemes were subsequently based".

In the late 19th century "accident insurance" began to become available. The first company to offer accident insurance was the Railway Passengers Assurance Company, formed in 1848 in England to insure against the rising number of fatalities on the nascent railway system.

The first international insurance rule was the York Antwerp Rules (YAR) for the distribution of costs between ship and cargo in the event of general average. In 1873 the "Association for the Reform and Codification of the Law of Nations", the forerunner of the International Law Association (ILA), was founded in Brussels. It published the first YAR in 1890, before switching to the present title of the "International Law Association" in 1895.

By the late 19th century governments began to initiate national insurance programs against sickness and old age. Germany built on a tradition of welfare programs in Prussia and Saxony that began as early as in the 1840s. In the 1880s Chancellor Otto von Bismarck introduced old age pensions, accident insurance and medical care that formed the basis for Germany's welfare state. In Britain more extensive legislation was introduced by the Liberal government in the National Insurance Act 1911. This gave the British working classes the first contributory system of insurance against illness and unemployment. This system was greatly expanded after the Second World War under the influence of the Beveridge Report, to form the first modern welfare state.

In 2008, the International Network of Insurance Associations (INIA), then an informal network, became active and it has been succeeded by the Global Federation of Insurance Associations (GFIA), which was formally founded in 2012 to increase insurance industry effectiveness in providing input to international regulatory bodies and to contribute more effectively to the international dialogue on issues of common interest. It consists of 40 member associations and 1 observer association in 67 countries, which companies account for around 89% of total insurance premiums worldwide.

== Principles ==
Insurance involves pooling funds from many insured entities to pay for the losses that some may incur, a process known as risk pool. The insured entities are therefore protected from risk for a fee, with the fee being dependent upon the frequency and severity of the event occurring. In order to be an insurable risk, the risk insured against must meet certain characteristics. Insurance as a financial intermediary is a commercial enterprise and a major part of the financial services industry, but individual entities can also self-insure through saving money for possible future losses.

=== Insurability ===
Risk which can be insured by private companies typically share seven common characteristics:

1. A large number of similar exposure units: Since insurance operates through pooling resources, the majority of insurance policies cover individual members of large classes, allowing insurers to benefit from the law of large numbers in which predicted losses are similar to the actual losses. Exceptions include Lloyd's of London, which is famous for insuring the life or health of actors, sports figures, and other famous individuals. However, all exposures will have distinct differences, which may lead to different premium rates.
2. Definite loss: This type of loss takes place at a known time and place from a known cause. The classic example involves the death of an insured person on a life insurance policy. Fire, automobile accidents, and worker injuries may all easily meet this criterion. Other types of losses may only be definite in theory. Occupational disease, for instance, may involve prolonged exposure to injurious conditions where no specific time, place, or cause is identifiable. Ideally, the time, place, and cause of a loss should be clear enough that a reasonable person, with sufficient information, could objectively verify all three elements.
3. Accidental loss: The event that constitutes the trigger of a claim should be fortuitous, or at least outside the control of the beneficiary of the insurance. The loss should be pure because it results from an event for which there is only the opportunity for cost. Events that contain speculative elements such as ordinary business risks or even purchasing a lottery ticket are generally not considered insurable.
4. Large loss: The size of the loss must be meaningful from the perspective of the insured. Insurance premiums need to cover both the expected cost of losses, plus the cost of issuing and administering the policy, adjusting losses, and supplying the capital needed to reasonably assure that the insurer will be able to pay claims. For small losses, these latter costs may be several times the size of the expected cost of losses. There is hardly any point in paying such costs unless the protection offered has real value to a buyer.
5. Affordable premium: If the likelihood of an insured event is so high, or the cost of the event so large, that the resulting premium is large relative to the amount of protection offered, then it is not likely that insurance will be purchased, even if on offer. Furthermore, as the accounting profession formally recognizes in financial accounting standards, the premium cannot be so large that there is not a reasonable chance of a significant loss to the insurer. Suppose there is no such chance of loss. In that case, the transaction may have the form of insurance, but not the substance (see the U.S. Financial Accounting Standards Board pronouncement number 113: "Accounting and Reporting for Reinsurance of Short-Duration and Long-Duration Contracts").
6. Calculable loss: There are two elements that must be at least estimable, if not formally calculable: the probability of loss and the attendant cost. Probability of loss is generally an empirical exercise, while cost has more to do with the ability of a reasonable person in possession of a copy of the insurance policy and a proof of loss associated with a claim presented under that policy to make a reasonably definite and objective evaluation of the amount of the loss recoverable as a result of the claim.
7. Limited risk of catastrophically large losses: Insurable losses are ideally independent and non-catastrophic, meaning that the losses do not happen all at once and that individual losses are not severe enough to bankrupt the insurer; insurers may prefer to limit their exposure to a loss from a single event to some small portion of their capital base. Capital constrains insurers' ability to sell earthquake insurance as well as wind insurance in hurricane zones. In the United States, the federal government insures flood risk in specifically identified areas. In commercial fire insurance, it is possible to find single properties whose total exposed value is well in excess of any individual insurer's capital constraint. Such properties are generally shared among several insurers or are insured by a single insurer which syndicates the risk into the reinsurance market.

=== Legal ===
When a company insures an individual entity, there are basic legal requirements and regulations. Several commonly cited legal principles of insurance include the following:

1. Indemnity – the insurance company indemnifies or compensates the insured in the case of certain losses only up to the insured's interest.
2. Benefit insurance – as it is stated in the study books of The Chartered Insurance Institute, the insurance company does not have the right of recovery from the party who caused the injury and must compensate the insured regardless of the fact that Insured had already sued the negligent party for the damages (for example, personal accident insurance)
3. Insurable interest – the insured typically must directly suffer from the loss. Insurable interest must exist whether property insurance or insurance on a person is involved. The concept requires that the insured have a "stake" in the loss or damage to the life or property insured. What that "stake" is will be determined by the kind of insurance involved and the nature of the property ownership or relationship between the persons. The requirement of an insurable interest is what distinguishes insurance from gambling.
4. Utmost good faith (Uberrima fides) – the insured and the insurer are bound by a good faith bond of honesty and fairness. Material facts must be disclosed.
5. Contribution – insurers, which have similar obligations to the insured, contribute in the indemnification, according to some method.
6. Subrogation – the insurance company acquires legal rights to pursue recoveries on behalf of the insured; for example, the insurer may sue those liable for the insured's loss. The insurers can waive their subrogation rights by using the special clauses.
7. Causa proxima, or proximate cause – the cause of loss (the peril) must be covered under the insuring agreement of the policy, and the dominant cause must not be excluded.
8. Mitigation – In case of any loss or casualty, the asset owner must attempt to keep loss to a minimum, as if the asset were not insured.

=== Indemnification ===
To "indemnify" means to make whole again, or to be reinstated to the position that one was in, to the extent possible, prior to the happening of a specified event or peril. Accordingly, life insurance is generally not considered to be indemnity insurance, but rather "contingent" insurance (i.e., a claim arises on the occurrence of a specified event). There are generally three types of insurance contracts that seek to indemnify an insured:

1. A "reimbursement" policy
2. A "pay on behalf" or "on behalf of" policy"
3. An "indemnification" policy

From an insured's standpoint, the result is usually the same: the insurer pays the loss and claims expenses.

If the Insured has a "reimbursement" policy, the insured can be required to pay for a loss and then be "reimbursed" by the insurance carrier for the loss and out-of-pocket costs including, with the permission of the insurer, claim expenses. (Note: However, the bankruptcy of the insured with a "reimbursement" policy does not relieve the insurer. Certain types of insurance, e.g., workers' compensation and personal automobile liability, are subject to statutory requirements that injured parties have direct access to coverage.)

Under a "pay on behalf" policy, the insurance carrier would defend and pay a claim on behalf of the insured who would not be out of pocket for anything. Most modern liability insurance is written on the basis of "pay on behalf" language, which enables the insurance carrier to manage and control the claim.

Under an "indemnification" policy, the insurance carrier can generally either "reimburse" or "pay on behalf of", whichever is more beneficial to it and the insured in the claim handling process.

An entity seeking to transfer risk (an individual, corporation, or association of any type, etc.) becomes the "insured" party once risk is assumed by an "insurer", the insuring party, by means of a contract, called an insurance policy. Generally, an insurance contract includes, at a minimum, the following elements: identification of participating parties (the insurer, the insured, the beneficiaries), the premium, the period of coverage, the particular loss event covered, the amount of coverage (i.e., the amount to be paid to the insured or beneficiary in the event of a loss), and exclusions (events not covered). An insured is thus said to be "indemnified" against the loss covered in the policy.

When insured parties experience a loss for a specified peril, the coverage entitles the policyholder to make a claim against the insurer for the covered amount of loss as specified by the policy. The fee paid by the insured to the insurer for assuming the risk is called the premium. Insurance premiums from many insureds are used to fund accounts reserved for later payment of claims—in theory for a relatively few claimants—and for overhead costs. So long as an insurer maintains adequate funds set aside for anticipated losses (called reserves), the remaining margin is an insurer's profit.

=== Exclusions ===
Policies typically include a number of exclusions, for example:

- Nuclear exclusion clause, excluding damage caused by nuclear and radiation accidents
- War exclusion clause, excluding damage from acts of war or terrorism.

Insurers may prohibit certain activities that are considered dangerous and therefore excluded from coverage. One system for classifying activities according to whether they are authorised by insurers refers to three types of activities and events:

- green light – approved
- yellow light – require insurer consultation and/or waivers of liability
- red light – prohibited and outside the scope of insurance cover

== Social effects ==
Insurance can have various effects on society through the way that it changes who bears the cost of losses and damage. On one hand it can increase fraud; on the other it can help societies and individuals prepare for catastrophes and mitigate the effects of catastrophes on both households and societies.

Insurance can influence the probability of losses through moral hazard, insurance fraud, and preventive steps by the insurance company. Insurance scholars have typically used moral hazard to refer to the increased loss due to unintentional carelessness and insurance fraud to refer to increased risk due to intentional carelessness or indifference. Insurers attempt to address carelessness through inspections, policy provisions requiring certain types of maintenance, and possible discounts for loss mitigation efforts. While in theory insurers could encourage investment in loss reduction, some commentators have argued that in practice insurers had historically not aggressively pursued loss control measures—particularly to prevent disaster losses such as hurricanes—because of concerns over rate reductions and legal battles. However, since about 1996 insurers have begun to take a more active role in loss mitigation, such as through building codes.

=== Methods of insurance ===
According to the study books of The Chartered Insurance Institute, there are variant methods of insurance as follows:

1. Co-insurance – risks shared between insurers (sometimes referred to as "Retention")
2. Dual insurance – having two or more policies with overlapping coverage of a risk (both the individual policies would not pay separately—under a concept named contribution, they would contribute together to make up the policyholder's losses. However, in case of contingency insurances such as life insurance, dual payment is allowed)
3. Self-insurance – situations where risk is not transferred to insurance companies and solely retained by the entities or individuals themselves
4. Reinsurance – situations when the insurer passes some part of or all risks to another Insurer, called the reinsurer

== Insurers' business model ==
Accidents will happen (William H. Watson, 1922) is a slapstick silent film about the methods and mishaps of an insurance broker. Collection EYE Film Institute Netherlands.

Insurers may use the subscription business model, collecting premium payments periodically in return for on-going and/or compounding benefits offered to policyholders.

=== Insurance premium ===
The insurers' business model aims to collect more in insurance premiums than is paid out in losses, and to also offer a competitive price which consumers will accept. Insurance premiums can be simplified as:

insurance premium = expected value of claims + underwriting expenses + operating expense + profit − return on investment.

At the most basic level, insurance premium estimation involves looking at the frequency of claims, and the expected value of the payout for these claims. The most complicated aspect of insuring is the actuarial science of ratemaking (price-setting) of policies, which uses statistics and probability to approximate the rate of future claims based on a given risk. After producing rates, the insurer will use discretion to reject or accept risks through the underwriting process. The insurance company will collect historical loss-data, bring the loss data to present value, and compare these prior losses to the premium collected in order to assess rate adequacy. Loss ratios and expense loads are also used. Rating for different risk characteristics involves, at the most basic level, comparing the losses with "loss relativities"—a policy with twice as many losses would, therefore, be charged twice as much. More complex multivariate analyses are sometimes used when multiple characteristics are involved and a univariate analysis could produce confounded results. Other statistical methods may be used in assessing the probability of future losses.

Upon termination of a given policy, the amount of premium collected minus the amount paid out in claims is the insurer's underwriting profit on that policy. Underwriting performance is measured by something called the "combined ratio", which is the ratio of expenses/losses to premiums. A combined ratio of less than 100% indicates an underwriting profit, while anything over 100 indicates an underwriting loss.

Insurers make money in two ways:

- Through underwriting, the process by which insurers select the risks to insure and decide how much in insurance premiums to charge for accepting those risks, and taking the brunt of the risk should it come to pass.
- By investing the insurance premiums they collect from insured parties

A company with a combined ratio over 100% may nevertheless remain profitable due to investment earnings. Insurance companies earn investment profits on "float". Float, or available reserve, is the amount of money on hand at any given moment that an insurer has collected in insurance premiums but has not paid out in claims. Insurers start investing insurance premiums as soon as they are collected and continue to earn interest or other income on them until claims are paid out. The Association of British Insurers (grouping together 400 insurance companies and 94% of UK insurance services) has almost 20% of the investments in the London Stock Exchange. In 2007, U.S. industry profits from float totaled $58 billion. In a 2009 letter to investors, Warren Buffett wrote, "we were paid $2.8 billion to hold our float in 2008".

In the United States, the underwriting loss of property and casualty insurance companies was $142.3 billion in the five years ending 2003. But overall profit for the same period was $68.4 billion, as the result of float. Some insurance-industry insiders, most notably Hank Greenberg, do not believe that it is possible to sustain a profit from float forever without an underwriting profit as well, but this opinion is not universally held. Reliance on float for profit has led some industry experts to call insurance companies "investment companies that raise the money for their investments by selling insurance".

Naturally, the float method is difficult to carry out in an economically depressed period generally causing insurers to shift away from investments and to toughen up their underwriting standards, so a poor economy generally means high insurance-premiums. This tendency to swing between profitable and unprofitable periods over time is commonly known as the underwriting or insurance cycle.

When the insurance is required to pay for uninsured people the premia increase.

=== Claims ===
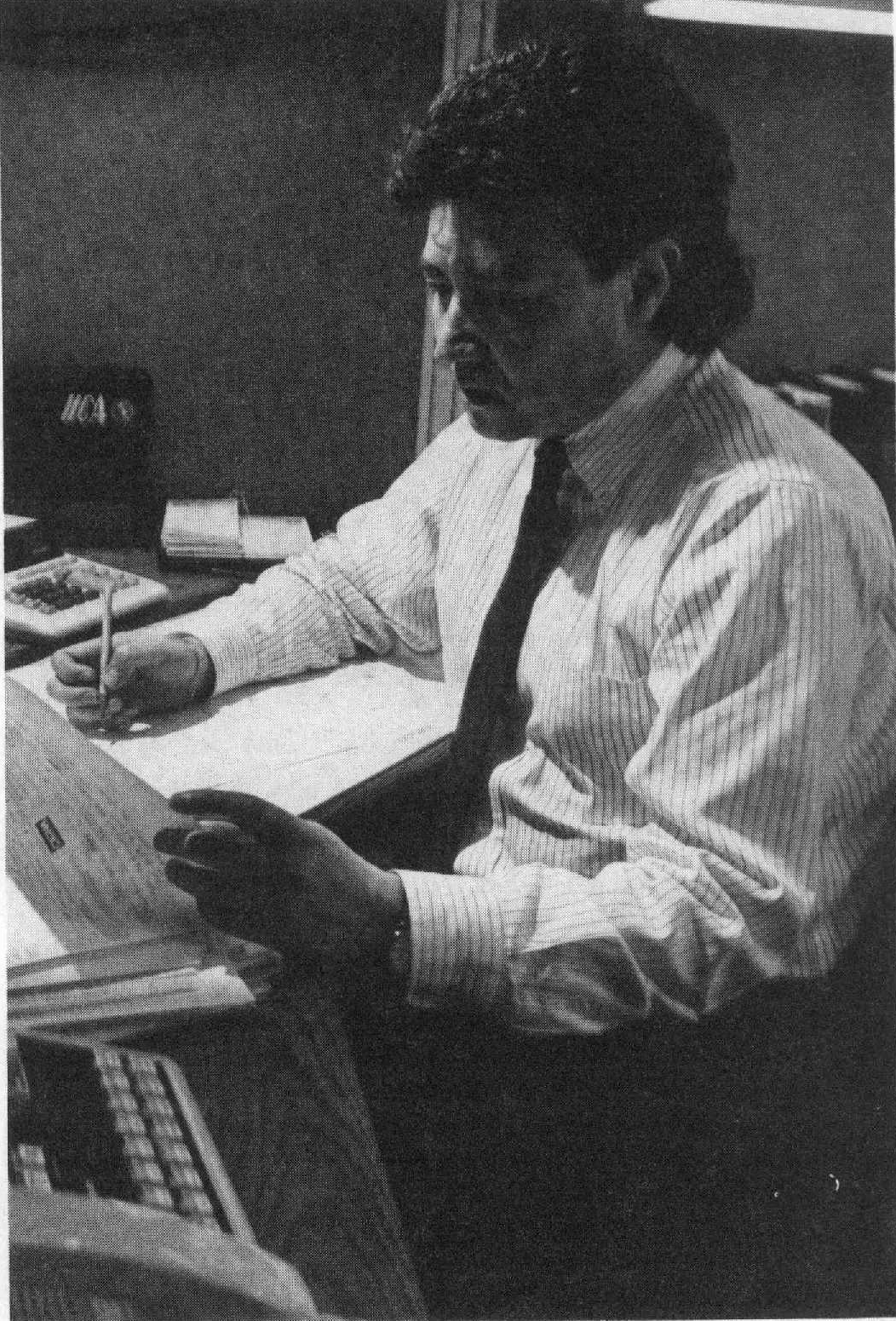
Claims examiner at work. (1992)

Claims and loss handling is the materialized utility of insurance; it is the actual "product" paid for. Claims may be filed by insureds directly with the insurer or through brokers or agents. The insurer may require that the claim be filed on its own proprietary forms, or may accept claims on a standard industry form, such as those produced by ACORD.

Insurance company claims departments employ a large number of claims adjusters, supported by a staff of records management and data entry clerks. Incoming claims are classified based on severity and are assigned to adjusters, whose settlement authority varies with their knowledge and experience. An adjuster undertakes an investigation of each claim, usually in close cooperation with the insured, determines if coverage is available under the terms of the insurance contract (and if so, the reasonable monetary value of the claim), and authorizes payment.

Policyholders may hire their own public adjusters to negotiate settlements with the insurance company on their behalf. For policies that are complicated, where claims may be complex, the insured may take out a separate insurance policy add-on, called loss recovery insurance, which covers the cost of a public adjuster in the case of a claim.

Adjusting liability insurance claims is particularly difficult because they involve a third party, the plaintiff, who is under no contractual obligation to cooperate with the insurer and may in fact regard the insurer as a deep pocket. The adjuster must obtain legal counsel for the insured—either inside ("house") counsel or outside ("panel") counsel, monitor litigation that may take years to complete, and appear in person or over the telephone with settlement authority at a mandatory settlement conference when requested by a judge.

If a claims adjuster suspects underinsurance, the condition of average may come into play to limit the insurance company's exposure.

In managing the claims-handling function, insurers seek to balance the elements of customer satisfaction, administrative handling expenses, and claims overpayment leakages. In addition to this balancing act, fraudulent insurance practices are a major business risk that insurers must manage and overcome. Disputes between insurers and insureds over the validity of claims or claims-handling practices occasionally escalate into litigation (see insurance bad faith).

=== Marketing ===
Insurers will often use insurance agents to initially market or underwrite their customers. Agents can be captive, meaning they write only for one company, or independent, meaning that they can issue policies from several companies. The existence and success of companies using insurance agents is likely due to the availability of improved and personalised services. Companies also use Broking firms, Banks and other corporate entities (like Self Help Groups, Microfinance Institutions, NGOs, etc.) to market their products.

== Types ==
Any risk that can be quantified can potentially be insured. Specific kinds of risk that may give rise to claims are known as perils. An insurance policy will set out in detail which perils are covered by the policy and which are not. Below are non-exhaustive lists of the many different types of insurance that exist. A single policy may cover risks in one or more of the categories set out below. For example, vehicle insurance would typically cover both the property risk (theft or damage to the vehicle) and the liability risk (legal claims arising from an accident). A home insurance policy in the United States typically includes coverage for damage to the home and the owner's belongings, certain legal claims against the owner, and even a small amount of coverage for medical expenses of guests who are injured on the owner's property.

Business insurance can take a number of different forms, such as the various kinds of professional liability insurance, also called professional indemnity (PI), which are discussed below under that name; and the business owner's policy (BOP), which packages into one policy many of the kinds of coverage that a business owner needs, in a way analogous to how homeowners' insurance packages the coverages that a homeowner needs.

=== Vehicle insurance ===
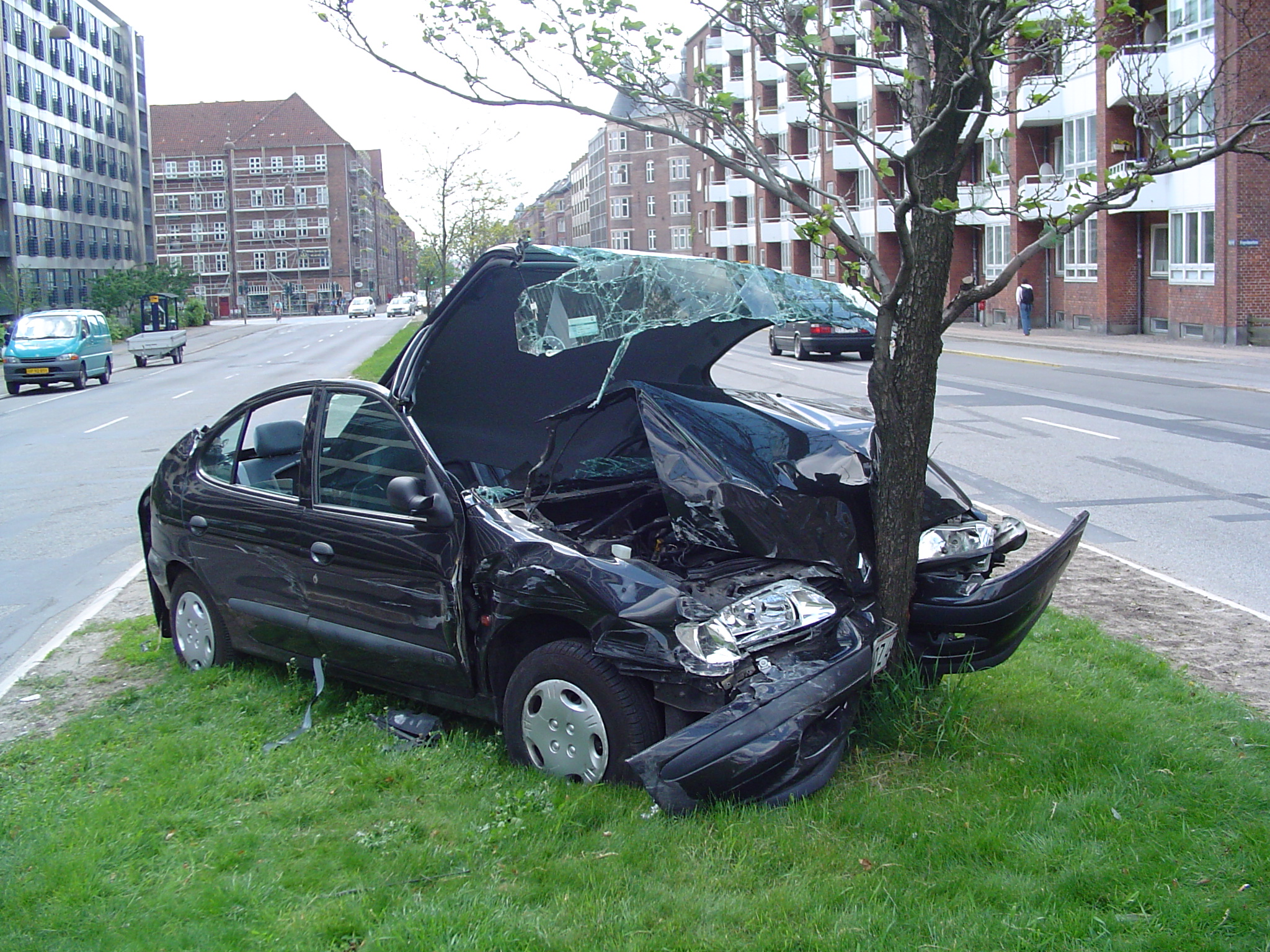
A wrecked vehicle in Copenhagen

Vehicle insurance protects the policyholder against financial loss in the event of an incident involving a vehicle they own, such as in a traffic collision.

Coverage typically includes:

- Property coverage, for damage to or theft of the car
- Liability coverage, for the legal responsibility to others for bodily injury or property damage
- Medical coverage, for the cost of treating injuries, rehabilitation and sometimes lost wages and funeral expenses

==== GAP insurance ====
GAP (Guaranteed Asset Protection) insurance covers the excess amount on an auto loan in an instance where the policyholder's insurance company does not cover the entire loan. Depending on the company's specific policies it might or might not cover the deductible as well. This coverage is marketed for those who put low down payments, have high interest rates on their loans, and those with 60-month or longer terms. Gap insurance is typically offered by a finance company when the vehicle owner purchases their vehicle, but many auto insurance companies offer this coverage to consumers as well.

=== Health insurance ===
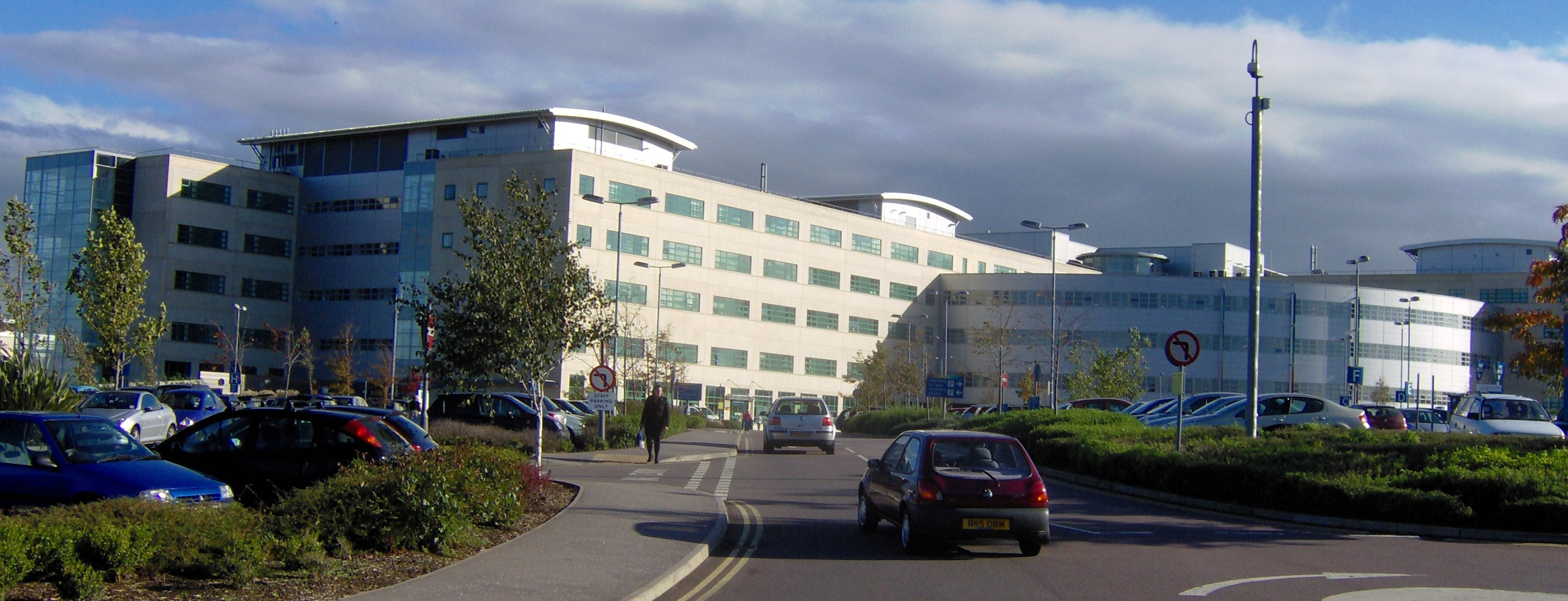
Great Western Hospital, Swindon

Health insurance policies cover the cost of medical treatments. Dental insurance, like medical insurance, protects policyholders for dental costs. In most developed countries, all citizens receive some health coverage from their governments, paid through taxation. In most countries, health insurance is often part of an employer's benefits.

=== Income protection insurance ===
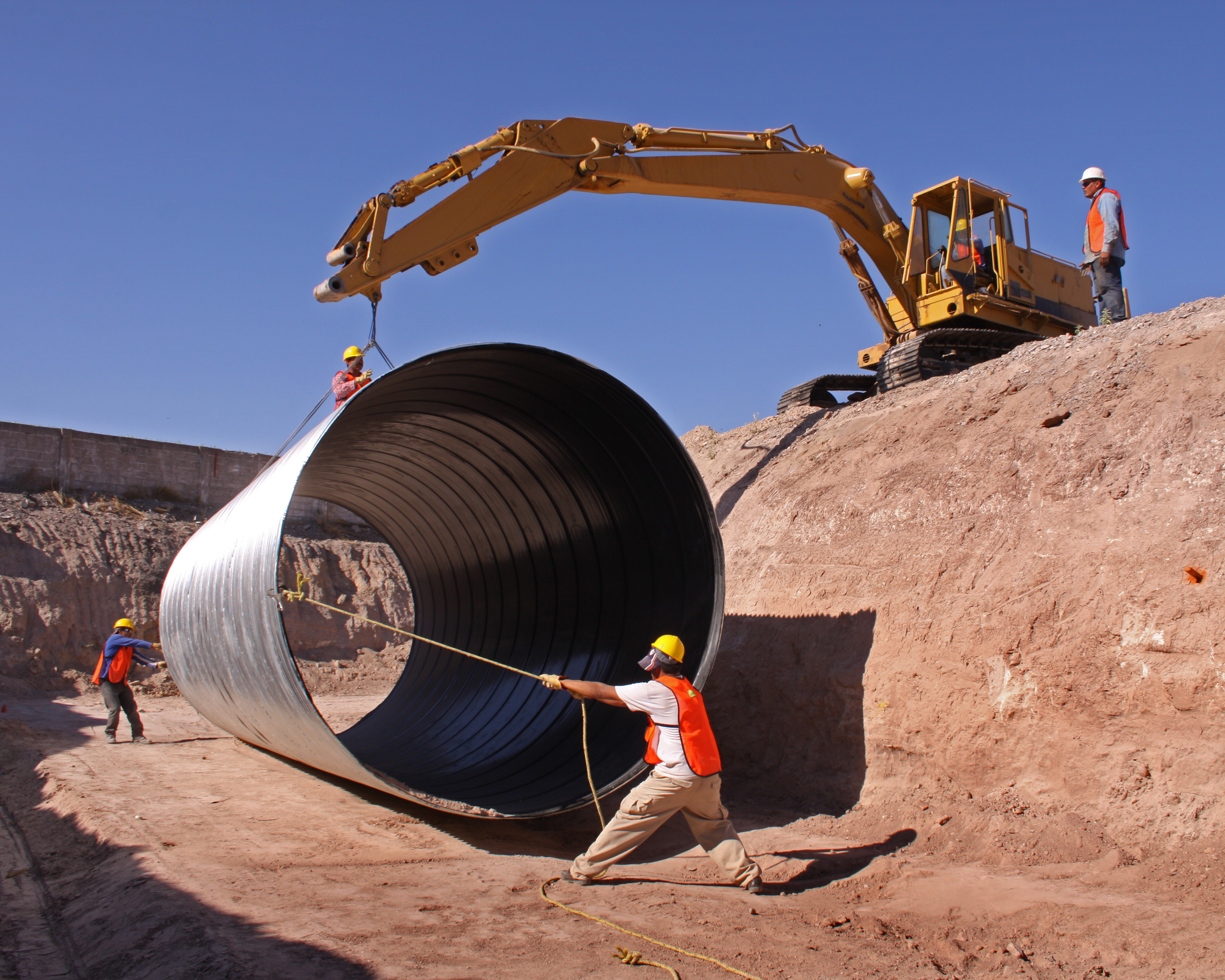
Workers' compensation, or employers' liability insurance, is compulsory in some countries.

- Disability insurance policies provide financial support in the event of the policyholder becoming unable to work because of disabling illness or injury. It provides monthly support to help pay such obligations as mortgage loans and credit cards. Short-term and long-term disability policies are available to individuals, but considering the expense, long-term policies are generally obtained only by those with at least six-figure incomes, such as doctors, lawyers, etc. Short-term disability insurance covers a person for a period typically up to six months, paying a stipend each month to cover medical bills and other necessities.
- Long-term disability insurance covers an individual's expenses for the long term, up until such time as they are considered permanently disabled and thereafter insurance companies will often try to encourage the person back into employment in preference to and before declaring them unable to work at all and therefore totally disabled.
- Disability overhead insurance allows business owners to cover the overhead expenses of their business while they are unable to work.
- Total permanent disability insurance provides benefits when a person is permanently disabled and can no longer work in their profession, often taken as an adjunct to life insurance.
- Workers' compensation insurance replaces all or part of a worker's wages lost and accompanying medical expenses incurred because of a job-related injury.

=== Casualty insurance ===
Casualty insurance insures against accidents, not necessarily tied to any specific property. It is a broad spectrum of insurance that a number of other types of insurance could be classified into, such as auto, workers compensation, and some liability insurances.

- Crime insurance is a form of casualty insurance that covers the policyholder against losses arising from the criminal acts of third parties. For example, a company can obtain crime insurance to cover losses arising from theft or embezzlement.
- Terrorism insurance provides protection against any loss or damage caused by terrorist activities. In the United States in the wake of 9/11, the Terrorism Risk Insurance Act 2002 (TRIA) set up a federal program providing a transparent system of shared public and private compensation for insured losses resulting from acts of terrorism. The program was extended until the end of 2014 by the Terrorism Risk Insurance Program Reauthorization Act 2007 (TRIPRA).
- Kidnap and ransom insurance is designed to protect individuals and corporations operating in high-risk areas around the world against the perils of kidnap, extortion, wrongful detention and hijacking.
- Political risk insurance is a form of casualty insurance that can be taken out by businesses with operations in countries in which there is a risk that revolution or other political conditions could result in a loss.

=== Life insurance ===
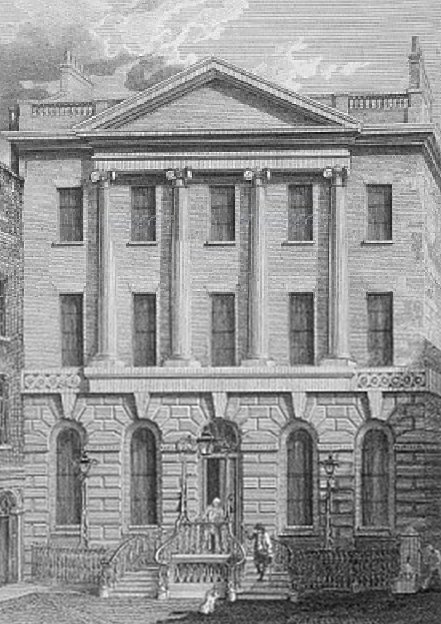
Amicable Society for a Perpetual Assurance Office, Serjeants' Inn, Fleet Street, London, 1801

Life insurance provides a monetary benefit to a decedent's family or other designated beneficiary, and may specifically provide for income to an insured person's family, burial, funeral and other final expenses. Life insurance policies often allow the option of having the proceeds paid to the beneficiary either in a lump sum cash payment or an annuity. In most US states, a person cannot purchase a policy on another person without their knowledge.

Annuities provide a stream of payments and are generally classified as insurance because they are issued by insurance companies, are regulated as insurance, and require the same kinds of actuarial and investment management expertise that life insurance requires. Annuities and pensions that pay a benefit for life are sometimes regarded as insurance against the possibility that a retiree will outlive his or her financial resources. In that sense, they are the complement of life insurance and, from an underwriting perspective, are the mirror image of life insurance.

Certain life insurance contracts accumulate cash values, which may be taken by the insured if the policy is surrendered or which may be borrowed against. Some policies, such as annuities and endowment policies, are financial instruments to accumulate or liquidate wealth when it is needed.

In many countries, such as the United States and the UK, the tax law provides that the interest on this cash value is not taxable under certain circumstances. This leads to widespread use of life insurance as a tax-efficient method of saving as well as protection in the event of early death.

In the United States, the tax on interest income on life insurance policies and annuities is generally deferred. However, in some cases the benefit derived from tax deferral may be offset by a low return. This depends upon the insuring company, the type of policy and other variables (mortality, market return, etc.). Moreover, other income tax saving vehicles (e.g., IRAs, 401(k) plans, Roth IRAs) may be better alternatives for value accumulation.

=== Burial insurance ===
Burial insurance is an old type of life insurance which is paid out upon death to cover final expenses, such as the cost of a funeral. The Greeks and Romans introduced burial insurance c. 600 CE when they organized collegia (guilds) called benevolent societies, which cared for the surviving families and paid funeral expenses of members upon death. Guilds in the Middle Ages served a similar purpose, as did friendly societies during Victorian times.

=== Property ===
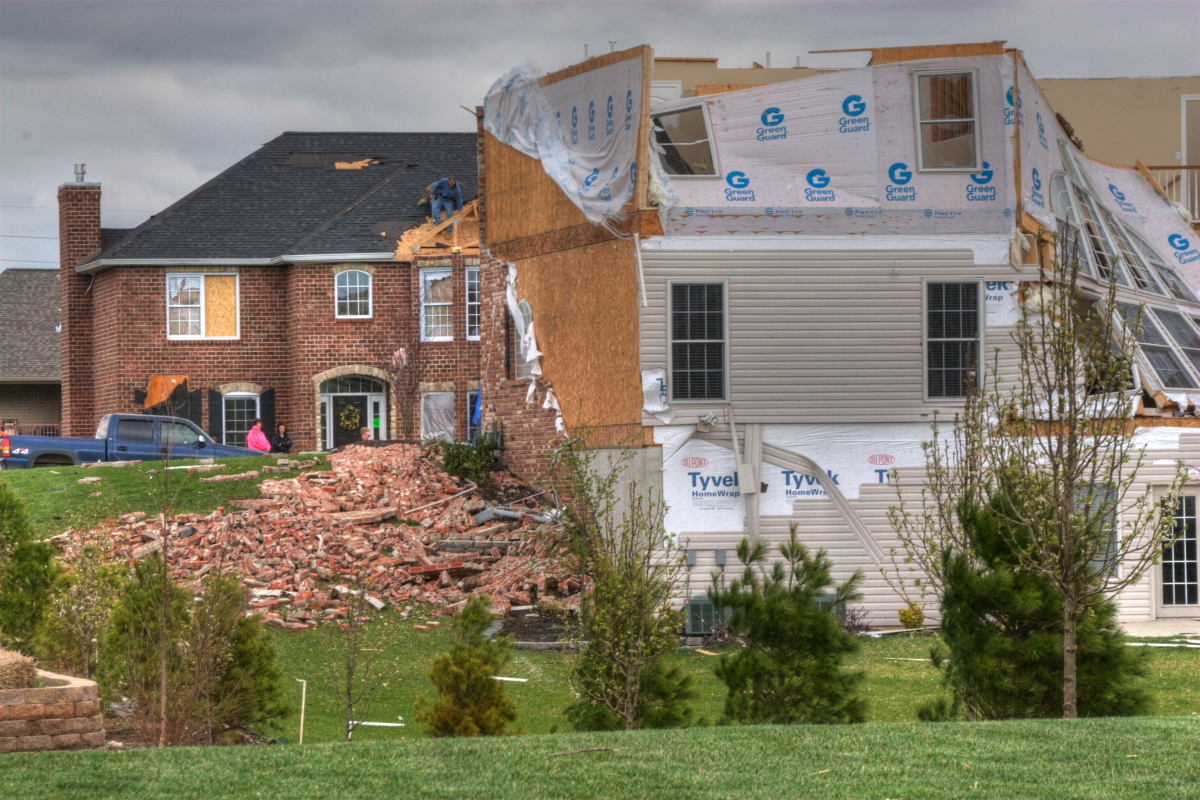
This tornado damage to an Illinois home would be considered an "Act of God" for insurance purposes.

Property insurance provides protection against risks to property, such as fire, theft or weather damage. This may include specialized forms of insurance such as fire insurance, flood insurance, earthquake insurance, home insurance, inland marine insurance or boiler insurance. The term property insurance may, like casualty insurance, be used as a broad category of various subtypes of insurance, some of which are listed below:

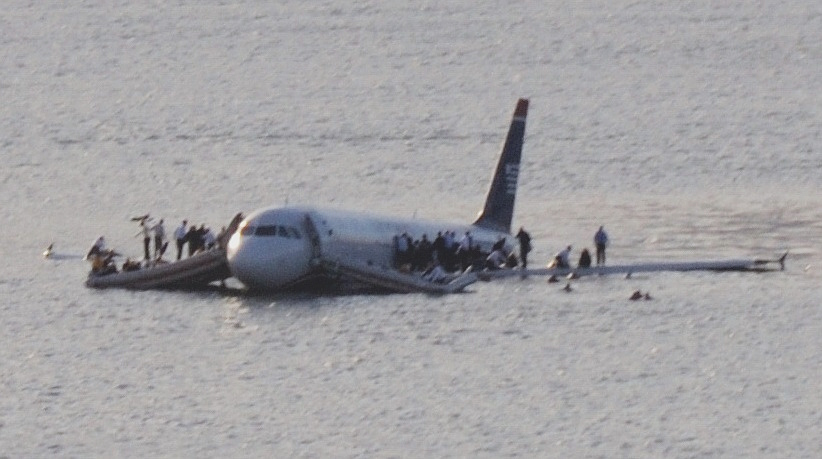
N106US, an Airbus A320-214 of US Airways, was written off after ditching into the Hudson River as US Airways Flight 1549 on January 15, 2009.

- Aviation insurance protects aircraft hulls and spares, and associated liability risks, such as passenger and third-party liability. Airports may also appear under this subcategory, including air traffic control and refuelling operations for international airports through to smaller domestic exposures.
- Boiler insurance (also known as boiler and machinery insurance, or equipment breakdown insurance) insures against accidental physical damage to boilers, equipment or machinery.
- Builder's risk insurance insures against the risk of physical loss or damage to property during construction. Builder's risk insurance is typically written on an "all risk" basis covering damage arising from any cause (including the negligence of the insured) not otherwise expressly excluded. Builder's risk insurance is coverage that protects a person's or organization's insurable interest in materials, fixtures or equipment being used in the construction or renovation of a building or structure should those items sustain physical loss or damage from an insured peril.
- Crop insurance may be purchased by farmers to reduce or manage various risks associated with growing crops. Such risks include crop loss or damage caused by weather, hail, drought, frost damage, pests (including especially insects), or disease—some of these being termed named perils. Index-based insurance uses models of how climate extremes affect crop production to define certain climate triggers that if surpassed have high probabilities of causing substantial crop loss. When harvest losses occur associated with exceeding the climate trigger threshold, the index-insured farmer is entitled to a compensation payment.
- Earthquake insurance is a form of property insurance that pays the policyholder in the event of an earthquake that causes damage to the property. Most ordinary home insurance policies do not cover earthquake damage. Earthquake insurance policies generally feature a high deductible. Rates depend on location and hence the likelihood of an earthquake, as well as the construction of the home.
- Fidelity bond is a form of casualty insurance that covers policyholders for losses incurred as a result of fraudulent acts by specified individuals. It usually insures a business for losses caused by the dishonest acts of its employees.

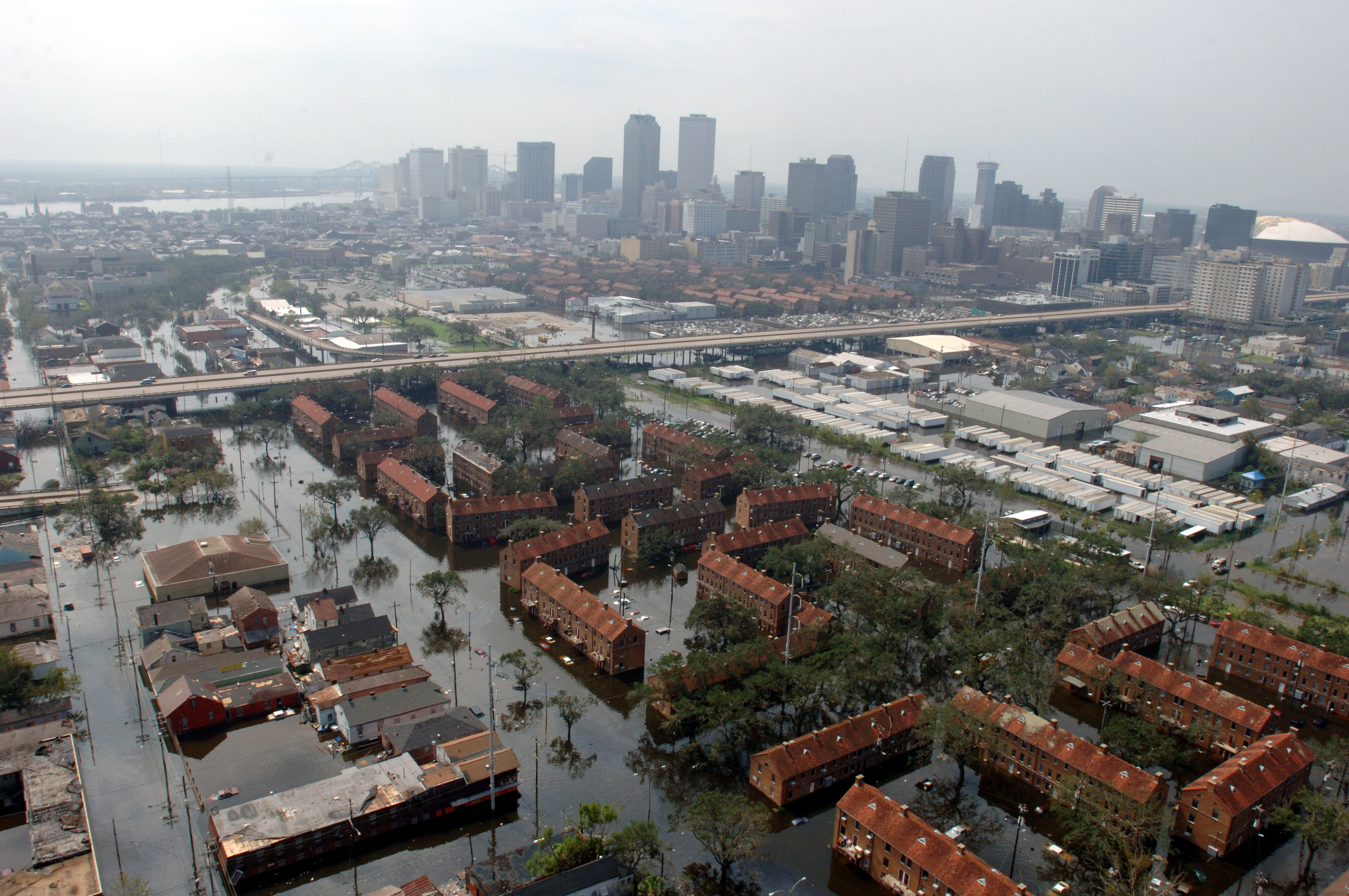
Hurricane Katrina caused over $80 billion of storm and flood damage.

- Flood insurance protects against property loss due to flooding. Many U.S. insurers do not provide flood insurance in some parts of the country. In response to this, the federal government created the National Flood Insurance Program which serves as the insurer of last resort.
- Home insurance, also commonly called hazard insurance or homeowners insurance (often abbreviated in the real estate industry as HOI), provides coverage for damage or destruction of the policyholder's home. In some geographical areas, the policy may exclude certain types of risks, such as flood or earthquake, that require additional coverage. Maintenance-related issues are typically the homeowner's responsibility. The policy may include inventory, or this can be bought as a separate policy, especially for people who rent housing. In some countries, insurers offer a package which may include liability and legal responsibility for injuries and property damage caused by members of the household, including pets.
- Landlord insurance covers residential or commercial property that is rented to tenants. It also covers the landlord's liability for the occupants at the property. Most homeowners' insurance, meanwhile, cover only owner-occupied homes and not liability or damages related to tenants.
- Marine insurance and marine cargo insurance cover the loss or damage of vessels at sea or on inland waterways, and of cargo in transit, regardless of the method of transit. When the owner of the cargo and the carrier are separate corporations, marine cargo insurance typically compensates the owner of cargo for losses sustained from fire, shipwreck, etc., but excludes losses that can be recovered from the carrier or the carrier's insurance. Many marine insurance underwriters will include "time element" coverage in such policies, which extends the indemnity to cover loss of profit and other business expenses attributable to the delay caused by a covered loss.
- Renters' insurance, often called tenants' insurance, is an insurance policy that provides some of the benefits of homeowners' insurance, but does not include coverage for the dwelling, or structure, with the exception of small alterations that a tenant makes to the structure.
- Supplemental natural disaster insurance covers specified expenses after a natural disaster renders the policyholder's home uninhabitable. Periodic payments are made directly to the insured until the home is rebuilt or a specified time period has elapsed.
- Surety bond insurance is a three-party insurance guaranteeing the performance of the principal.
- Volcano insurance is a specialized insurance protecting against damage arising specifically from volcanic eruptions.
- Windstorm insurance is an insurance covering the damage that can be caused by wind events such as hurricanes.

=== Liability ===
Liability insurance is a broad superset that covers legal claims against the insured. Many types of insurance include an aspect of liability coverage. For example, a homeowner's insurance policy will normally include liability coverage which protects the insured in the event of a claim brought by someone who slips and falls on the property; automobile insurance also includes an aspect of liability insurance that indemnifies against the harm that crashing a car can cause to others' lives, health, or property. The protection offered by a liability insurance policy is twofold: a legal defense in the event of a lawsuit commenced against the policyholder and indemnification (payment on behalf of the insured) with respect to a settlement or court verdict. Liability policies typically cover only the negligence of the insured, and will not apply to results of wilful or intentional acts by the insured.

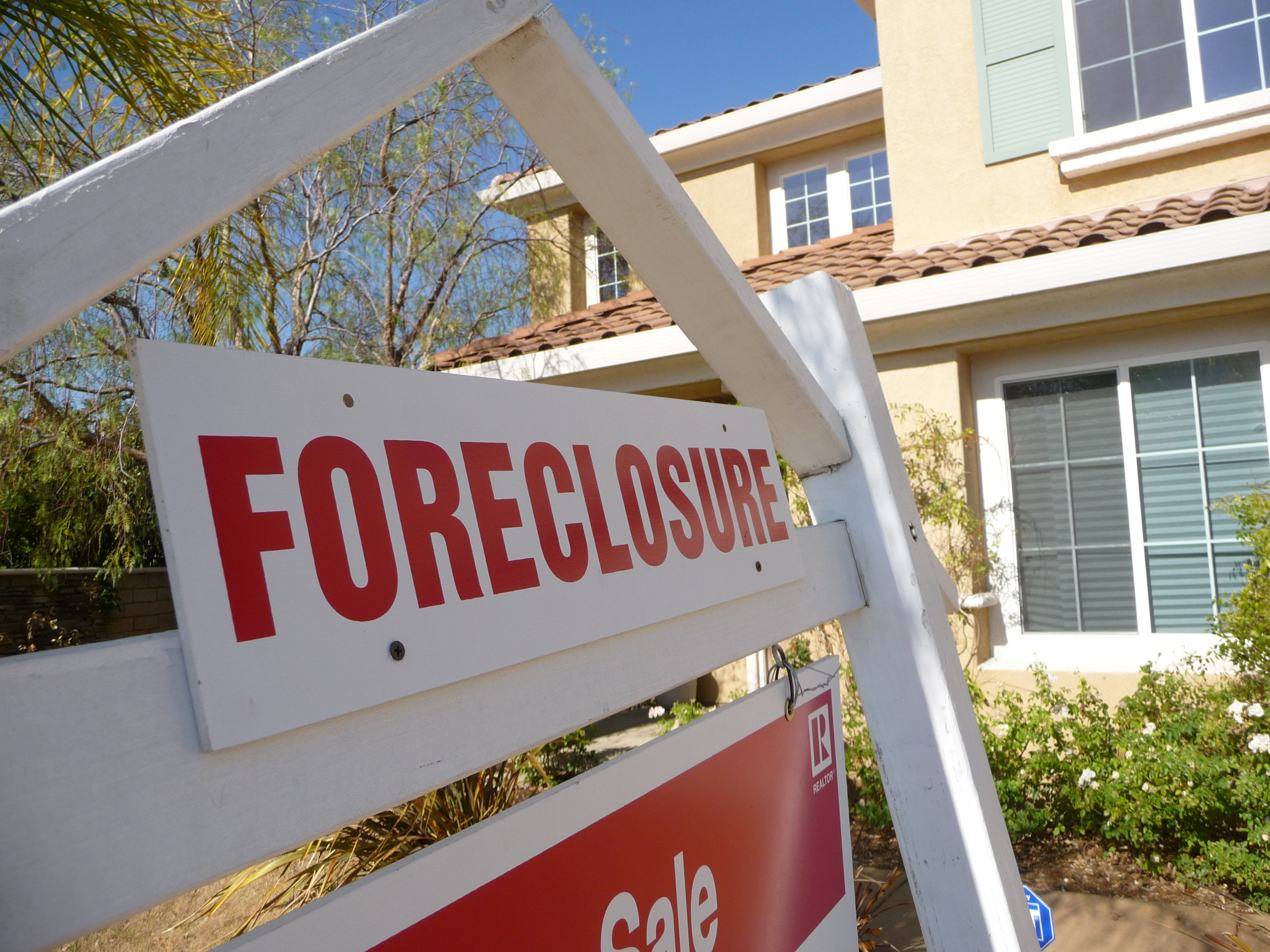
The subprime mortgage crisis was the source of many liability insurance losses.

- Public liability insurance or general liability insurance covers a business or organization against claims should its operations injure a member of the public or damage their property in some way.
- Directors and officers liability insurance (D&O) protects an organization (usually a corporation) from costs associated with litigation resulting from errors made by directors and officers for which they are liable.
- Environmental liability or environmental impairment insurance protects the insured from bodily injury, property damage and cleanup costs as a result of the dispersal, release or escape of pollutants.
- Errors and omissions insurance (E&O) is business liability insurance for professionals such as insurance agents, real estate agents and brokers, architects, third-party administrators (TPAs) and other business professionals.
- Prize indemnity insurance protects the insured from giving away a large prize at a specific event. Examples would include offering prizes to contestants who can make a half-court shot at a basketball game, or a hole-in-one at a golf tournament.
- Professional liability insurance, also called professional indemnity insurance (PI), protects insured professionals such as architectural corporations and medical practitioners against potential negligence claims made by their patients/clients. Professional liability insurance may take on different names depending on the profession. For example, professional liability insurance in reference to the medical profession may be called medical malpractice insurance.

Often a commercial insured's liability insurance program consists of several layers. The first layer of insurance generally consists of primary insurance, which provides first dollar indemnity for judgments and settlements up to the limits of liability of the primary policy. Generally, primary insurance is subject to a deductible and obligates the insurer to defend the insured against lawsuits, which is normally accomplished by assigning counsel to defend the insured. In many instances, a commercial insured may elect to self-insure. Above the primary insurance or self-insured retention, the insured may have one or more layers of excess insurance to provide coverage with additional limits of indemnity protection. There are a variety of types of excess insurance, including "stand-alone" excess policies (policies that contain their own terms, conditions, and exclusions), "follow form" excess insurance (policies that follow the terms of the underlying policy except as specifically provided), and "umbrella" insurance policies (excess insurance that in some circumstances could provide coverage that is broader than the underlying insurance).

=== Credit ===
Credit insurance repays some or all of a loan when the borrower is insolvent.

- Mortgage insurance insures the lender against default by the borrower. Mortgage insurance is a form of credit insurance, although the name "credit insurance" is more often used to refer to policies that cover other kinds of debt.
- Many credit cards offer payment protection plans which are a form of credit insurance.
- Trade credit insurance is business insurance over the accounts receivable of the insured. The policy pays the policy holder for covered accounts receivable if the debtor defaults on payment.
- Collateral protection insurance (CPI) insures property (primarily vehicles) held as collateral for loans made by lending institutions.

=== Cyber attack insurance ===
Cyber-insurance is a business lines insurance product intended to provide coverage to corporations from Internet-based risks, and more generally from risks relating to information technology infrastructure, information privacy, information governance liability, and activities related thereto.

=== Other types ===
- Active assailant insurance—also known as deadly weapons or malicious attack insurance—covers liability for non-terrorist violence, e.g violence not prompted by a specific ideology or motive. It can also cover services such as crisis-response hotlines to gauge the seriousness of a threat. As of 2026, half of global demand comes from the US, representing $100 million in premiums.
- All-risk insurance is an insurance that covers a wide range of incidents and perils, except those noted in the policy. All-risk insurance is different from peril-specific insurance that cover losses from only those perils listed in the policy. In car insurance, an all-risk policy also includes the damages caused by the own driver.

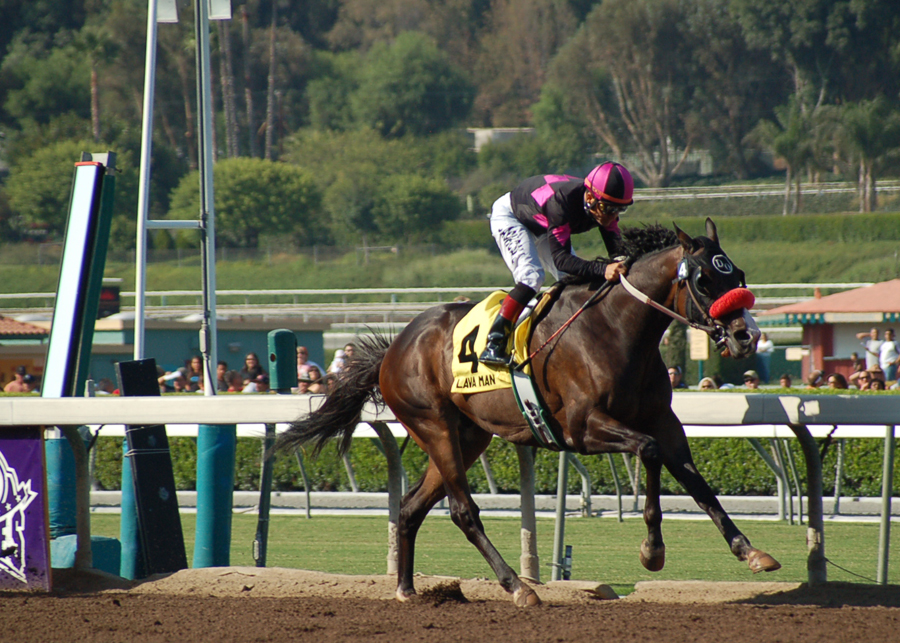
High-value horses may be insured under a bloodstock policy.

- Bloodstock insurance covers individual horses or a number of horses under common ownership. Coverage is typically for mortality as a result of accident, illness or disease but may extend to include infertility, in-transit loss, veterinary fees, and prospective foal.
- Business interruption insurance covers the loss of income, and the expenses incurred, after a covered peril interrupts normal business operations.
- Defense Base Act (DBA) insurance provides coverage for civilian workers hired by the government to perform contracts outside the United States and Canada. DBA is required for all U.S. citizens, U.S. residents, U.S. Green Card holders, and all employees or subcontractors hired on overseas government contracts. Depending on the country, foreign nationals must also be covered under DBA. This coverage typically includes expenses related to medical treatment and loss of wages, as well as disability and death benefits.
- Expatriate insurance provides individuals and organizations operating outside of their home country with protection for automobiles, property, health, liability and business pursuits.
- Hired-in plant insurance covers liability where, under a contract of hire, the customer is liable to pay for the cost of hired-in equipment and for any rental charges due to a plant hire firm, such as construction plant and machinery.
- Legal expenses insurance covers policyholders for the potential costs of legal action against an institution or an individual. When something happens which triggers the need for legal action, it is known as "the event". There are two main types of legal expenses insurance: before the event insurance and after the event insurance.
- Livestock insurance is a specialized policy provided to, for example, commercial or hobby farms, aquariums, fish farms or any other animal holding. Cover is available for mortality or economic slaughter as a result of accident, illness or disease but can extend to include destruction by government order.
- Media liability insurance is designed to cover professionals that engage in film and television production and print, against risks such as defamation.
- Nuclear incident insurance covers damages resulting from an incident involving radioactive materials and is generally arranged at the national level. (See the nuclear exclusion clause and, for the United States, the Price–Anderson Nuclear Industries Indemnity Act.)
- Over-redemption insurance is purchased by businesses to protect themselves financially in the event that a promotion ends up becoming more successful than was originally anticipated and/or budgeted for.
- Pet insurance insures pets against accidents and illnesses; some companies cover routine/wellness care and burial, as well.
- Pollution insurance usually takes the form of first-party coverage for contamination of insured property either by external or on-site sources. Coverage is also afforded for liability to third parties arising from contamination of air, water, or land due to the sudden and accidental release of hazardous materials from the insured site. The policy usually covers the costs of cleanup and may include coverage for releases from underground storage tanks. Intentional acts are specifically excluded.
- Purchase insurance is aimed at providing protection on the products people purchase. Purchase insurance can cover individual purchase protection, warranties, guarantees, care plans and even mobile phone insurance. Such insurance is normally limited in the scope of problems that are covered by the policy.
- Tax insurance is increasingly being used in corporate transactions to protect taxpayers in the event that a tax position it has taken is challenged by the IRS or a state, local, or foreign taxing authority
- Title insurance provides a guarantee that title to real property is vested in the purchaser or mortgagee, free and clear of liens or encumbrances. It is usually issued in conjunction with a search of the public records performed at the time of a real estate transaction.
- Travel insurance is an insurance cover taken by those who travel abroad, which covers certain losses such as medical expenses, loss of personal belongings, travel delay, and personal liabilities.
- Tuition insurance insures students against involuntary withdrawal from cost-intensive educational institutions
- Interest rate insurance protects the holder from adverse changes in interest rates, for instance, for those with a variable rate loan or mortgage
- Divorce insurance is a form of contractual liability insurance that pays the insured a cash benefit if their marriage ends in divorce.

=== Insurance financing vehicles ===
- Fraternal insurance is provided on a cooperative basis by fraternal benefit societies or other social organizations.
- No-fault insurance is a type of insurance policy (typically automobile insurance) where insureds are indemnified by their own insurer regardless of fault in the incident.
- Protected self-insurance is an alternative risk financing mechanism in which an organization retains the mathematically calculated cost of risk within the organization and transfers the catastrophic risk with specific and aggregate limits to an insurer so the maximum total cost of the program is known. A properly designed and underwritten protected self-insurance program reduces and stabilizes the cost of insurance and provides valuable risk management information.
- Retrospectively rated insurance is a method of establishing a premium on large commercial accounts. The final premium is based on the insured's actual loss experience during the policy term, sometimes subject to a minimum and maximum premium, with the final premium determined by a formula. Under this plan, the current year's premium is based partially (or wholly) on the current year's losses, although the premium adjustments may take months or years beyond the current year's expiration date. The rating formula is guaranteed in the insurance contract. Formula: retrospective premium = converted loss + basic premium × tax multiplier. Numerous variations of this formula have been developed and are in use.
- Formal self-insurance (active risk retention) is the deliberate decision to pay for otherwise insurable losses out of one's own money. This can be done on a formal basis by establishing a separate fund into which funds are deposited on a periodic basis, or by simply forgoing the purchase of available insurance and paying out-of-pocket. Self-insurance is usually used to pay for high-frequency, low-severity losses. Such losses, if covered by conventional insurance, mean having to pay a premium that includes loadings for the company's general expenses, cost of putting the policy on the books, acquisition expenses, premium taxes, and contingencies. While this is true for all insurance, for small, frequent losses the transaction costs may exceed the benefit of volatility reduction that insurance otherwise affords.
- Reinsurance is a type of insurance purchased by insurance companies or self-insured employers to protect against unexpected losses. Financial reinsurance is a form of reinsurance that is primarily used for capital management rather than to transfer insurance risk.
- Social insurance is a collection of insurance coverages (including components of life insurance, disability income insurance, unemployment insurance, health insurance, and others, often consolidated as part of a social security program), requiring participation by all citizens or residents. By forcing everyone in a society to become a policyholder and pay premiums, it provides a social safety net, ensuring that everyone can become a claimant when necessary. Examples of such programs are National Insurance in the United Kingdom or Social Security in the United States.
- Stop-loss insurance provides protection against catastrophic or unpredictable losses. It is purchased by organizations who do not want to assume 100% of the liability for losses arising from the plans. Under a stop-loss policy, the insurance company becomes liable for losses that exceed certain limits called deductibles.

=== Closed community and governmental self-insurance ===
Some communities prefer to create virtual insurance among themselves by other means than contractual risk transfer, which assigns explicit numerical values to risk. A number of religious groups, including the Amish and some Muslim groups, depend on support provided by their communities when disasters strike. The risk presented by any given person is assumed collectively by the community who all bear the cost of rebuilding lost property and supporting people whose needs are suddenly greater after a loss of some kind. In supportive communities where others can be trusted to follow community leaders, this tacit form of insurance can work. In this manner the community can even out the extreme differences in insurability that exist among its members. Some further justification is also provided by invoking the moral hazard of explicit insurance contracts.

In the United Kingdom, The Crown (which, for practical purposes, meant the civil service) did not insure property such as government buildings. If a government building was damaged, the cost of repair would be met from public funds because, in the long run, this was cheaper than paying insurance premiums. Since many UK government buildings have been sold to property companies and rented back, this arrangement is now less common.

In the United States, the most prevalent form of self-insurance is governmental risk management pools. They are self-funded cooperatives, operating as carriers of coverage for the majority of governmental entities today, such as county governments, municipalities, and school districts. Rather than these entities independently self-insuring and risking bankruptcy from a large judgment or catastrophic loss, such governmental entities form a risk pool. Such pools begin their operations by capitalization through member deposits or bond issuance. Coverage (such as general liability, auto liability, professional liability, workers compensation, and property) is offered by the pool to its members, similar to coverage offered by insurance companies. However, self-insured pools offer members lower rates (due to not needing insurance brokers), increased benefits (such as loss prevention services) and subject matter expertise. Of approximately 91,000 distinct governmental entities operating in the United States, 75,000 are members of self-insured pools in various lines of coverage, forming approximately 500 pools. Although a relatively small corner of the insurance market, the annual contributions (self-insured premiums) to such pools have been estimated at up to 17 billion dollars annually.

== Insurance companies ==
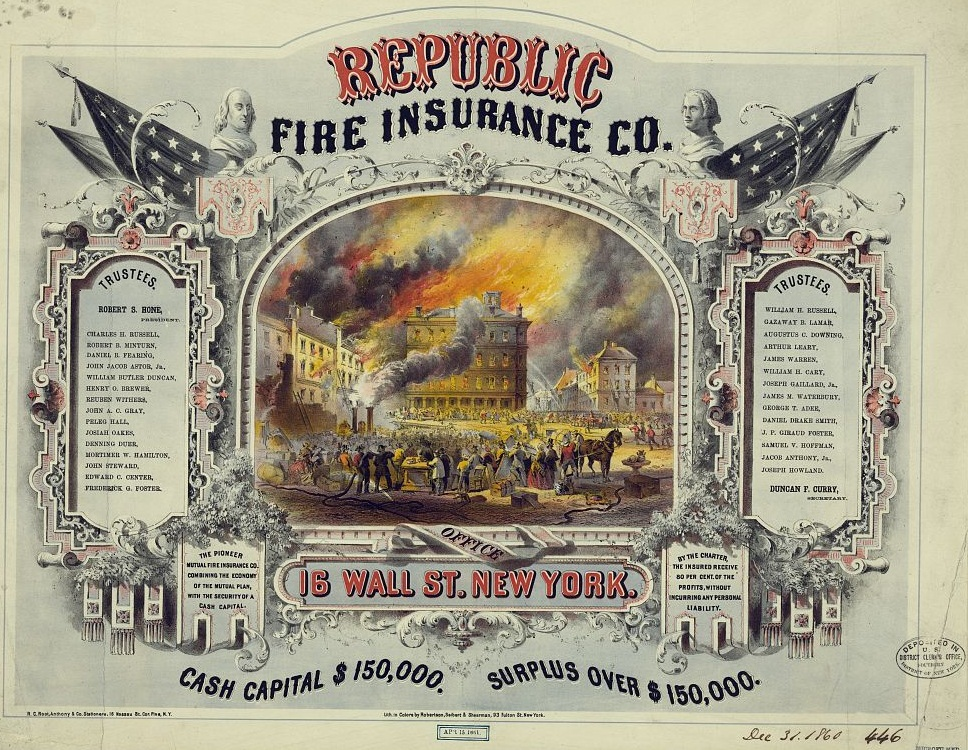
Certificate issued by Republic Fire Insurance Co. of New York c. 1860

Insurance companies may provide any combination of insurance types, but are often classified into three groups:

- Life insurance companies, that provide life insurance, annuities and pension products and bear similarities to asset management businesses
- Non-life or property/casualty insurance companies, which provides other types of insurance.
- Health insurance companies, which sometimes provide life insurance or employee benefits as well

General insurance companies can be further divided into these sub categories.

- Standard lines
- Excess lines

In most countries, life and non-life insurers are subject to different regulatory regimes and different tax and accounting rules. The main reason for the distinction between the two types of company is that life, annuity, and pension business is long-term in nature—coverage for life assurance or a pension can cover risks over many decades. By contrast, non-life insurance cover usually covers a shorter period, such as one year.

=== Mutual versus proprietary ===
Insurance companies are commonly classified as either mutual or proprietary companies. Mutual companies are owned by the policyholders, while shareholders (who may or may not own policies) own proprietary insurance companies.

Demutualization of mutual insurers to form stock companies, as well as the formation of a hybrid known as a mutual holding company, became common in some countries, such as the United States, in the late 20th century. However, not all states permit mutual holding companies.

=== Reinsurance companies ===
Reinsurance companies are insurance companies that provide policies to other insurance companies, allowing them to reduce their risks and protect themselves from substantial losses. The reinsurance market is dominated by a few large companies with huge reserves. A reinsurer may also be a direct writer of insurance risks as well.

=== Captive insurance companies ===
Captive insurance companies can be defined as limited-purpose insurance companies established with the specific objective of financing risks emanating from their parent group or groups. This definition can sometimes be extended to include some of the risks of the parent company's customers. In short, it is an in-house self-insurance vehicle. Captives may take the form of a "pure" entity, which is a 100% subsidiary of the self-insured parent company; of a "mutual" captive, which insures the collective risks of members of an industry; and of an "association" captive, which self-insures individual risks of the members of a professional, commercial or industrial association. Captives represent commercial, economic and tax advantages to their sponsors because of the reductions in costs they help create and for the ease of insurance risk management and the flexibility for cash flows they generate. Additionally, they may provide coverage of risks which is neither available nor offered in the traditional insurance market at reasonable prices.

The types of risk that a captive can underwrite for their parents include property damage, public and product liability, professional indemnity, employee benefits, employers' liability, motor and medical aid expenses. The captive's exposure to such risks may be limited by the use of reinsurance.

Captives are becoming an increasingly important component of the risk management and risk financing strategy of their parent. This can be understood against the following background:

- Heavy and increasing premium costs in almost every line of coverage
- Difficulties in insuring certain types of fortuitous risk
- Differential coverage standards in various parts of the world
- Rating structures which reflect market trends rather than individual loss experience
- Insufficient credit for deductibles or loss control efforts

=== Other forms ===
Other possible forms for an insurance company include reciprocals, in which policyholders reciprocate in sharing risks, and Lloyd's organizations.

=== Admitted versus non-admitted ===
Admitted insurance companies are those in the United States that have been admitted or licensed by the state licensing agency. The insurance they provide is called admitted insurance. Non-admitted companies have not been approved by the state licensing agency, but are allowed to provide insurance under special circumstances when they meet an insurance need that admitted companies cannot or will not meet.

=== Insurance consultants ===
There are also companies known as "insurance consultants". Like a mortgage broker, these companies are paid a fee by the customer to shop around for the best insurance policy among many companies. Similar to an insurance consultant, an "insurance broker" also shops around for the best insurance policy among many companies. However, with insurance brokers, the fee is usually paid in the form of commission from the insurer that is selected rather than directly from the client.

Neither insurance consultants nor insurance brokers are insurance companies and no risks are transferred to them in insurance transactions. Third party administrators are companies that perform underwriting and sometimes claims handling services for insurance companies. These companies often have special expertise that the insurance companies do not have.

=== Financial stability and rating ===
The financial stability and strength of an insurance company is a consideration when buying an insurance contract. An insurance premium paid currently provides coverage for losses that might arise many years in the future. For that reason, a more financially stable insurance carrier reduces the risk of the insurance company becoming insolvent, leaving their policyholders with no coverage (or coverage only from a government-backed insurance pool or other arrangements with less attractive payouts for losses). A number of independent rating agencies provide information and rate the financial viability of insurance companies.

Insurance companies are rated by various agencies such as AM Best. The ratings include the company's financial strength, which measures its ability to pay claims. It also rates financial instruments issued by the insurance company, such as bonds, notes, and securitization products.

== Across the world ==
Advanced economies account for the bulk of the global insurance industry. According to Swiss Re, the global insurance market wrote $7.186 trillion in direct premiums in 2023. ("Direct premiums" means premiums written directly by insurers before accounting for ceding of risk to reinsurers.) The United States was the country with the largest insurance market with $3.226 trillion (44.9%) of direct premiums written, with the People's Republic of China coming in second at only $723 billion (10.1%), the United Kingdom coming in third at $374 billion (5.2%), and Japan coming in fourth at $362 billion (5.0%). However, the European Union's single market is the actual second largest market, with 16 percent market share.

=== Regulatory differences ===
In the United States, insurance is regulated by the states under the McCarran–Ferguson Act, with "periodic proposals for federal intervention", and a nonprofit coalition of state insurance agencies called the National Association of Insurance Commissioners works to harmonize the country's different laws and regulations. The National Conference of Insurance Legislators (NCOIL) also works to harmonize the different state laws. 1988 California Proposition 103 is claimed to reduce home insurance rates, while it is blamed by some for reduced availability of home insurance in wildfire-distressed neighborhoods.

In the European Union, the Third Non-Life Directive and the Third Life Directive, both passed in 1992 and effective 1994, created a single insurance market in Europe and allowed insurance companies to offer insurance anywhere in the EU (subject to permission from authority in the head office) and allowed insurance consumers to purchase insurance from any insurer in the EU. As far as insurance in the United Kingdom, the Financial Services Authority took over insurance regulation from the General Insurance Standards Council in 2005; laws passed include the Insurance Companies Act 1973 and another in 1982, and reforms to warranty and other aspects under discussion as of 2012.

The insurance industry in China was nationalized in 1949 and thereafter offered by only a single state-owned company, the People's Insurance Company of China, which was eventually suspended as demand declined in a communist environment. In 1978, market reforms led to an increase in the market and by 1995 a comprehensive Insurance Law of the People's Republic of China was passed, followed in 1998 by the formation of China Insurance Regulatory Commission (CIRC), which has broad regulatory authority over the insurance market of China.

In India IRDA is insurance regulatory authority. As per the section 4 of IRDA Act 1999, Insurance Regulatory and Development Authority (IRDA), which was constituted by an act of parliament. National Insurance Academy, Pune is apex insurance capacity builder institute promoted with support from Ministry of Finance and by LIC, Life & General Insurance companies.

In 2017, within the framework of the joint project of the Bank of Russia and Yandex, a special check mark (a green circle with a tick and 'Реестр ЦБ РФ' (Unified state register of insurance entities) text box) appeared in the search for Yandex system, informing the consumer that the company's financial services are offered on the marked website, which has the status of an insurance company, a broker or a mutual insurance association.

== Insurance practices and controversies ==
=== Does not reduce the risk ===
Insurance is just a risk transfer mechanism wherein the financial burden which may arise due to some fortuitous event is transferred to a bigger entity (i.e., an insurance company) by way of paying premiums. This only reduces the financial burden and not the actual chances of happening of an event. Insurance is a risk for both the insurance company and the insured. The insurance company understands the risk involved and will perform a risk assessment when writing the policy.

As a result, the premiums may go up if they determine that the policyholder will file a claim. However, premiums might reduce if the policyholder commits to a risk management program as recommended by the insurer. It is therefore important that insurers view risk management as a joint initiative between policyholder and insurer since a robust risk management plan minimizes the possibility of a large claim for the insurer while stabilizing or reducing premiums for the policyholder. University of Tennessee research published in 2014 found that all company staff in the businesses they surveyed recognised the importance of insurance but largely they were too distant within their organization from the provision or cost of insurance to be able to relate to company insurance needs.

If a person is financially stable and plans for life's unexpected events, they may be able to go without insurance. However, they must have enough to cover a total and complete loss of employment and of their possessions. Some states will accept a surety bond, a government bond, or even making a cash deposit with the state.

=== Moral hazard ===
An insurance company may inadvertently find that its insureds may not be as risk-averse as they might otherwise be (since, by definition, the insured has transferred the risk to the insurer), a concept known as moral hazard. This 'insulates' many from the true costs of living with risk, negating measures that can mitigate or adapt to risk and leading some to describe insurance schemes as potentially maladaptive.

=== Complexity of insurance policy contracts ===
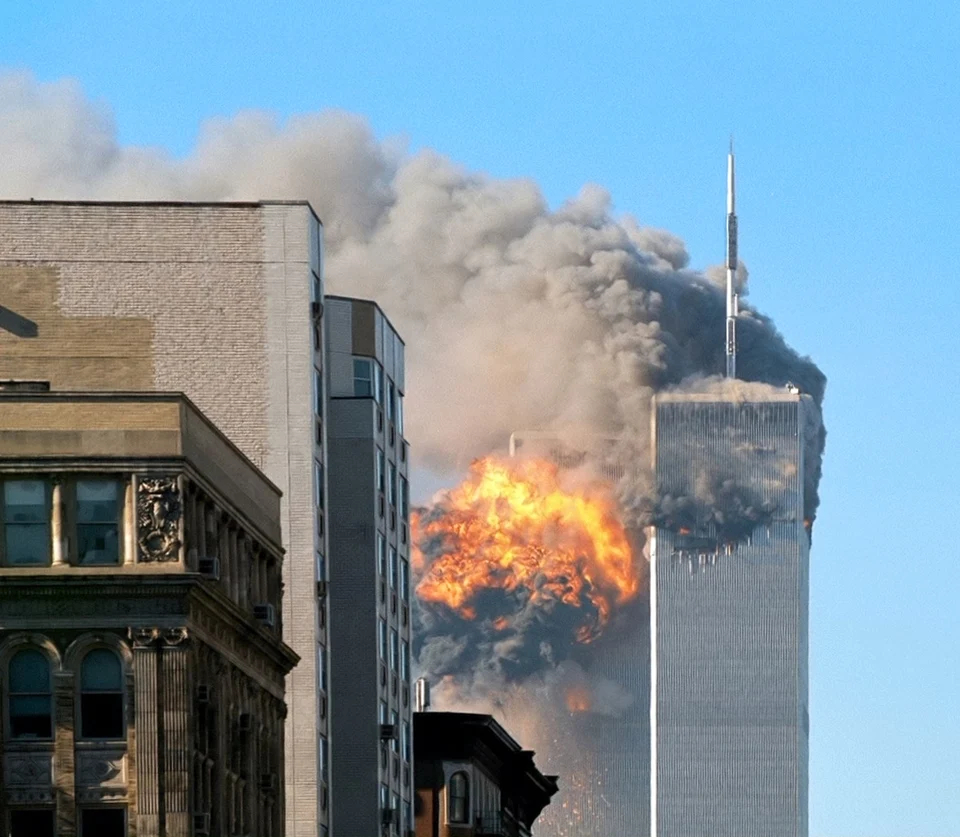
9/11 was a major insurance loss, but there were disputes over the World Trade Center's insurance policy.

Insurance policies can be complex and some policyholders may not understand all the fees and coverages included in a policy. As a result, people may buy policies on unfavorable terms. In response to these issues, many countries have enacted detailed statutory and regulatory regimes governing every aspect of the insurance business, including minimum standards for policies and the ways in which they may be advertised and sold.

For example, most insurance policies in the English language today have been carefully drafted in plain English; the industry learned the hard way that many courts will not enforce policies against insureds when the judges themselves cannot understand what the policies are saying. Typically, courts construe ambiguities in insurance policies against the insurance company and in favor of coverage under the policy.

Many institutional insurance purchasers buy insurance through an insurance broker. While on the surface it appears the broker represents the buyer (not the insurance company), and typically counsels the buyer on appropriate coverage and policy limitations, in the vast majority of cases a broker's compensation comes in the form of a commission as a percentage of the insurance premium, creating a conflict of interest in that the broker's financial interest is tilted toward encouraging an insured to purchase more insurance than might be necessary at a higher price. A broker generally holds contracts with many insurers, thereby allowing the broker to "shop" the market for the best rates and coverage possible.

Insurance may also be purchased through an agent. A tied agent, working exclusively with one insurer, represents the insurance company from whom the policyholder buys (while a free agent sells policies of various insurance companies). Just as there is a potential conflict of interest with a broker, an agent has a different type of conflict. Because agents work directly for the insurance company, if there is a claim the agent may advise the client to the benefit of the insurance company. Agents generally cannot offer as broad a range of selection compared to an insurance broker.

An independent insurance consultant advises insureds on a fee-for-service retainer, similar to an attorney, and thus offers completely independent advice, free of the financial conflict of interest of brokers or agents. However, such a consultant must still work through brokers or agents in order to secure coverage for their clients.

=== Limited consumer benefits ===
In the United States, economists and consumer advocates generally consider insurance to be worthwhile for low-probability, catastrophic losses, but not for high-probability, small losses. Because of this, consumers are advised to select high deductibles and to not insure losses which would not cause a disruption in their life. However, consumers have shown a tendency to prefer low deductibles and to prefer to insure relatively high-probability, small losses over low-probability, perhaps due to not understanding or ignoring the low-probability risk. This is associated with reduced purchasing of insurance against low-probability losses, and may result in increased inefficiencies from moral hazard.

=== Redlining ===
Redlining is the practice of denying insurance coverage in specific geographic areas, supposedly because of a high likelihood of loss, while the alleged motivation is unlawful discrimination. Racial profiling or redlining has a long history in the property insurance industry in the United States. From a review of industry underwriting and marketing materials, court documents, and research by government agencies, industry and community groups, and academics, it is clear that race has long affected and continues to affect the policies and practices of the insurance industry.

In July 2007, the US Federal Trade Commission (FTC) released a report presenting the results of a study concerning credit-based insurance scores in automobile insurance. The study found that these scores are effective predictors of risk. It also showed that African-Americans and Hispanics are substantially overrepresented in the lowest credit scores, and substantially underrepresented in the highest, while Caucasians and Asians are more evenly spread across the scores. The credit scores were also found to predict risk within each of the ethnic groups, leading the FTC to conclude that the scoring models are not solely proxies for redlining. The FTC indicated little data was available to evaluate benefit of insurance scores to consumers. The report was disputed by representatives of the Consumer Federation of America, the National Fair Housing Alliance, the National Consumer Law Center, and the Center for Economic Justice, for relying on data provided by the insurance industry.

All states have provisions in their rate regulation laws or in their fair trade practice acts that prohibit unfair discrimination, often called redlining, in setting rates and making insurance available.

In determining premiums and premium rate structures, insurers consider quantifiable factors, including location, credit scores, gender, occupation, marital status, and education level. However, the use of such factors is often considered to be unfair or unlawfully discriminatory, and the reaction against this practice has in some instances led to political disputes about the ways in which insurers determine premiums and regulatory intervention to limit the factors used.

An insurance underwriter's job is to evaluate a given risk as to the likelihood that a loss will occur. Any factor that causes a greater likelihood of loss should theoretically be charged a higher rate. This basic principle of insurance must be followed if insurance companies are to remain solvent. Thus, "discrimination" against (i.e., negative differential treatment of) potential insureds in the risk evaluation and premium-setting process is a necessary by-product of the fundamentals of insurance underwriting. For instance, insurers charge older people significantly higher premiums than they charge younger people for term life insurance. Older people are thus treated differently from younger people (i.e., a distinction is made, discrimination occurs). The rationale for the differential treatment goes to the heart of the risk a life insurer takes: older people are likely to die sooner than young people, so the risk of loss (the insured's death) is greater in any given period of time and therefore the risk premium must be higher to cover the greater risk. However, treating insureds differently when there is no actuarially sound reason for doing so is unlawful discrimination.

=== Insurance patents ===
New assurance products can now be protected from copying with a business method patent in the United States.

A recent example of a new insurance product that is patented is Usage Based auto insurance. Early versions were independently invented and patented by a major US auto insurance company, Progressive Auto Insurance (U.S. patent 5,797,134) and a Spanish independent inventor, Salvador Minguijon Perez.

Many independent inventors are in favor of patenting new insurance products since it gives them protection from big companies when they bring their new insurance products to market. Independent inventors account for 70% of the new U.S. patent applications in this area.

Patenting new insurance products can be risky, as it is practically impossible for insurance companies to determine if their product will infringe on a pre-existing patent. For example, in 2004, The Hartford insurance company had to pay $80 million to an independent inventor, Bancorp Services, in order to settle a patent infringement and theft of trade secret lawsuit for a type of corporate owned life insurance product invented and patented by Bancorp.

There are currently about 150 new patent applications on insurance inventions filed per year in the United States. The rate at which patents have been issued has steadily risen from 15 in 2002 to 44 in 2006.

The first US insurance patent was granted in 2005, which concerned coverage of data transferred over the internet. Another example of an application posted was posted in 2009. This patent application describes a method for increasing the ease of changing insurance companies.

=== Insurance on demand ===
Insurance on demand (also IoD) is an insurance service that provides clients with coverage for a specific occasion or event when needed; i.e. only episodic rather than on a 24/7 basis as is typically provided by traditional policies. For example, air travelers can purchase a policy for one single plane flight, rather than a longer-lasting travel insurance plan.

=== Insurance industry and rent-seeking ===
Certain insurance products and practices have been described as rent-seeking by critics. That is, some insurance products or practices are useful primarily because of legal benefits, such as reducing taxes, as opposed to providing protection against risks of adverse events.

=== Religious concerns ===
Muslim scholars have varying opinions about life insurance. Life insurance policies that earn interest (or guaranteed bonus/NAV) are generally considered to be a form of riba (usury) and some consider even policies that do not earn interest to be a form of gharar (speculation). Some argue that gharar is not present due to the actuarial science behind the underwriting. Jewish rabbinical scholars also have expressed reservations regarding insurance as an avoidance of God's will but most find it acceptable in moderation.

Some Christians believe insurance represents a lack of faith. There is a long history of resistance to commercial insurance in Anabaptist communities (Mennonites, Amish, Hutterites, Brethren in Christ), but many participate in community-based self-insurance programs that spread risk within their communities.

== See also ==
- Agent of record
- DIRTI 5 – abbreviation for depreciation, interest, repairs, taxes, and insurance
- Earthquake loss
- Financial adviser
- Artificial intelligence in insurance
- Financial risk management § Insurance
- Global assets under management
- Interest rate risk § Insurers
- Insurance broker
- Insurance fraud
- Insurance Hall of Fame
- Insurance law
- International Association for the Study of Insurance Economics
- List of insurance topics
- Loss control consultant
- Outline of finance
- Reinsurance
- Risk pool
- Social security
- Tertiary sector of the economy (sector of the economy to which insurance belongs)
- The Invisible Bankers: Everything the Insurance Industry Never Wanted You to Know (book)
- Universal health care
- Welfare state
- Uberrima fides – Latin for "utmost good faith", a legal doctrine used in insurance

Country-specific articles:

- Insurance in Australia
- Insurance industry in China
- Insurance in India
- Insurance in the United Kingdom
- Insurance in the United States
