= Underwriting profit =

Insurance industry term

Underwriting profit, also called underwriting income, is the profit an insurer makes from underwriting activities after claims and underwriting expenses are accounted for, excluding any investment income.

It is commonly described as premiums (often on an earned or net basis) less losses and underwriting expenses, including loss adjustment expenses.

Underwriting profit is often discussed alongside the combined ratio, which combines loss and expense ratios as an indicator of underwriting profitability.

== Definition ==
Underwriting profit is the profit or loss from the underwriting operations of an insurance company, before income from investing premiums and other assets is taken into account. It is commonly described as premiums (often stated net of reinsurance) less claims costs and underwriting expenses, so a negative result is an underwriting loss.

Terminology and presentation vary across jurisdictions and reporting frameworks. In the United States, "underwriting income" has a definition in the Internal Revenue Code for computing insurance company taxable income. In investor and reporting discussions around IFRS 17, underwriting profit is described as premium income less insurance claims and expenses, and the term is often treated as most applicable to non-life insurance, with other subtotals commonly used for life insurers.

== Components and calculation ==
Underwriting profit is commonly expressed as premiums less losses, loss adjustment expenses, and underwriting expenses. It is often stated net of reinsurance, because reinsurance premiums and recoveries affect the premiums retained and the claims costs borne by the insurer.

The premium amount used in calculations may be based on premiums written or premiums earned. In actuarial and financial reporting contexts, earned premium refers to the portion of written premium attributable to coverage provided during the period, with the remainder recorded as unearned premium.

Claims costs are commonly described as losses plus loss adjustment expenses. Loss adjustment expenses are the costs incurred in adjusting, recording, and paying claims. Underwriting expenses include other operating costs of acquiring and servicing insurance business, and are distinct from investment expenses that relate to earning investment income.

== Relationship to performance measures ==
Underwriting profit is often discussed using the combined ratio, a summary measure of underwriting performance commonly calculated as the sum of the loss ratio and the expense ratio. In general usage, a combined ratio below 100% indicates an underwriting profit and a combined ratio above 100% indicates an underwriting loss, because claims costs and underwriting expenses are being compared with premiums on a consistent basis.

The combined ratio is defined and used in more than one way. For example, some statutory and industry presentations include additional items such as policyholder dividends in the combined ratio calculation, so figures may not be directly comparable between sources without confirming the basis used.

== Investment income and overall profitability ==
Insurers are often analysed by separating the result of underwriting from the result of investing assets that back insurance liabilities and capital. In many reports, measures of operating profit are described as incorporating both the return from underwriting and from financial investments, while subtotals focused on insurance services exclude investment income and insurance finance income or expense.

Because underwriting profit excludes investment income, an insurer can report an underwriting loss and still be profitable overall if investment income and other income exceed the underwriting loss. Regulatory and industry reporting commonly discusses profitability as being supported by both underwriting performance and investment income.

== Examples ==
Published reports sometimes show underwriting profit, underwriting result, or underwriting earnings as a subtotal in a reconciliation table. The steps below reproduce the line items as shown in the cited sources, and the metric labels follow the sources' terminology.

- Lloyd's reported an underwriting profit of £1,505 million for the six months ended 30 June 2025. In its pro forma statement, the underwriting result is presented as gross premiums earned, less gross claims incurred and gross operating expenses, adjusted for the reinsurance balance.
  - Gross premiums earned: £26,108m
  - Gross claims incurred: £15,425m
  - Gross operating expenses: £7,870m
  - Reinsurance balance: £1,308m
  - Underwriting result: £1,505m
- GEICO reported pre-tax underwriting earnings of $7,813 million for 2024. Berkshire Hathaway's annual report presents the subtotal as premiums earned less losses and loss adjustment expenses and underwriting expenses.
  - Premiums earned: $42,252m
  - Losses and loss adjustment expenses: $30,331m
  - Underwriting expenses: $4,108m
  - Pre-tax underwriting earnings: $7,813m
- In the United States, the National Association of Insurance Commissioners reported a $13.7 billion underwriting gain for the property and casualty industry for the first half of 2025. The report presents an underwriting gain (loss) line item alongside net premiums earned, net losses and loss adjustment expenses incurred, underwriting expenses, and related ratios.
  - Net premiums earned: $473.8bn
  - Net loss and loss adjustment expenses incurred: $335.9bn
  - Underwriting expenses: $124.0bn
  - Dividend ratio: 0.29%
  - Combined ratio: 96.4%
  - Underwriting gain (loss): $13.7bn

== See also ==
- Insurance
- Financial services (broader industry to which insurance belongs)
- Insurance law
- List of finance topics
- List of insurance topics
- List of United States insurance companies
- Opportunity cost
- Social security
