= Prize indemnity insurance =

Indemnification insurance for a prize promotion

General information
- Type: Indemnity insurance
- Field: Insurance, Risk management, Marketing promotion
- Introduced: Mid-20th century
- Definition: A type of insurance that covers the cost of awarding a prize if a participant successfully achieves a specified outcome in a contest or event.
- Purpose: Protects event organizers and sponsors from large financial losses due to rare prize-winning outcome = Applications
- Sports contests, promotional campaigns, and television game shows
- Common examples: Hole-in-one contests, half-court basketball shots, field-goal kicks, casino jackpots, retail sweepstakes
- Insured event: Participant achieves a statistically unlikely result that triggers a prize payout
- Beneficiaries: Event sponsors, advertisers, marketing agencies, broadcasters
- Notable case: The Price Is Right $1,000,000 Spectacular (2008) – multiple insured wins led to revised policy limits
- Related: Over-redemption insurance, Contingency insurance, Promotion

Prize indemnity insurance is indemnification insurance for a promotion in which the participants are offered the chance to win prizes. Instead of keeping cash reserves to cover large prizes, the promoter pays a premium to an insurance company, which then reimburses the insured should a prize be given away.

== Hole-in-one insurance ==
One of the earliest and most common forms of prize indemnity insurance is hole-in-one insurance. Hole-in-one insurance, often purchased by a golf tournament host or sponsor, reimburses tournament organizers for the cost of awarding a hole-in-one prize in the event a tournament participant successfully hits a hole-in-one during the tournament. Such policies typically outline strict verification rules, coverage limits, and player eligibility criteria to minimize fraudulent claims and ensure fairness.

According to the newspaper USA Today, the odds of an amateur golfer hitting a hole in one on an arbitrary par 3 hole are about 1 in 12,500. These low odds allow golf tournaments to offer expensive prizes to golfers able to hit a hole-in-one during tournament play. In order to be able to afford such expensive prizes, tournament hosts can purchase prize indemnity coverage to protect themselves from having to pay for the prize from their own funds.

Companies that provide hole-in-one insurance may provide signs or other accessories to help the tournament host promote the hole-in-one prize. The insurance contract between the golf tournament and insurance company will detail rules such as: which holes on the course the prize will be insured on, how to verify the hole-in-one was achieved legitimately, and what to do if a contestant hits a hole-in-one on a hole other than the insured hole. Variables that affect the cost of the hole-in-one insurance include: the number of participants in the tournament, the skill of the participants (amateur vs. professional golfers), the length of the insured hole, and the value of the prize being offered.

== Other uses ==
In addition to hole-in-one insurance for golf events, prize indemnity insurance companies typically offer coverages for other types of contests as well. For example, contest coverage can frequently be purchased for contests such as half-court shots in basketball, field-goal kicks in football, home runs in baseball, blue-line goals in hockey, and even retail and casino-based promotions as well.

For example, in the Super Bowl, prizes were set to be awarded for several events, including a return of the opening kickoff for a touchdown, a safety, and a fourth-quarter field goal of 50 yards (ca. 46 m) or more. Prize indemnity insurance was purchased to cover all these events. However, none of the events occurred in the game.

Most television game shows pay for prize indemnity insurance for million-dollar prizes. One example came from April 2008, when such an insurance provider demanded RTL Group and CBS toughen million dollar win provisions after The Price Is Right $1,000,000 Spectacular (a primetime series of episodes typically aired during sweeps periods, but because of the 2007-08 Writers Guild of America strike and a change of host in effect during that season, had become a 10-episode series that season) produced three millionaires in the six episodes produced that season under the new rules imposed for the season. At the time, the jackpot could be won by either tightened rules for pricing games that pushed precision, or to be within $1,000 of their Showcase round's actual retail price without going over, based on the much more expensive Showcases in primetime compared to daytime episodes. One player won the prize in Clock Game when she correctly priced two prizes in less than ten seconds. Two contestants won the prize for Showcase bids within the $1,000 margin. After the first series of tapings, four more episodes had been ordered because of ratings and to fill in programming gaps. For the final order of four episodes, the insurance company demanded that this threshold be reduced to $500 and that one of the a million-dollar pricing games be removed. No new $1,000,000 Spectacular episodes were produced after May 2008, possibly due to the insurance concerns.
