= Rent insurance =

Insurance for rent

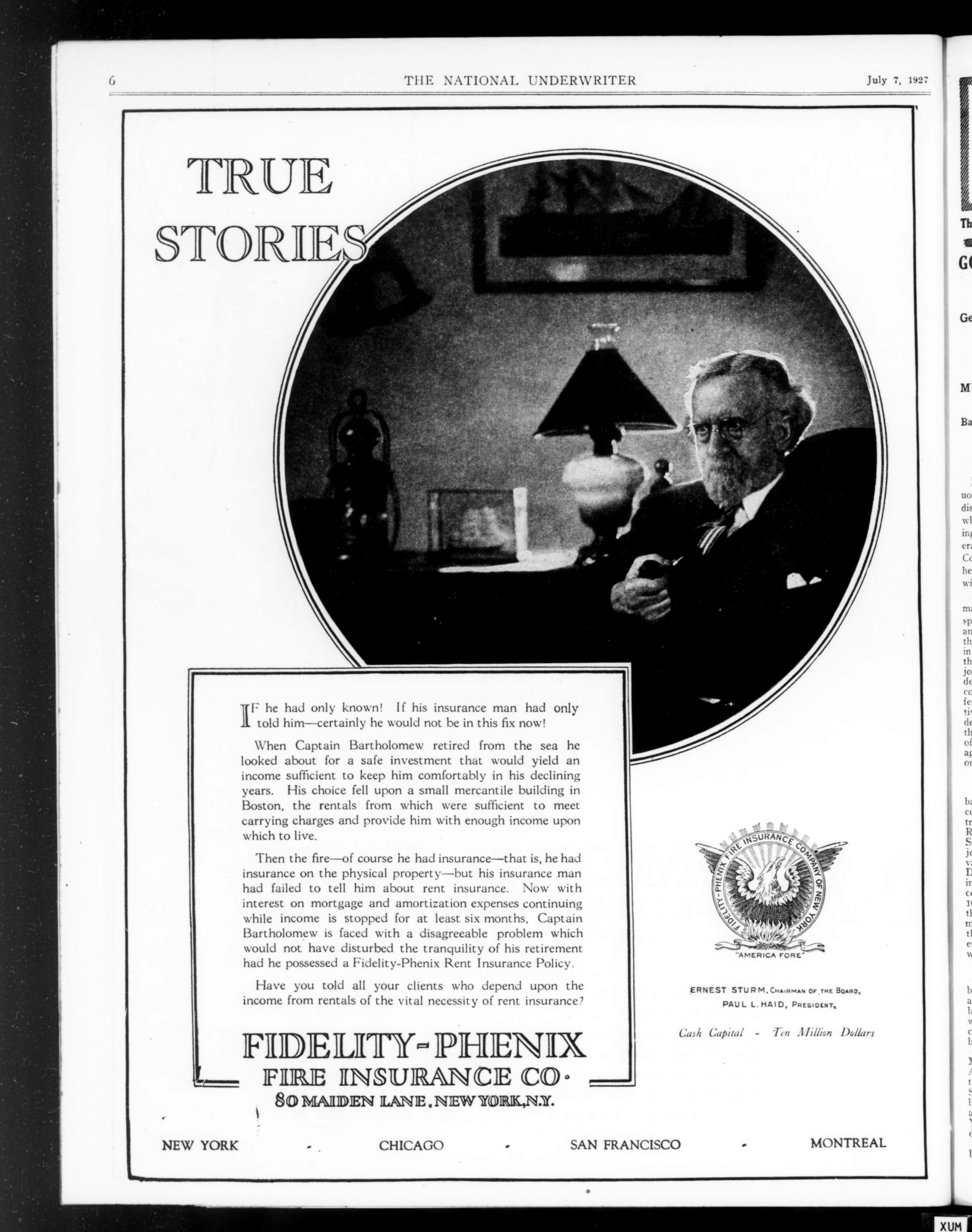
Advertisement for rent insurance 1927

Rent insurance is insurance that covers rent. Both landlords and tenants can purchase it, for inverse purposes. Landlords insure against the risk that their source of rental income will dry up. Tenants insure against the risk that they will not be able to pay rent they are obliged to pay under a lease.

== Coverage ==
Rent insurance refers both to business interruption insurance for landlords (the "business" being renting property) and to specific insurance just for lost rental income. The rent insurance policy document can be standalone or an endorsement (i.e., amendment to a standard form insurance policy) extending coverage under a fire insurance or property insurance policy.

The product is available both for tenants and landlords. For tenants, it can insure the obligation to pay rent under a lease even when the tenant is unable to pay or payment would be impractical (e.g., if the tenant cannot carry on business at the premises). For landlords, rent insurance can cover lost rent arising from multiple factors. These may include unmarketability of the premises (i.e., the landlord cannot find anyone to rent) or property damage (i.e., the premises cannot be leased because they are unusable).

There are two general types of loss that a landlord's rent insurance policy can cover: rental value and rental income. Lost rental value is rent income that could be generated from a vacant property if it were leased. Lost rental income is the lost stream of payments under an existing lease that requires a tenant to pay certain rent. The latter situation would arise, for example, if under the lease or under a statute, the tenant is relieved from paying rent if damage or loss of use occurs.

Tenants may insure against a third kind of loss: the increased cost of renting a different premises to which the tenant needs to move as a result of damage or loss of use to the originally rented property. This is called "leasehold interest insurance", and can apply if, for example, the original premises are destroyed or damaged by fire and hence unusable.

== In France ==
Beginning in 2016, a public–private partnership called Action Logement (Housing Action) implemented the Visale program in France. Visale is a public guarantee of rent payment. Initially designed for young people, those in precarious employment, and unemployed workers, it became available to guarantee rents for most students in 2018.

== In the United States ==
A series of lectures on fire insurance delivered in 1912 in Boston, Massachusetts, described rent insurance as of "rather recent origin". The anonymous lecturer continued: "There are many different forms under which rent insurance is written, forms of varying length, some clear, some ambiguous, and the tendency appears to be on the part of some brokers specializing on insurance of this sort, to continually broaden the contract in order to make it more attractive and thereby secure the placing of more insurance of this character for themselves."

As of 1960, the Nelson Broms Company, in a partnership with Continental Assurance Company, offered rent insurance via life insurance. Under the arrangement, a landlord could purchase coverage guaranteeing payment of rent to the end of a given lease if the tenant died before the lease was up.

A 1996 American law review article notes that, as of that time, rental insurance for landlords typically covered lost rent resulting from property damage to the leased premises. However, it typically did not cover lost rent resulting from loss of use of the property—a broader situation that would include cases where there is no physical damage to property but the premises cannot be used productively for other reasons.

== Guarantor Insurance ==
Guarantor insurance, also known as rent guarantor insurance or third party guarantor coverage, is a Surety product where a potential tenant purchases a product so as to insure the landlord against any unpaid rent. It is distinction from rent insurance in that the motivation to purchase coverage is not to reduce losses, but for the tenant to qualify for a lease they otherwise don't. This product is used primarily by international students, workers without credit history, self-employed individuals and retirees with savings, but little ongoing income.

Residential lease guarantee first emerged in the United States, particularly high cost of living markets like New York City. In the mid 2000s, as rising rents made it more difficult for tenants to qualify, and increased tenant protection laws made landlords more risk-averse, Insurent was founded as the first guarantor insurance insurance agency, followed later by TheGuarantors and PandaGuarantee.

In the United Kingdom, the Renters Rights Act has led to increased demand for guarantor insurance from companies like RentGuarantor and HousingHand. In Canada companies like Padder offer Guarantor Insurance. In Mexico, expats frequently need a "Póliza Jurídica" which serves a comparable function . Japan has a well developed guarantor industry, that while not offered as an insurance product, serves a similar purpose.

== Works cited ==
- Huebner, Solomon S. (1957). Property Insurance. Appleton. OCLC 1028742654.
- Morgan, Patrick J.; Williamson, Julie Ann Stuke (1996). "Rent Insurance: Are You Covered?". Property and Probate. 10: 25–31. ISSN 0164-0372.
- Riegel, Robert (1966). Insurance Principles and Practices (5th ed.). Prentice Hall. OCLC 706937.
- Society of Chartered Property and Casualty Underwriters (1981). Insuring the Lease Exposure. Cincinnati: National Underwriter Co. ISBN 978-0-87218-313-1.
