= Tuition insurance =

Insurance coverage for students

Tuition insurance is a form of insurance coverage designed to protect students and their families from financial losses in the event a student must withdraw from an educational institution - schools, colleges or universities - due to unforeseen circumstances. These circumstances typically include serious illness, injury, mental health conditions, or the death of a tuition payer. The insurance reimburses non-refundable tuition fees and, in some cases, associated costs such as room and board, and other fees.

Tuition insurance can be obtained through educational institutions or directly from an insurance provider. Most tuition insurance policies cover the cost of tuition in whole or partly if a student has to withdraw from his or her studies for medical reasons.

== History ==
Tuition insurance has existed since 1930. It was developed to mitigate the financial risks associated with investing in higher education, particularly when unexpected events prevent a student from completing their studies. It benefits both students and educational institutions since it may cover the money a student owes an educational institution in case the tuition payer can no longer cover these costs. Colleges and universities typically offer prorated refunds for a few weeks after the start of classes, and offer nothing after that time. Many institutions offer tuition insurance to help cover the gap.

Over time, tuition insurance has become more prevalent, especially in response to rising education costs and increased awareness of student health conditions. It rose in popularity during the COVID-19 pandemic as some families sought tuition refunds amid campus closures and the move to remote learning. Tuition insurance would not have helped those families. In June 2020, GradGuard and Allianz Global Assistance announced an accommodation for claims due to a covered student withdrawing from school due to COVID-19 illness. GradGuard Tuition Insurance was the first program to offer nationwide protection for epidemics, including getting sick with COVID-19, with its Epidemic Coverage Endorsement applied to all plans purchased on or after February 18, 2022.

=== Coverage Details ===
Tuition insurance policies vary by provider but generally cover:

- Medical withdrawals: Reimbursement if a student withdraws due to a serious illness or injury.
- Mental health withdrawals: Coverage for withdrawals related to mental health conditions, such as depression or anxiety.
- Death of a student or parent/guardian: Some policies provide coverage if a student or their parent/legal guardian passes away.

It's important to note that coverage applies only if the withdrawal occurs within a specified period during the academic term.

==== GradGuard Tuition Insurance ====
GradGuard is a prominent provider of tuition insurance in the United States. Since 2009, GradGuard has partnered with more than 600 colleges and universities, offering tuition protection and renters insurance to students. Their tuition insurance plans are designed to reimburse up to 100% of non-refundable tuition, fees, and room and board costs if a student withdraws for a covered reason.
