= Boiler insurance =

Insurance covering boilers

Boiler insurance (Boiler cover) is a type of insurance that covers repairs and in some instances, the replacement of a home or company boiler. In the United Kingdom, it can also cover other parts of the central heating system as well as plumbing and electrics. Sometimes boiler insurance is bundled together with inspection services according to standards such as the ASME Boiler and Pressure Vessel Code in the United States. In other jurisdictions, boiler inspection may be performed by a government agency such as the Office of The Chief Inspector of Boilers in Bangladesh or a separate inspection company such as TÜV in Germany or Austria.

== Types of boiler coverage ==
In the United Kingdom, more than 22 million households rely on a boiler for their heating and hot water. But boilers are not usually covered by standard home insurance and can be very costly to repair or replace. An owner of a building may purchase boiler insurance. Coverage is negotiated between the insurance carrier and may include the boiler only, the piping system, or the full heating system. Some insurance carriers also offer annual service packages.

The most costly coverage will include the full central heating system. Insurance is generally offered by gas and electric energy providers, although other companies also provide cover. Policies have various restrictions on the time of work and cost of repairs. Old equipment may not be insurable.

Boiler cover however is not the same as boiler insurance. Boiler cover is much more limited and has very strict guidelines on the amounts paid out towards repairs and new boilers. Insurance is regulated, whereas boiler cover is not. Boiler cover is generally cheaper and will cover most issues that arise with most boilers.

== Boilers in steam locomotives ==
Regular inspection of the boiler in a steam locomotive is required by many countries and other jurisdictions.

== See also ==
- Hartford Steam Boiler Inspection and Insurance Company
- Boiler explosion
