= Legal expenses insurance =

Type of insurance

Legal protection insurance (LPI), also known as legal expenses insurance (LEI) or simply legal insurance, is a particular class of insurance which facilitates access to law and justice by providing legal advice and covering the legal costs of a dispute, regardless of whether the case is brought by or against the policyholder. Depending on the national rules, legal protection insurers can also represent the policyholder out-of-court or even in-court.

== History ==
Legal protection insurance has a 100-year history. The concept originated in 1911 when members of the 'Automobile Club de l’Ouest' were offered several additional services among which protection in case of fines or for disputes in front of police courts. This basic legal protection was then extended to traffic accidents and gave rise to the first legal protection insurance policy in France offered by ‘La Défense Automobile et Sportive (DAS)’ which was founded in 1917. ‘La Défense Automobile et Sportive (DAS)’ offered legal services and coverage of expenses for legal prosecution to car drivers and athletes.

In 1928, a motoring club in Germany called the Deutsche Automobil Schutz (D.A.S.) increased membership contributions to create a similar pool to pay for the defence of its members charged with traffic related offences. Members of the general public then enquired about joining the scheme. That is when the idea of an insurance available to the general public became firmly established. At present, D.A.S. Germany is still the largest legal protection insurer in the world, followed by ARAG, another German insurer. Legal protection insurance is today well established in Europe and has been developing beyond. The German market alone has 36% market share worldwide, followed by France with 12%. The European market represents more than 80% of the global legal protection insurance market.

== Purpose and scope ==
Legal protection insurers cover the costs (e.g. legal fees and expenses of a lawyer) incurred in case of an unforeseen legal matter. These costs usually include lawyer and court fees, witness expenses, translation costs or expert fees. Depending on national law, legal protection insurers also provide legal services and represent policyholders out-of-court or in-court. The policyholder is usually protected for disputes in several areas of law such as contract, labour, consumer and family law (in rare cases including divorce). The premium is generally paid on an annual basis.

The extent of the cover depends on the type of contract and is defined in the policy terms and conditions. When the policy is sold as part of a home, motor or travel insurance package (i.e. add-on policy) it only covers disputes strictly linked to the purpose of the main cover (e.g. home related claims such as disputes with neighbours or car related disputes in case of a motor legal protection insurance). When legal protection insurance is purchased as a separate and independent insurance product (stand-alone cover) the range of services provided, the extent and scope of the cover are much larger. Sometimes legal protection insurance is offered as a benefit to members of a trade union or association.

In the European Union, precise rules govern legal protection insurance and explicitly define how insurers must organise their business and manage claims. These rules are included in the Solvency II Directive (Articles 198 - 205). Non-life insurance classes are listed in Annex II of the Solvency II Directive.

Legal protection insurance should not be confused with the coverage often included in a liability insurance. Liability coverage is designed to protect the policyholder against losses resulting from acts or omissions that are negligent and that result in damage to another person, their property or interests. Therefore, the main scope of third party liability insurance is to protect others from the consequences of the policyholder's wrong-doing. In other words, the third-party liability insurance reimburses the other party's damages which were caused by a negligent act of the insured. It does not intervene to protect the property and interests of the policyholder, except against being held liable for the other party's damages. It will also provide legal representation and pay the cost of defense of the policyholder if the policyholder is sued as a result of being involved in an accident because losing the liability claim would be detrimental for the liability insurer since he would have to bear the financial consequences. The liability insurer, however, does not assist the policyholder to seek justice as a plaintiff in case he suffered a damage.

== Different forms of legal protection insurance ==
Different forms of legal protection insurance exist and have developed depending on the national jurisdictions. Traditionally, legal protection insurance covers unforeseen events as Before-the-event insurance (BTE). The event in this case being the incident triggering the legal action. However, in some countries (e.g. Australia, Canada, and the UK), it is also possible to obtain cover after a legal dispute has been initiated which is described as After-the-event insurance (ATE). In the US market, legal protection and support is often granted via legal plans or pre-paid legal services which, most of the time, are not an insurance.

=== Before-the-event legal protection insurance ===
This form of insurance is the most widespread. It covers those wishing to protect themselves against possible future claims and it is purchased before the prospect of any legal dispute. It supports the policyholder either by providing legal advice or even by representing the policyholder in-court or out-of-court. It also covers the costs and expenses of legal proceedings.

=== After-the-event legal protection insurance ===
After-the-event or ATE policies insure legal actions relating to events that have already happened. This insurance covers an already existing dispute where, however, proceedings have not yet started or significant legal costs or disbursements have not been incurred. Should the case fail, ATE insurance protects the insured against the risk of having to pay own expenses and adverse costs. This type of cover is usually only available for disputes having high prospects of success where the insurer is likely to be able to recover his costs from the adverse party. It is available in Australia, Canada, and the UK.

In the UK, solicitors who take on, for example, personal injury cases on a "no win no fee" basis may require their clients, whether defendants or plaintiffs, to take out ATE insurance so that costs will be covered if the case is lost. The premium payments, especially in a no win no fee arrangement, may be deferred until the conclusion of the case; thus in most cases the premium itself is self-insured. This insurance is often offered by solicitors and claims management companies. Section 46 of the Legal Aid, Sentencing and Punishment of Offenders Act 2012 (which came into force on 1 April 2013) introduced an important change regarding the recoverability of the premium: before the Act went into force the policyholder could recover the premium paid from the losing party whilst now the premium has to be paid by the client out of any damages received.

== By jurisdiction ==
=== Overview ===
The European market for legal insurance is considered to be well-developed, with Germany, France and the Netherlands, representing respectively 43%, 14%, and 8% of the market. Legal protection insurance has become more common outside of Europe, including in Canada, Japan, South Africa and USA. It is also emerging in Australia, Chile, China, New Zealand and South Korea.

=== European Union and members ===
According to a survey commissioned by RIAD and conducted by Ipsos in August 2017 in Germany, France, Ireland, and the Netherlands, over a quarter of respondents had had a legal dispute in the previous five years. The replies showed that in all four countries people are mainly concerned about the costs of a dispute, this is particularly true in Ireland (50% of respondents) where fees for lawyers are extremely high. In comparison to the other countries, Dutch citizens are particularly wary of wasting time and energy (33%) while Germans tend to be concerned about being deprived of their rights (27% compared to 18% in Ireland and only 10% and 8% in France and the Netherlands). This is further complicated by the freedom of member states to regulate differently from the EU in some matters, for example necessitating insurance for individual farms which grow genetically engineered crops and intend to sell them to other EU member states.

=== Germany ===
Four out of ten Germans would be willing to take legal action if the average damage cost is around €600 . Legal insurance in Germany covers the lawyer fees and court costs. Some policies even pay for the bail. There are four types of legal insurance in Germany: private, traffic, real estate, and work. The cost of legal insurance varies based on the type of legal insurance. Customers can even take one or multiple types of legal insurance. A policy providing comprehensive coverage in Germany costs between €185 and €383 per annum as of 2026.

There are also several unions that offer legal support. For example, tenant associations and landlord associations offer legal advice to tenants and landlords respectively. These associations even help their members to settle the dispute out-of-court. However, associations offer no support when the case ends up in court. Legal insurance pays when the case goes into court. Lawyer's fees calculation are based on the Lawyers' Compensation Act (RVG). Per RVG, a lawyer's fee is calculated based on the amount or value in dispute.

=== Canada ===
The Canadian market has been growing rapidly and several companies (some native, some US-based) offer legal protection insurance. In 2016 legal protection insurance gross written premium was around 56 million Canadian dollars; compared to the previous year almost double. In order to promote further access to justice, in 2013, the Canadian Bar Association partnered with DAS Canada, a Canadian licensed specialist legal protection insurance company. In Québec, legal protection insurance is both endorsed and promoted by Québec's law society (bar association), Le Barreau du Québec.

=== Japan ===
The Japanese market had a gross written premium of around 600 million euros in 2016, which makes of Japan the fifth biggest market after Germany, France, USA and the Netherlands. In 2016, legal protection cover added-on to motor insurance represented 90% of the market share; this is due to the fact that stand-alone insurance has only been introduced in the last decade.

=== Netherlands ===
According to a survey commissioned in 2016 by the Dutch Ministry of Security and Justice, lawyers who provided services through legal protection insurers scored highest in regard of the perceived quality of services as well as on the basis of a peer review.

=== South Africa ===
In South Africa, legal insurance is primarily sold directly to consumers without intermediaries. Legal insurers resolve approximately eighty percent of cases through in-house legal counselors.

=== United Kingdom ===
In the United Kingdom, legal protection insurance is primarily marketed directly to the end user without an intermediary. The focus is on preventive dispute resolution via in-house lawyers. 80% of issues are resolved in-house. In its report of November 2017, The Law and Practicalities of Before-The-Event (BTE) Insurance – An Information Study, the UK Civil Justice Council concludes that legal protection insurance offers many people access to significant legal assistance. To this end, LPI's legal helplines are filling a real gap in the marketplace and in this regard insurers considerably improve access to justice in the current landscape. The report also sees a general lack of awareness among consumers about the existence of a legal protection cover as such as well as about the scope of the coverage. The report underlines that all stakeholders (lawyers, brokers, insurers, the Law Society, and the advice sector) can actively contribute to improving the awareness of legal protection insurance. With this the report confirms prior findings of two previous reports (Thematic Review of the UK's Motor Legal Expenses Insurance industry by the Financial Conduct Authority (FCA) of 2013, Report of the UK Ministry of Justice published in October 2007). The FCA saw that many consumers were not able to distinguish between the cover of motor insurance (protection against liability for third-party damages) and motor legal protection insurance (pursuit of claims to recover uninsured losses and protection against criminal prosecution). The 2007 report of the Ministry of Justice comes to the result that, although 59% of the UK population have some form of legal protection insurance (whether they knew it or not), fewer than one in four consumers had ever heard of BTE nor of ATE insurance. The Ministry's research estimated that 28 million British adults have actually BTE insurance, mostly as an add-on to another insurance policy.

Staged premium policies are available with, for example, an initial premium paid at the initiation of the claim, a second premium paid when proceedings are issued and a further premium paid just before trial, so long as each of these stages is reached.

In May 2012, District Judge Smedley, sitting as a Regional Costs Judge, considered eight test cases, the "Liverpool ATE Premium Test Cases", in which ATE insurance premiums had been taken out by the claimants, in order to look at

whether it [was] reasonable for a receiving party to use block rated policies when cheaper individually rated policies [were] available, whether the use of staged premium policies [was] reasonable or necessary, and whether in protocol cases (Note: This refers to the Pre-Action Protocol for Low Value Personal Injury Claims in Road Traffic Accidents from 31 July 2013, otherwise known as the RTA Protocol.) there [was] a need for an ATE policy before stage three, given the minimal risk of the claimant not recovering costs.

=== United States ===
Pre-paid legal services are relatively new in the United States. There are a variety of online legal services that offer legal plans which usually cover specific events like drafting a contract or a will, while legal protection insurance covers unforeseen events (e.g. employment or consumer disputes). Legal plans rely mainly on bulk savings (for instance mass purchasing of legal services or in-house counsel for a specified group of people, such as trade union members) rather than on insurance principles, i.e. they do not include guarantees like insurance but provide cover only until the accumulated funds are used up. Legal plans are offered by trade unions as a free benefit of union membership or they are set up by groups of people having a common interest, like university students.

== See also ==
- Retainer agreement
