= Condition of average =

Form of insurance calculation

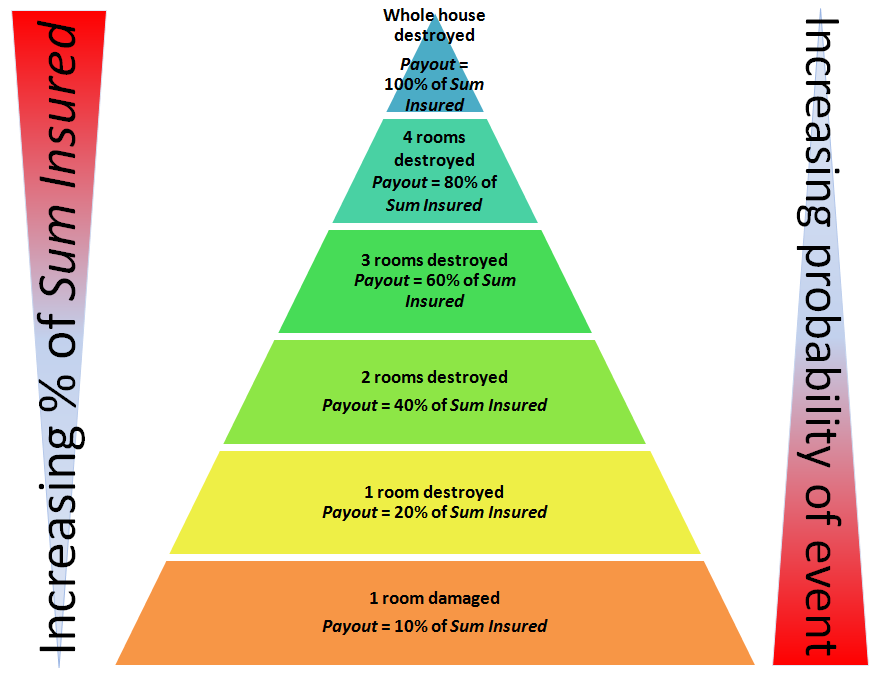
Illustration of the partial payout of Sum Insured against probability of occurrence

Condition of average (also called underinsurance in the U.S., or principle of average, subject to average, or pro rata condition of average in Commonwealth countries) is the insurance term used when calculating a payout against a claim where the policy undervalues the sum insured. In the event of partial loss, the amount paid against a claim will be in the same proportion as the value of the underinsurance.

The formula used is

$\text{Payout} = \text{Adjusted Loss} \times \frac {\text{Sum Insured}} {\text{Current Value}}$

where Payout is the amount paid out by the policy, Adjusted Loss is the realisable amount from the amount claimed against the policy after a loss, Sum Insured is the maximum amount to be paid out by the policy, and Current Value is the value the policy should be insured for. Underinsurance occurs when Sum Insured is less than Current Value.

Sum Insured is the maximum amount that can be paid out and is only paid out in cases of total destruction. Where partial destruction occurs (a more common occurrence than total destruction), Payout is pro rata in line with the underinsurance. This is due to insurance companies basing the premiums on their risk of losing the full Sum Insured against total destruction events.

== Buildings insurance ==
Where a building's insurance policy is subject to average, underinsurance can result in very high liabilities on the owner. For example, if a flood or fire causes $3M of partial damage, the building is insured for $5M, but its true value is determined to be $10M, the payout will be

$$\text{Payout} = \text{Claim} \times \frac {\text{Sum Insured}} {\text{Current Value}} = \$3 \mbox{M} \times \frac {\$5 \mbox{M}} {\$10 \mbox{M}} = \$1.5 \mbox{M}$$

This would leave the owner with an underinsurance shortfall of $1.5M. In the case where a building is listed and has a mandatory rebuild order, it could be ruinous.

Under certain conditions, if the sum insured is 75% or more of the current value, no deduction is made for partial losses. This is an example of a coinsurance, with coinsurance requirement of 75%.

== Contents insurance ==
The contents of buildings are insured either separately from the buildings, or, frequently with dwelling houses, as a separate part of a combined buildings/contents insurance policy. Whether separate or joint policies are used, the insurance claim on either part cannot be transferred to the other, for example, under insurance of the contents cannot be offset by the claim made on the buildings insurance.

When contents insurance states that new-for-old applies, this increases the likelihood of under insurance. For example, a quantity of items amongst the contents might have a low resale value but a high new-for-old value. This can happen if quantities of used or second-hand goods are collected; their resale value may be low, but to replace as-new would require a high payout against the policy. In such a case, if the policy is subject to average, any claim will be reduced by the value of the underinsurance. Crucially, this occurs with partial loss of the contents, even where the low-resale value contents are completely undamaged and may even be stored separately, as in an undamaged outhouse covered as part of the policy.

Due to the potentially high shortfall burden, some countries, notably New Zealand, mandate that all policies subject to average have the policyholder acknowledge the risks of underinsurance; the statute giving the following example to be incorporated into the policy:

“The Meaning of Subject to Average
“(1) Your insurance policy contains a provision making it ‘subject to average’.
“(2) That provision will have effect only if the property insured under the policy is underinsured at the time of loss.
“(3) If the property insured under the policy is underinsured at the time of loss, the following rules apply:

“(a) If you suffer a total loss, the provision will have no effect:
“(b) If you suffer a partial loss, the maximum amount that you may recover will bear the same proportion to your actual loss as the amount for which the property is insured bears to the full value of the property:
“(c) Whatever your loss, in no case will you be entitled to recover more than the amount for which the property is insured.

“Example: Your property is worth $20,000. You insure it for $10,000. You suffer a loss of $5,000. If your policy is ‘subject to average’, the maximum amount that you may recover will be $2,500.”

To remove the risk of homeowners unwittingly falling into an underinsurance trap, New Zealand has legislation to ban the use of average clauses for dwelling houses.

== Cargo insurance ==
The history of average clauses began with cargo insurance. Here, if a proportion of a cargo had to be thrown overboard in storm to save the ship, all cargo owners and the shipowner would jointly make good the loss to the owner of the cargo thrown overboard, including those that occurred the loss. The share each of the owners would pay would be based on their proportion of the total value of cargo or ship. This is commonly termed the law of general average.

Average clauses can cause problems with claims made during periods of volatility in commodities markets. For example, if crude was being shipped from one part of the world to another, and a partial loss occurred, if its current value had risen, the amount paid out by the insurance company may not cover the value of the contract.

== See also ==
- Insurance
- Home insurance
- Betterment
- Coinsurance
