= Retainer agreement =

Contract retaining future work

A retainer agreement is a work-for-hire contract. It falls between a one-off contract and permanent employment, which may be full-time or part-time. Its distinguishing feature is that the client or customer pays in advance for professional work to be specified later. The purpose of a retainer fee is to ensure that the employed reserves time for the client in the future when their services are needed.

A retainer agreement may incorporate other contractual provisions regarding the performance of services, or the parties may potentially enter into additional contracts that define the other terms of their working relationship. A retainer fee may be paid on a fixed, pre-negotiated rate or on a variable hourly rate depending on the nature of retainer and also, the practice of the professional being retained.

== Legal services ==
It is common for a person seeking the services of a lawyer (attorney) to pay a retainer ("retainer fee") to the lawyer, to see a case through to its conclusion. A retainer can be a single advance payment or a recurring (e.g. monthly) payment. Absent an agreement to the contrary, a retainer fee is refundable if the work is not performed.

The retainer agreement may serve as the basis of authority for a legal advocate. It may limit a lawyer's authority to specific tasks or services, as opposed to providing authority for general purposes. For example, if a lawyer is hired for purposes of litigation, during litigation the advocate will normally be authorized by the client to accept service of documents for which personal service upon the client is not required. In addition to being formally described in a retainer agreement, a client's grant of authority to an attorney may be implied, apparent or usual through the normal practice of the legal professional in providing representation to a client.

== See also ==
- Contingent fee
- Legal expenses insurance
