= Interest rate insurance =

Interest rate insurance protects the holder of a variable rate mortgage or loan from rising interest rates. It is generally offered independently of the original borrowing and typically as an alternative to a remortgage onto a fixed rate.

As the insurance policy protects only against the risk of the repayments rising because of interest rates (and not of the borrower defaulting on repayments) there is no requirement for the insurer to check the credit status of the purchaser or the value of any secured asset.

The absence of arrangement and valuation fees, bank and legal charges means that interest rate insurance can be cheaper to provide than a remortgage. The absence of credit checks and valuations means it can be made available to all holders of a variable rate loan.

As interest rate insurance protects the holder from rising interest rates but does not raise their initial pay rate, if interest rates fall, the policyholder will see a benefit in reduced payments on their mortgage or loan when compared to a fixed rate alternative.

== History (UK) ==
Monetary Policy Committee member Professor David Miles first highlighted interest rate insurance in the Miles Review in 2004 commissioned by Gordon Brown. Professor Miles suggested that it would provide greater security in housing finance. In the 2008 Budget, HM Treasury announced that the industry was ready to launch such a product.

In July 2008 MarketGuard launched an interest rate insurance policy RateGuard.
