= Over-redemption insurance =

Policy to insure a sales promotion

Over-redemption Insurance (also sometimes called over-redemption coverage) is a type of insurance that is purchased by businesses to protect themselves financially in the event that a promotion ends up becoming more successful than was originally anticipated and/or budgeted for. Over-redemption insurance is commonly used by retailers, advertising agencies and brand managers to reduce the financial risk of a running a marketing or sales promotion.

== How over-redemption insurance works ==
Since it is difficult to predict how successful a company's promotion will end up becoming, unexpected costs can easily accumulate if both the cost and success of the promotion are underestimated. With over-redemption insurance, if a company goes over the promotional budget they had originally planned for, the financial risk of those increased costs gets transferred to the insurer, thus protecting the company's budget.

== How over-redemption insurance is rated ==
Insurance companies rate over-redemption insurance based upon a number of factors. These factors include, but are not limited to: what type of company is requesting the insurance and how long they've been in business, if the promotion is new or being renewed, the duration which the promotion is being held, the target area of the product, the number of units sold, the cost per unit, the number of units the company will be using during the promotion, the monetary value of the coupon, whether or not any advertising costs are applicable, previous promotions and/or redemptions results, and of course, the desired amount of insurance that the client is requesting.

An example of over-redemption insurance would be if a company is running a promotion in which consumers must collect a certain number of proofs of purchase from a yogurt lid in order to receive a $100 prize. The company may predict a 20% response rate (i.e. 20% of all consumers will participate in the promotion and actively collect the yogurt lids). In case the promotion ends up becoming vastly more popular than the company initially intended, they may call an insurance company to purchase the coverage, paying a premium to cover unforeseen promotional costs, if the promotion reaches a response rate above 20%. A company may choose to either purchase coverage for up to the full 100% response rate, from 20–50% response, or coverage as their budget allows.
