= IFRS 17 =

Financial standard on insurance contracts

IFRS 17 is the International Financial Reporting Standard detailing how reporting entities issuing insurance contracts account for the resulting rights and obligations. The standard describes a general approach but permits in some cases a simplified approach. The general approach requires to measure the rights and obligations based on the risk adjusted expected present value of future cash flows and an allocation of initial excess premiums over the coverage period.

The standard applies to: Insurance contracts, including reinsurance contracts, issued by the reporting entity; Reinsurance contracts held by the reporting entity; Investment contracts with discretionary participation features (DPF) issued by the reporting entity, provided the entity also issues insurance contracts.

== Calculation ==
Under the IFRS 17 general model, insurance contract liabilities will be calculated as the expected present value of future insurance cash flows with a provision for non-financial risk. The discount rate will reflect current time value of money adjusted for financial risk without double counting, considering the lack of liquidity of the insurance contracts since the reporting entity cannot normally sell the insurance contract; see Interest rate risk § Insurers.

If the risk-adjusted expected present value of future cash flows would produce a gain at the time a contract is recognized, the model would also require to recognize a "contractual service margin" as part of the liability to offset the day 1 gain. The contractual service margin would be released to insurance revenue over the life of the contract. The income statement presentation for insurance contracts is based on the conceptual definition of revenue and expenses. IFRS 17 includes specific disclosure requirements.

For short-duration insurance contracts, insurers are permitted to use a simplified method, a.k.a. Premium Allocation Approach ('PAA'). Under this simplified method, the total premium (less insurance acquisition cash flows) is not allocated to periods based on an actuarial valuation but on the basis of passage of time or in proportion to the expected timing of incurred insurance service expenses.

Some insurance contracts include participation features where the entity shares the performance of underlying items with policyholders in an extent that the remaining profit of the insurer has the character of a contractual fee. IFRS 17 has a specific accounting approach for such participating contracts, defined as ‘insurance contracts with direct participation features’. That approach is referred to as the variable fee approach (‘VFA’). Under this approach, the CSM is adjusted also for changes in the measurement of financial risk to reflect that contractual fee is subject to such changes.

== History ==
IFRS 17 was issued by the International Accounting Standards Board (IASB) in May 2017. The International Accounting Standards Committee, the predecessor of the IASB initiated the project in 1992. It replaced the interim standard of 2004, IFRS 4, and had an effective date of 1 January 2023.

=== 2020 Amendments ===
On 26 June 2019, the IASB released an exposure draft proposing several amendments. Comments on the amendments were open for three months, closing on 25 September 2019. In total, 123 submissions were received. In June 2020 the IASB adopted the final set of amendments. The original effective date of IFRS 17 (2017) was 1 January 2021. In November 2018 the International Accounting Standards Board proposed to delay the effective date by one year to 1 January 2022. The 2020 Amendments finally deferred the effective date to 1 January 2023.

=== Adoption ===
In November 2021 EU adopted IFRS 17 with an exemption regarding the limitation of aggregating contracts for purposes of subsequent measurement of the contractual service margin, the so-called groups of insurance contracts; under IFRS 17 contracts may be only aggregated in groups which were issued not more than one year apart. This limitation is optional to be applied in the EU for contracts with specific participation features.

== Criticism ==
Several features of IFRS 17 have been criticized by preparers. One example is the volatility caused by applying current rates for time value of money. IFRS 17 permits presenting the effects of changes in the discount rate under Other Comprehensive Income to eliminate the volatility from the P&L.

Former IASB chairman Hans Hoogervorst regarded the use of a current discount rate as one of the benefits of the new standard, stating that by doing otherwise "the devastating impact of the current low-interest-rate environment on long-term obligations is not nearly as visible in the insurance industry as it is in the defined benefit pension schemes of many companies." He also stated that current discount rates would "increase comparability between insurance companies and between insurance and other parts of the financial industry, such as banks and asset management." Other benefits Hoogervorst saw in the new standard were increased consistency across companies in accounting for insurance contracts and a more theoretically valid measurement of revenue.
