= Artificial intelligence in insurance =

Use of artificial intelligence by insurers and its regulation

Artificial intelligence in insurance is the use of machine learning and other artificial intelligence (AI) techniques by insurance companies and intermediaries, for tasks such as underwriting, pricing, claims handling, fraud detection and customer service. Insurers have used statistical models to classify and price risks for decades, and actuaries adopted generalized linear models in the 1980s. Machine learning methods spread in the industry from the mid-2010s. Surveys by supervisors in the United States, the United Kingdom and the European Union found in the 2020s that most insurers were using or testing AI, with claims handling, fraud detection and marketing as the most common uses.

The use of AI by insurers has drawn the attention of regulators. The European Union's Artificial Intelligence Act classifies AI systems used for risk assessment and pricing of individuals in life and health insurance as high-risk. In the United States, where insurance is regulated by the states, the National Association of Insurance Commissioners (NAIC) adopted a model bulletin on insurers' use of AI in December 2023, and several states have passed laws on the use of AI in health insurance decisions. Criticism has focused on the risk that models reproduce discrimination through proxy variables, on the effect of individual pricing on risk pooling, and on lawsuits alleging that American health insurers used algorithms to deny claims.

== Applications ==
Surveys by insurance supervisors show AI in use across most of the insurance business, though unevenly. In a survey of 193 private passenger auto insurers reported in December 2022, the NAIC found that 88.6 per cent used, planned to use or planned to explore AI or machine learning. Claims was the most common area, with models in use at 70 per cent of companies, followed by marketing and fraud detection. The shares were lower for rating, at 27 per cent, and for underwriting, at 18 per cent. In later NAIC surveys, 70 per cent of homeowners insurers and 58 per cent of life insurers said they used AI or were interested in using it. Of 93 health insurers surveyed in 2025, 92 per cent used, planned to use or were exploring AI, most often in utilization management and claims adjudication.

In the United Kingdom, a survey by the Bank of England and the Financial Conduct Authority published in November 2024 found that insurance had the highest share of firms using AI of any sector, at 95 per cent, just ahead of international banks.

=== Claims handling ===
Among American auto insurers, claims is the area where AI is most widely used. In the NAIC survey, 96 companies used it to provide information to adjusters, 58 to assign claims, 55 to evaluate images and 50 to help set settlement amounts. Nine used it for claim approvals, and none reported using it to deny claims. In the NAIC's 2025 survey of health insurers, between five and nine companies, depending on the product line, used AI in decisions to deny prior authorization.

=== Fraud detection ===
Fraud detection was among the most common uses in the NAIC's auto survey, with models in use at 49 per cent of companies and under construction at another 9 per cent. In the Bank of England and FCA survey it was one of the three most frequent uses of AI across UK financial services, reported by 33 per cent of firms.

=== Customer service and generative AI ===
In a survey of 347 insurance undertakings in 25 European countries, published in February 2026, EIOPA found that nearly two thirds were using generative artificial intelligence, although most applications were still at the proof-of-concept stage. Of the use cases, 64 per cent concerned internal productivity, for example extracting data from invoices and medical reports or drafting emails and contracts, while 36 per cent were tools for customers, such as chatbots and voice assistants. Respondents named hallucinations as the main risk, ahead of cybersecurity and data protection. The share of insurers with a dedicated AI policy had risen from 25 per cent in 2023 to 49 per cent.
