= Nuclear exclusion clause =

Insurance contract clause

The nuclear exclusion clause is a clause which excludes damage caused by nuclear and radiation accidents from regular insurance policies of, for example, home owners.

Example: Notwithstanding anything to the contrary herein, it is hereby understood and agreed that this policy shall not apply to any loss, damage or expense due to or arising out of, directly or indirectly, nuclear reaction, radiation or radioactive contamination regardless of how it was caused.

As operators of nuclear power plants often have limited third-party liability, in the case of a nuclear accident it is possible that private property damage would be covered neither by the operator of the nuclear power plant nor by the property owners' insurance.

There is no nuclear exclusion clause in health insurance policies.

== See also ==
- Terrorism insurance
- Contract adjustment board
- Public Law 85-804
- Price-Anderson Nuclear Industries Indemnity Act
