= Higginbotham =

Higginbotham is an English surname. Notable people with the surname include:

- Abraham Higginbotham, American screenwriter
- Adam Higginbotham, British journalist
- Andy Higginbotham, English footballer
- Antony Higginbotham (born 1989), British politician
- Charles Higginbotham, British soldier and cricketer
- Danny Higginbotham, Gibraltar footballer
- Don Higginbotham, historian
- Elizabeth Higginbotham, American sociologist of race, gender, and class
- Elwood Higginbotham, 1935 lynching victim
- Ernest Higginbotham, English footballer
- Eve Higginbotham, American ophthalmologist
- Evelyn Brooks Higginbotham, professor of African-American studies, African-American Religion and the Victor S. Thomas Professor of History at Harvard University
- Fred Higginbotham, ice hockey player
- G. J. Higginbotham, American politician from Alabama
- Grady Higginbotham, college coach of baseball, basketball, and football at Texas Tech
- Harry Higginbotham, Australian footballer
- Henry Higginbotham, artist
- Irene Higginbotham, songwriter and concert pianist
- Irv Higginbotham, baseball player
- J. C. Higginbotham, jazz trombonist
- James Higginbotham, American professor of linguistics and philosophy
- James Higginbotham, birth name of English chemist and alchemist James Price
- Joan Higginbotham, astronaut
- Joshua Higginbotham, American politician from West Virginia
- Kallum Higginbotham, English footballer
- A. Leon Higginbotham Jr., United States Appellate Court judge
- Mitchell Higginbotham, American pilot and Tuskegee airman
- Morris Higginbotham, American football coach
- Patrick Higginbotham, United States Appellate Court judge
- Paul B. Higginbotham, Wisconsin state court judge
- Robert Higginbotham, birth name of singer Tommy Tucker
- Scott Higginbotham, Australian rugby union player
- Shorpy Higginbotham, child coal miner, namesake of Shorpy.com
- Susan Higginbotham, author
- Tegan Higginbotham, Australian actress and comedian

== See also ==
- Higginbotham Insurance & Financial Services, an independent insurance brokerage firm founded in 1948.
- Higginbotham's, a company of book sellers and publishers in India.
- Malcolmson and Higginbotham, former Detroit architectural firm
- William E. Higginbotham Elementary School, formerly in Detroit.
