= Ikard =

Ikard is a surname. Notable people with the surname include:

- Bose Ikard (ca. 1840s–1929), African-American cowboy
- Frank N. Ikard (1913–1991), American politician
- Gabe Ikard (born 1990), American football player
- William S. Ikard (1847–1934), American cattle rancher

== See also ==
- List of Beast Wars II: Super Life-Form Transformers characters#Maximals
