= Hex Rally =

Student rally held in support of Longhorns football team against Aggies

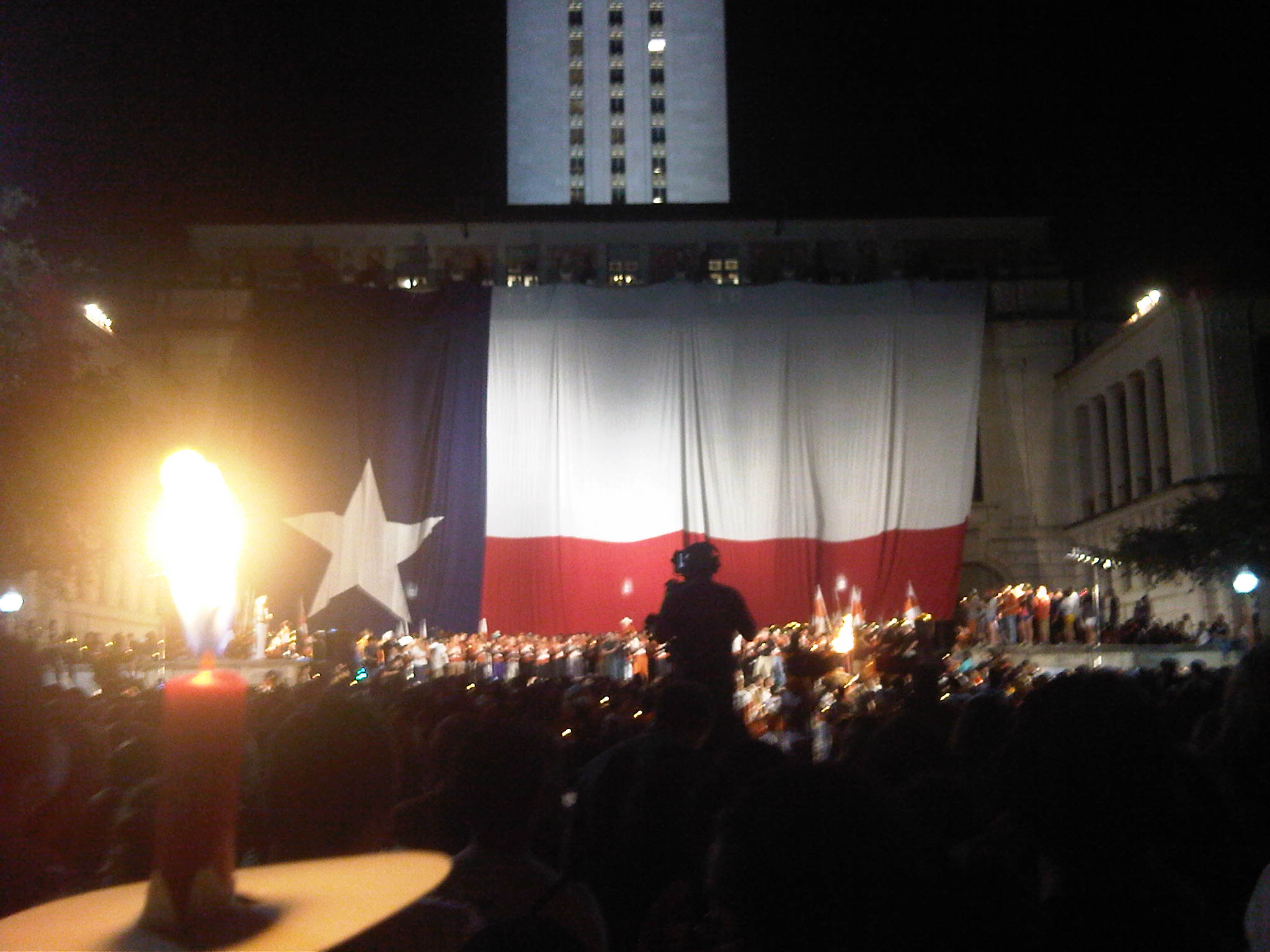
Holding a red candle at the 2011 hex rally in front of the tower and Texas flag.

Hex Rally (sometimes Texas Hex) is a pep rally at The University of Texas at Austin that occurs in the week before the annual football game between the Texas Longhorns and their in-state rivals, the Texas A&M Aggies.

== History ==
The Hex Rally traces its origins to 1941. Having lost the previous seven away games at Texas A&M, a group of worried UT students sought the advice of a local fortune teller, Mozzelle "Madame Augusta" Hipple.

Hipple told the students to burn red candles the week before the game against A&M. The red symbolized challenge and opposition. In response, store owners, dorm residents, and other UT supporters around Austin burned red candles ceaselessly. That Thanksgiving, the Texas Longhorns snapped A&M's home winning streak with a 23–0 win.

The rally has been held annually, except in 2002 after the death of Texas A&M football player Brandon Fails, and 1999 when the rally's tone was altered in response to the tragedy of the Aggie bonfire collapse; organizers extended an invitation to all Aggies and their friends to the event, which was dubbed a "Unity Gathering." Instead of red candles, participants lit white candles in memory of the fallen Aggies.

As of 2025, UT and the "Texas Hexes" have continued the Hex Rally tradition, per the Daily Texan. The Texas Fight Rally, held the week before UT's annual game with the Oklahoma Sooners, remains as UT's primary annual football pep rally.

== Rally ==
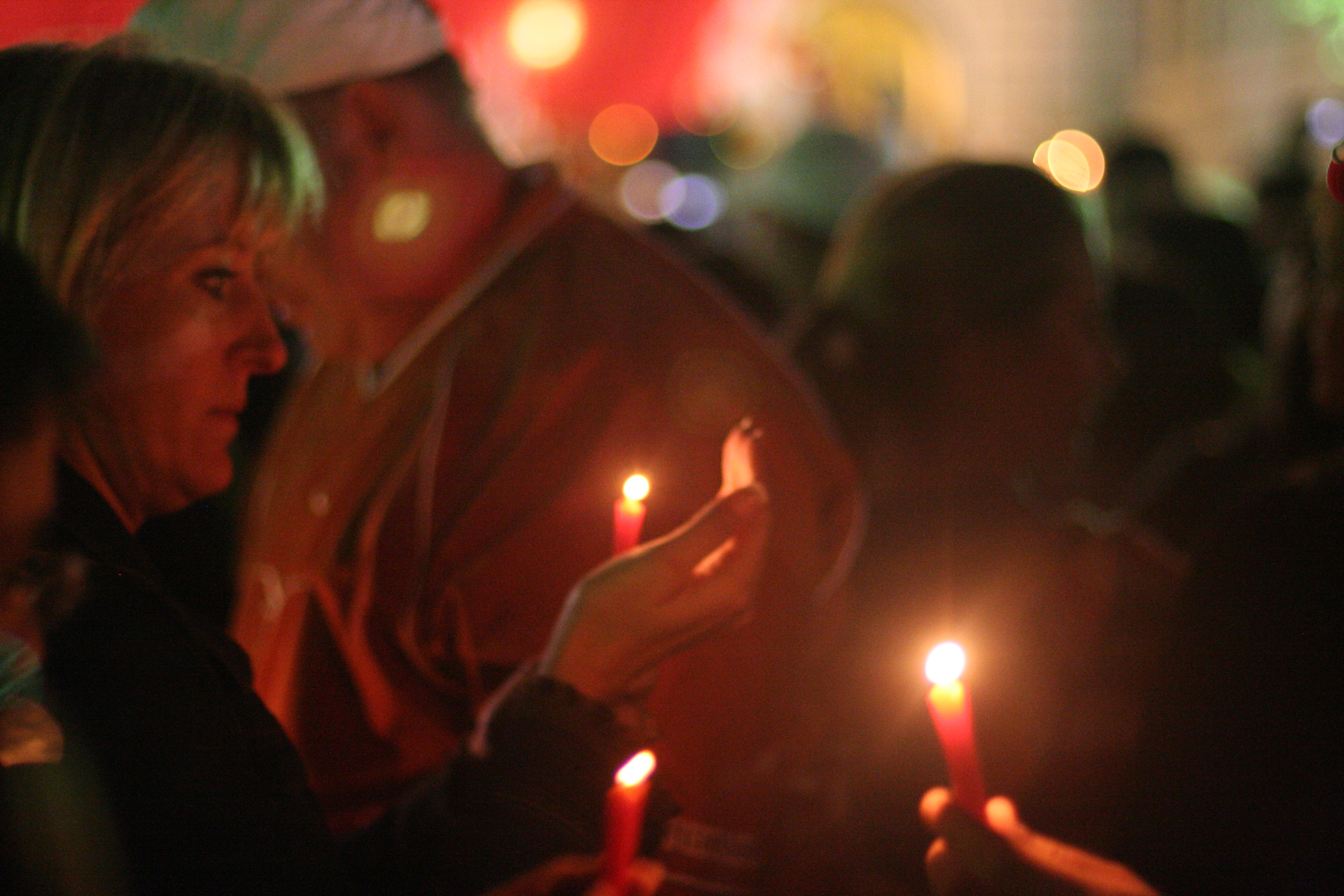
Fans light red candles at the 2008 Texas Hex rally.

The Texas Exes Student Chapter, sponsored by the Texas Exes alumni organization, organized the event. The Longhorn Band, cheerleading squad, Smokey the Cannon, the World's Largest Texas Flag, and football team all appeared at the event, where red candles were burned.

As part of their rituals, UT held a bonfire similar in structure to the Aggie Bonfire. However, there was not sufficient lumber to build one as large, and student interest was lacking. UT Bonfire eventually died out in the mid-1980s. The physics department at the university decided to build an iron candle-like torch as a replacement, which was lit each year at the rally.

The 2008 rally, held November 24, 2008, featured Longhorn football head coach Mack Brown, strength and conditioning coach, Jeff "Mad Dog" Madden, and the Longhorn Football Team.
