= Higinbotham =

Higinbotham may refer to:

== People ==
- George Higinbotham (1826–1892), politician
- Harlow Niles Higinbotham (1838-1919), president of the World's Columbian Exposition
- Nathaniel Higinbotham (1830–1911), politician
- Thomas Higinbotham (1819–1880), engineer and civil servant
- William Higinbotham (1910–1994), physicist and video game pioneer

== Places ==
- Division of Higinbotham
- Higinbotham Province

== See also ==
- Higginbotham
- Higginbottom
