= Hickinbotham =

Hickinbotham is a surname. Notable people with the surname include:

- Alan Hickinbotham (1925–2010), Australian rules footballer and businessman
- David Hickinbotham (1862–1941), Australian rules footballer
- Hickinbotham Brothers Shipbuilders, California shipbuilder
- Hickinbotham Oval, in Adelaide

== See also ==
- Higginbotham, surname
