= Multiple-peril insurance =

Type of insurance

Multiple-peril insurance coverage is a kind of insurance that bundles together multiple coverages that typically would be needed with each other. Typically the package may include coverage for business crime, business automobile, boiler and machinery, marine, or farm. The benefits to purchasing multiple-peril insurance coverage include lower overall premium costs for the insured because of the benefits that the insured receives on the basis of an all-in-one type package, as well as broader coverage for losses that typically occur together, like flood damage to an insured's basement and wind damage to an insured's roof.

== Commercial multiple-peril insurance coverage ==
The term multiple-peril coverage is rarely used in commercial insurance. Rather, most insurance companies offer package plans like a Business Owners Policy (BOP) which covers a variety of risks that face a typical small business. However, multiple-peril coverage is a broader, more inclusive term that includes coverage combinations like business automobile, which is a single category of coverage, but actually qualifies as multiple-peril coverage as it may provide indemnification for the perils of liability, physical damage (property), and medical payments.

=== Multiple-peril crop insurance coverage ===
A prominent type of multiple-peril insurance coverage is multiple-peril crop insurance coverage (MPCI). MPCI is a bundle of different policy options that covers loss of crop yields from drought, flood, excessive moisture, and all other natural causes. Recent changes in coverage now allow for a combination of yield protection and price protection to further protect farmers from financial loss. Multiple-peril crop insurance is actually a product of a government partnership and 19 private insurance companies. In essence, the United States Department of Agriculture Risk Management Agency oversees the issuance of MPCI, along with mandating what rates can be charged and what kinds of crops are automatically covered in different parts of the country. The collection of private insurance companies that are allowed to sell MPCI handle the reinsurance and writing of the policies themselves, as well as adjusting and processing claims.

== USA Multiple-peril Insurance Act ==
Currently the government is the only actual provider of flood insurance throughout the nation as part of the National Flood Insurance Program. In 2009, a bill approached the House of Representatives that would have extended the National Flood Insurance Program to include other risks typically associated with catastrophic flooding. This bill was entitled the Multiple-Peril Insurance Act and was sponsored by Representative Gene Taylor of Mississippi. The provisions of this bill would have extended the federal government's involvement in the flood insurance to combine the current sale of flood insurance through the NFIP with wind coverage. As a result, those who experienced damage from a catastrophe like a large-scale hurricane would know that they could not fall through a crack in their coverage. However, others argued that the bill was unnecessarily subsidizing the purchase of wind insurance when such insurance is already available in 99% of ZIP codes in the United States. A bundle of wind and flood insurance is the perfect illustration of multiple-peril insurance coverage. Even though the combination of the two kinds of coverage seems logical, the current structure of the flood insurance market makes this bundle impossible to sell because of regulatory issues.

== Unusual Multiple-peril Insurance Policies ==
Sometimes multiple-peril insurance policies bundle some fairly strange coverages together for the sake of covering all possible risks to an insured. For example, some life insurance policies come complete with UFO abduction coverage. Although this may seem strange, in the case of a UFO abduction where it may be fairly difficult to determine whether an individual is dead or alive, the life insurance policy would pay benefits to the insured's designated recipient indefinitely or until the insured was returned. Additionally, many employers that have life insurance policies on their top employees often buy a multiple-peril version of the policy that includes kidnapping insurance that will pay ransom in the event of the employees kidnapping that results in an indefinite holding of the employee that may or may not result in death, particularly when it may be difficult to confirm the life status of the employee.
