= Darrell K Royal–Texas Memorial Stadium =

Stadium at the University of Texas

Darrell K Royal–Texas Memorial Stadium at Campbell-Williams Field
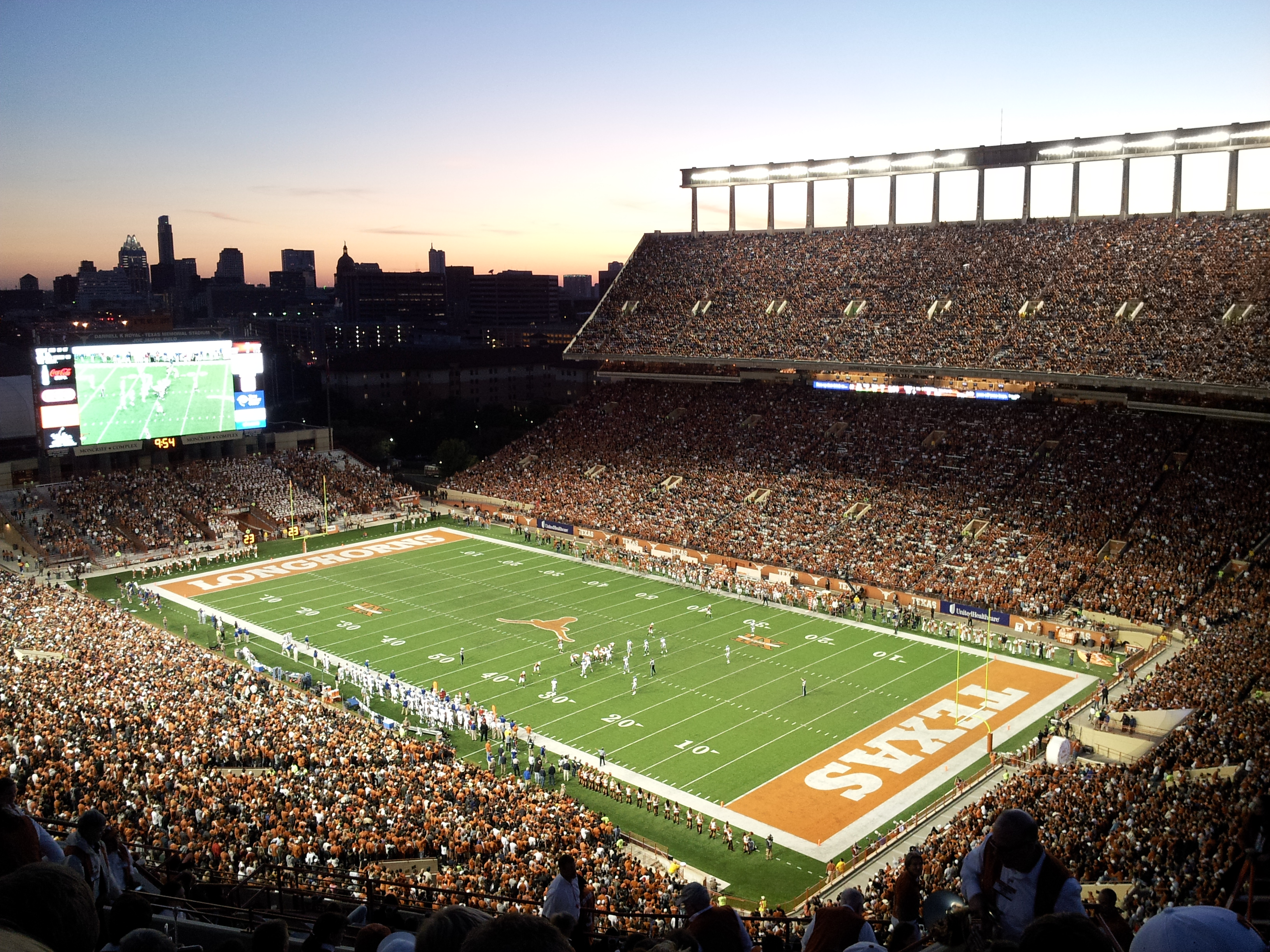
- The stadium on the night of October 29, 2011
- Interactive map of Darrell K Royal–Texas Memorial Stadium at Campbell-Williams Field
- Former names: War Memorial Stadium (1924–1947); Memorial Stadium (1948–1976); Texas Memorial Stadium (1977–1995)
- Location: 405 East 23rd Street; Austin, Texas 78712
- Coordinates: 30.28367°N 97.73256°W
- Owner: University of Texas
- Operator: University of Texas
- Capacity: 100,119
- Surface: FieldTurf (2009–present); Natural grass (1996–2008); Artificial turf (1969–1995); Natural grass (1924–1968)
- Record attendance: 105,215 (Georgia Bulldogs vs. Texas Longhorns, October 19, 2024)

Construction
- Groundbreaking: April 4, 1924
- Opened: November 8, 1924 (first game); November 27, 1924 (dedication)
- Renovated: 1955, 1977, 1986, 1996, 2002, 2005, 2011, 2013
- Expanded: 1926, 1948, 1964, 1968, 1971, 1997–1999, 2006–2009, 2019–2021
- Cost: US$275,000 ($5.17 million in 2025 dollars); North End zone Expansion US$149.9 Million; South End zone Expansion US$200 Million
- Architect: Herbert M. Greene
- General contractors: Walsh and Burney

Tenant
- Texas Longhorns (NCAA) (1924–present)

Website
- texassports.com/texasmemorialstadium

Darrell K Royal–Texas Memorial Stadium (formerly War Memorial Stadium, Memorial Stadium, and Texas Memorial Stadium), located in Austin, Texas, on the campus of the University of Texas at Austin, has been home to the Longhorns football team since 1924. The stadium has delivered a home field advantage with the team's home record through December 21, 2024 being 406–123–10 (.763). The official stadium seating capacity is 100,119, making the stadium the fourth largest in the Southeastern Conference, the seventh largest stadium in the United States, and the ninth largest stadium in the world.

The DKR–Texas Memorial Stadium attendance record of 105,215 spectators was set on October 19, 2024, when Texas played the University of Georgia Bulldogs.

== History ==
=== Memorial dedication ===
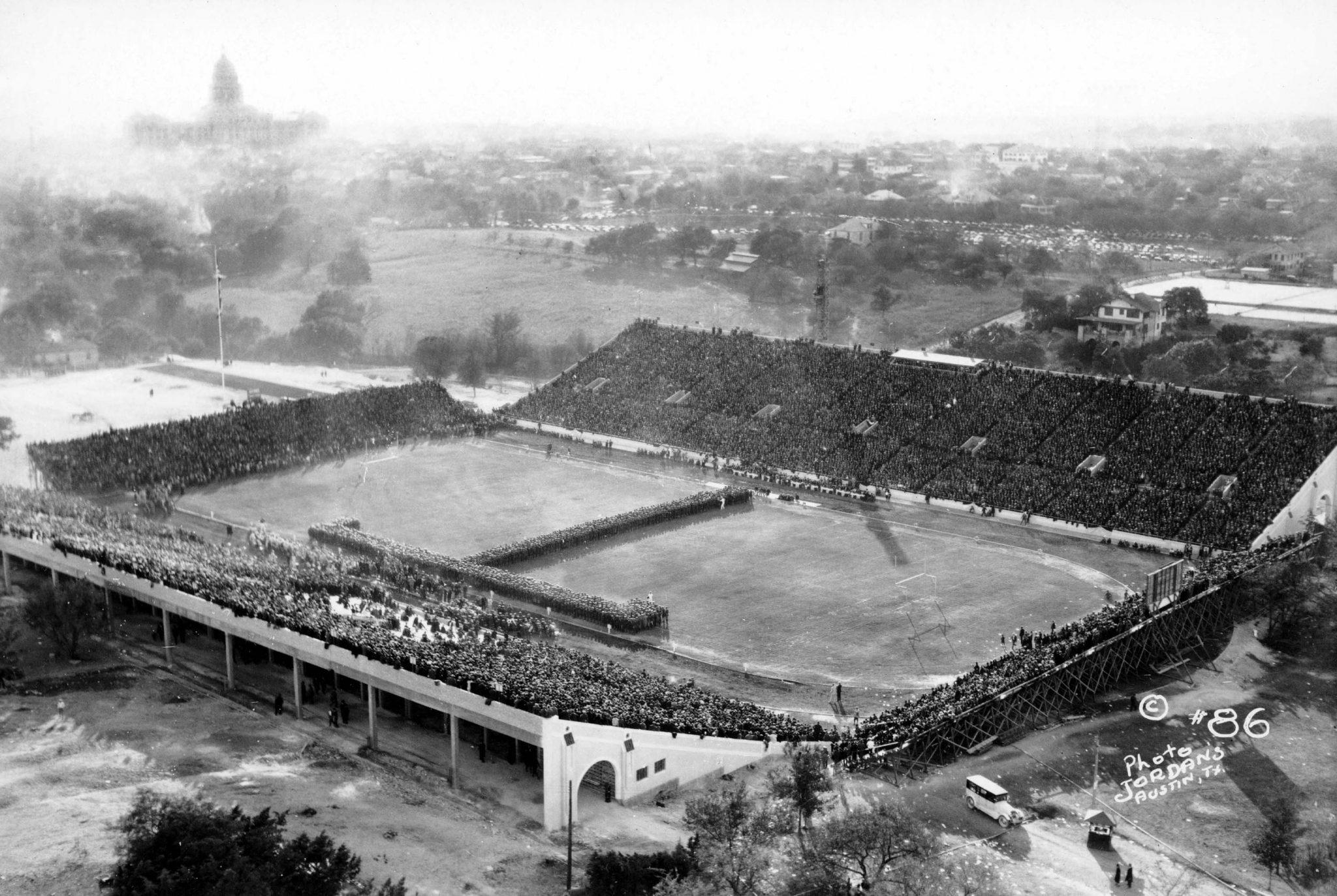
War Memorial Stadium dedication game vs Texas A&M, 1924

In 1923, former UT athletics director L. Theo Bellmont (in whose honor the west side of the stadium is named), along with 30 student leaders, presented the idea to the board of regents of building a concrete stadium to replace the wooden bleachers of Clark Field. Heralded as "the largest sports facility of its kind in the Southwest" upon its completion in 1924, it seated 27,000 people in the lower level of the current facility's east and west grandstands. It was designed as a dual-purpose facility with a 440-yard (400 m) athletics track surrounding the football field. The stadium was financed through donations from both students and alumni. The estimated cost of the structure was $275,000.

The student body dedicated the stadium in honor of the 198,520 Texans—5,280 of whom died—who fought in World War I. A statue, representing the figure of democracy, was later placed atop the north end zone seats of the stadium. In World War II, the university lost many former players, including former coach Jack Chevigny. The Athletics Council rededicated the newly enlarged stadium on September 18, 1948, prior to the Texas-LSU game, honoring the men and women who had died in the war. On November 12, 1977, a small granite monument was unveiled and placed at the base of the statue, during the TCU-Texas game. The ceremony rededicated Texas Memorial Stadium to the memory of all alumni in all American wars.

The University of Texas honored legendary football coach Darrell K Royal, who enlisted in the US Army Air Corps in 1943, played at the University of Oklahoma under legendary Coach Bud Wilkinson, and who led Texas to three national championships and eleven Southwest Conference titles, by officially naming the stadium after him in 1996. Additionally, the university established the Royal-Texas Memorial Stadium Veterans Committee, composed of alumni who served in World War II, Korea, Vietnam, or the Gulf Wars. The committee is charged to forever dedicate the stadium in the memory of, and in honor of, UT students and alumni who gave their lives for their country. Each year, one home football game is designated as Veterans Recognition Day, commemorating the memorial aspect of the stadium and to honor the memory of war soldiers.

=== Renovations and expansions ===
The stadium has been expanded several times since its original opening.

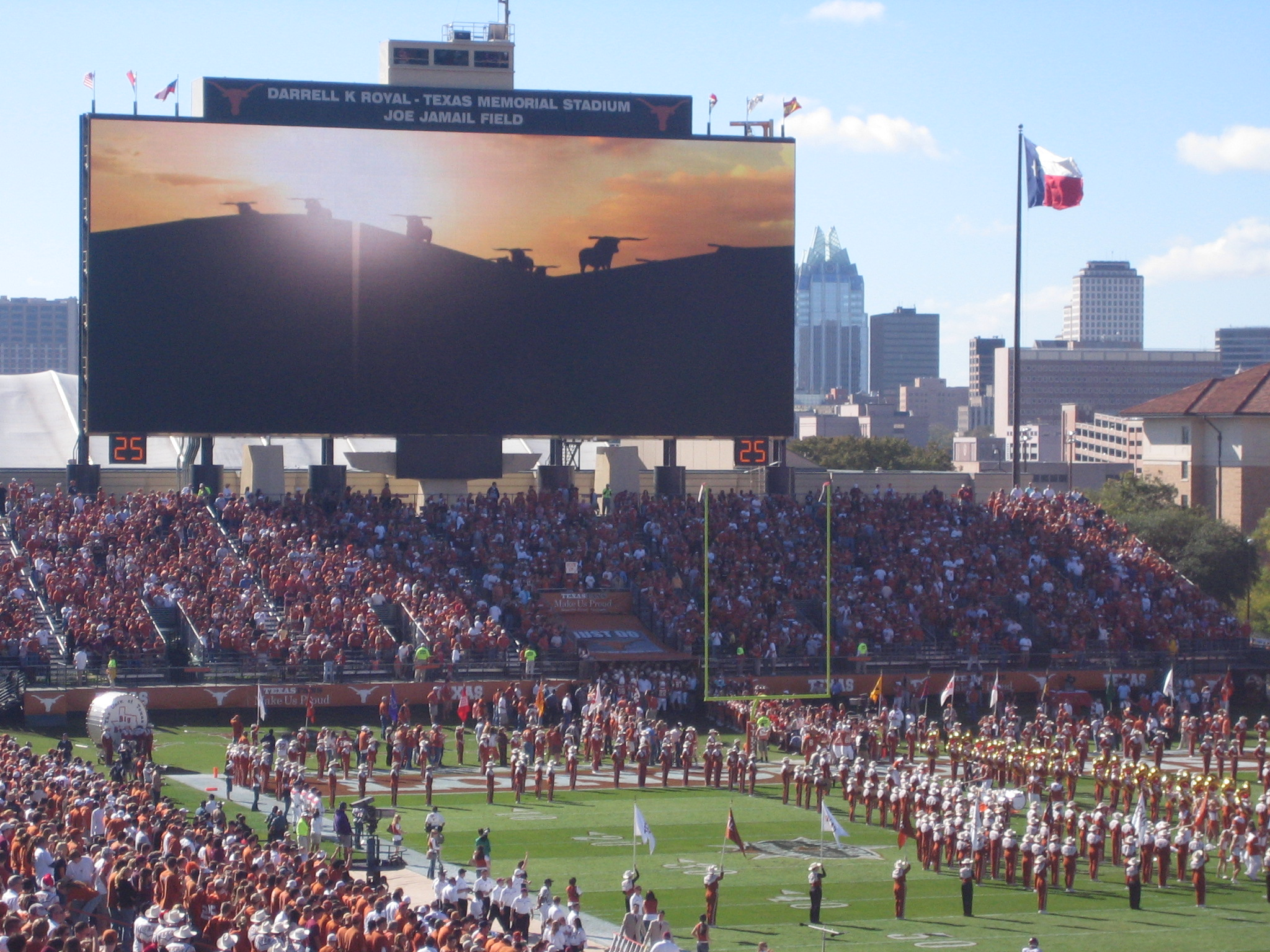
Previous video board and south end seating as seen from the old north end in 2006

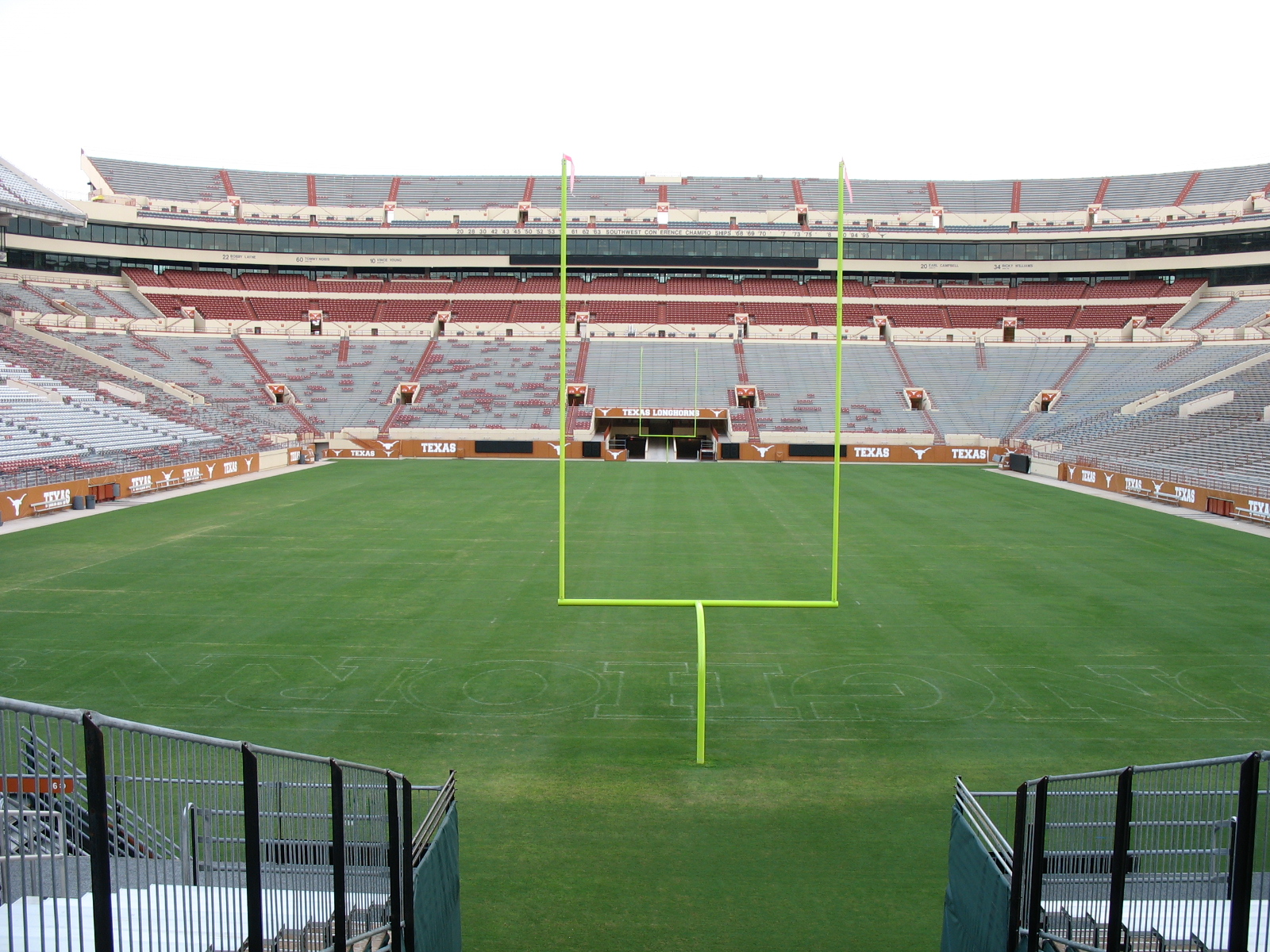
The north end zone after stadium expansion (before the 2008 season)

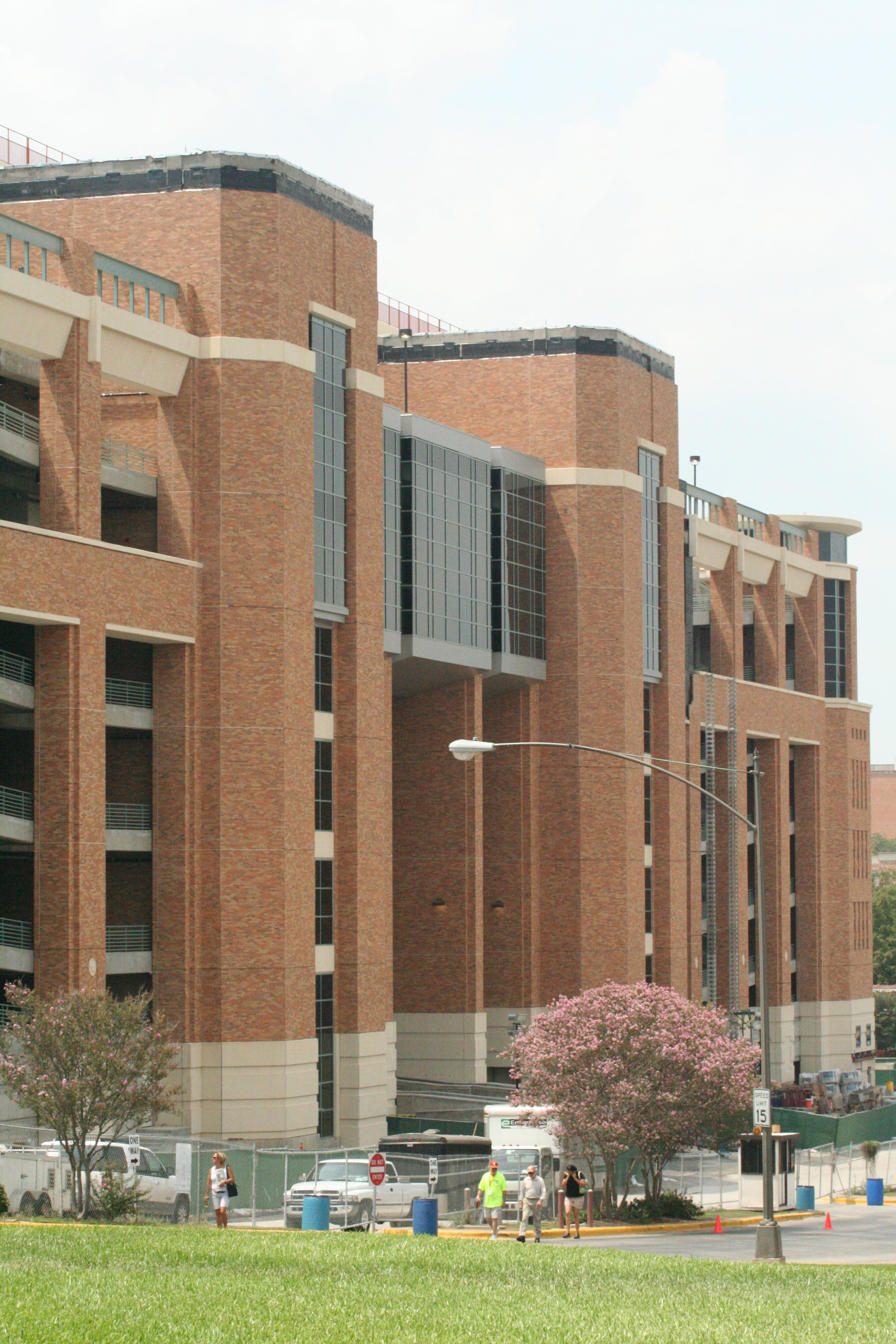
Exterior facade of the new north end zone seating during construction

- 1926 – North end enclosed for US$125,000, turning stadium into "horseshoe" and raising capacity to 40,500.
- 1948 – 26 rows were added to the east and west stands. Additionally, a section was added to the south end of the east and west stands. Capacity was raised to 60,136 at a cost of $1.4 million. General contractor for this work was Farnsworth & Chambers Inc. of Houston.
- 1955 – 8 100-foot Light towers were added at a cost of $200,000. First night game occurred on September 17, 1955.
- 1964 – Minor seating expansion added 780 seats, bringing capacity to 60,916.
- 1968 – Seating expansion added 5,481 seats, bringing capacity to 66,397.
- 1969 – Artificial turf, a tartan track and aluminium seats were installed. First game on turf occurred September 27, 1969
- 1971 – Upper deck added to the west side adding 15,990 seats, raising seating capacity to 77,809; General contractor for this work was a joint venture of two companies: Darragh & Lyda Inc. of San Antonio and H. A. Lott, Inc. of Houston.
- 1977 – Track converted from 440 yards to 400 meters (437.4 yds.).
- 1986 – The Vernon F. "Doc" Neuhaus–Darrell K Royal Athletic Center completed at the south end of the stadium at a cost of $7 million; the center was later renamed the W. A. "Tex" Moncrief, Jr.–V. F. "Doc" Neuhaus Athletic Center in 1997 after Royal's name was added to the stadium.
- 1989 – New four-color animated scoreboard was installed at the north end of the stadium
- 1996 – Replacement of the stadium's artificial turf with natural grass (Prescription Athletic Turf) at a cost of $1.25 million; installation of a Jumbotron video system; scoreboards retrofitted at a cost of $2.8 million. Stadium renamed Darrell K Royal–Texas Memorial Stadium to honor former head coach Darrell K Royal.
- 1997 – 14 stadium suites added to west side; underside of the stands remodeled, adding a concession plaza and visitors' locker room. In recognition of UT law school alumnus and benefactor Joe Jamail, the university named the football playing field Joe Jamail Field. Stadium capacity reduced by 2,297 seats, bringing capacity to 75,512.
- 1998 – Upper deck added to the east side including 52 new stadium suites and a 13,000-square-foot (1,200 m^{2}) private club room. A total of 3,959 seats were added, bringing capacity to 79,471.
- 1999 – Track removed; new seats added to the west grandstand and the field was lowered seven feet to accommodate new front-row and field-level seats on the east and west grandstands, bringing capacity to 80,082.
- 2002 – TifSport Certified Bermuda grass replaced Prescription Athletic Turf. Cost $75,000
- 2005 – Bellmont Hall, located in the west side of the stadium, was upgraded to meet newer safety codes set by the Austin Fire Department, the upper deck structure received new water sealing, and the Centennial Room and eighth-floor press box were expanded at a cost of $15 million.
- 2006 – A 7,370-square-foot (685 m^{2}) HD Daktronics LED scoreboard, nicknamed "Godzillatron", located in the south end zone, was installed as the centerpiece of $8 million worth of audio/visual improvements. At the time of its creation, it was called the largest HD video screen in the world, though it was quickly surpassed by a larger screen in Tokyo. The six large flag poles that previously displayed the Six Flags Over Texas were replaced by smaller flags located atop the new screen. The sound system was also updated and smaller video boards were installed on the east and west sides of the stadium. 432 club seats were added to the west side and approximately 4,000 bleacher seats were added behind the south end zone expanding official seating capacity to 85,123. Previously, two scoreboards were in place, one in the south end, the Freddie Steinmark Memorial Scoreboard and Jumbotron, and one in the north end, a video matrix screen. Both were removed after the 2005 season. The new scoreboard replaced the one in the south end. The north end no longer features a scoreboard as it was removed for the 2008 stadium expansion, the giant Longhorn symbol at the very top was sold on eBay. On November 8, 2015, the UT Longhorns rededicated the scoreboard to Freddie Steinmark in a ceremony attended by many previous Longhorn players.
- 2007–2008 – An expansion project costing US$149.9 million gave the stadium a new memorial plaza and new multi-level north end zone structure. The new outdoor plaza at the northwest corner is a memorial to veterans, with (the original 1924) bronze tablet honoring Texas World War I deaths, and a monument. The expansion included additional seats with an upper deck, club space, suites, athletic offices, academic-advising areas and a basement with gym space. Demolition of the old north end zone began on December 8, 2006, to move seating closer to the field. The south end zone also became the new seating location of the Longhorn Band beginning in 2008. Overall, the stadium's official seating capacity increased to 94,113.
- 2009 – A $27 million project brought a new Football Academic Center, a new Hall of Fame, FieldTurf replaced the TifSport Certified Bermuda grass, and replaced the 4,000 south end temporary bleachers with the addition of 4,525 permanent bleacher seats bringing capacity to 100,119.
- 2011 – Player locker room renovated with 135 new wide-space lockers connected to a state-of-the-art exhaust system, nutrition bar, lounge area with gaming stations, six large LED screens, and a new sound system and speakers.
- 2013 – FieldTurf installed in 2009 replaced in April 2013 to improve drainage and change the orange in the end zones to more of a "burnt orange".
- 2013 – A $62 million project that will add a practice facility for the women's volleyball team in the basement of the north end zone as well as additional athletic offices. Bellmont Hall will receive facility improvements and become an academic center for kinesiology, health education and fine arts.
- 2017 – Extensive upgrades to the locker room, weight room and meeting rooms. New LED video board in South End zone, ribbon boards and new sound system. West-side facade undergoes restoration and reinforcement.
- 2019–2021 – The final planned phase of the stadium's expansion includes construction of permanent seating in the south end zone, completely enclosing the playing field. Plans include club seating, luxury suites, and new video board. This plan has been part of the university's master plan since at least the early 1990s, as renderings and models of a fully enclosed stadium have existed since that time. On September 20, 2018, the university announced that it will spend $175 million on the south end zone project with most of the funds coming from donations. The south end zone will not mirror the north end zone and seating capacity has not been announced. On May 4, 2019, ground was broken on the "south-end zone expansion project". "The new addition opened in time for the 2021 football season."
- 2020 – In response to calls for increased diversity at the university and at the suggestion of the Jamail family, interim president Jay Hartzell announced that the field, previously named for Joe Jamail, would be renamed to honor Heisman Trophy winners Earl Campbell and Ricky Williams. Hartzell also announced that a statue of Julius Whittier, the school's first Black football letterman, would be erected at the stadium.
- 2021 – New FieldTurf surface installed in time for the 2021 season at a cost of $429,906.
- 2023–2024 - The stadium's lighting system is upgraded to an instant-start multi-color LED system.

== Attendance record ==
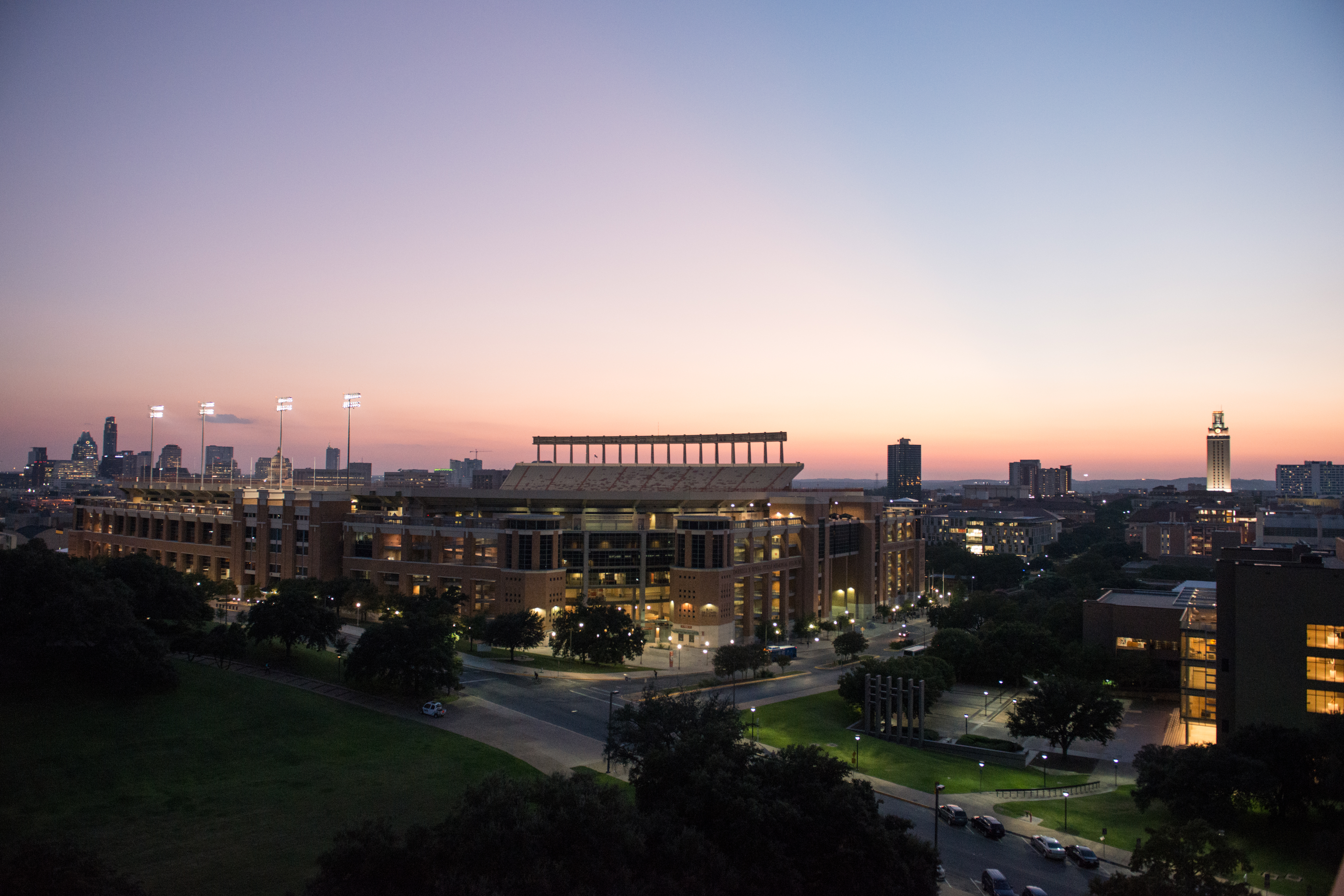
View from the LBJ Presidential Library

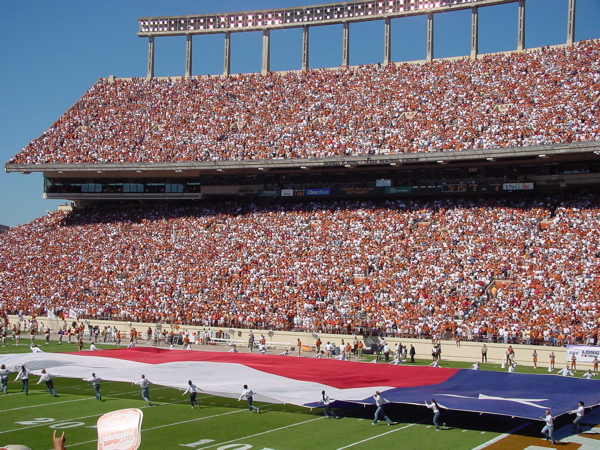
The World's Largest Texas Flag during a pre-game flag run

Rank	Date	Opponent	Attendance	Score
1	October 19, 2024	#5 Georgia	105,215	L 15-30
2	September 10, 2022	#1 Alabama	105,213	L 19-20
3	September 13, 2026	#1 Ohio State	105,044	W 24-23
4	October 24, 2026	#7 Ole Miss	104,306	W 34-27
5	November 12, 2022	#4 TCU	104,203	L 10-17
6	October 17, 2026	Florida	103,989	L 24-27
7	September 19, 2026	UTSA	103,753	W 30-6
8	November 28, 2025	#3 Texas A&M	103,632	W 27-17
9	October 31, 2026	Mississippi State	103,586	W 31-3
10	September 15, 2018	#22 USC	103,507	W 37-14
11	November 9, 2024	Florida	103,375	W 49-17
12	September 20, 2025	Sam Houston	103,003	W 55-0
13	September 30, 2023	#24 Kansas	102,986	W 40-14
14	September 21, 2024	Louisiana–Monroe	102,850	W 51-3
15	November 23, 2024	Kentucky	102,811	W 31-14
16	September 5, 2026	Texas State	102,738	W 59-7
17	September 17, 2022	UTSA	102,520	W 41-20
18	November 17, 2018	#18 Iowa State	102,498	W 24-10
19	November 24, 2023	Texas Tech	102,452	W 57-7
20	November 22, 2025	Arkansas	102,361	W 52-37

== History of capacity changes ==
- 27,000 (1924–1925)
- 40,500 (1926–1947)
- 60,136 (1948–1963)
- 60,916 (1964–1967)
- 66,397 (1968–1970)
- 77,809 (1971–1996)
- 75,512 (1997)
- 79,471 (1998)
- 80,092 (1999–2005)
- 85,123 (2006–2007)
- 94,113 (2008)
- 100,119 (2009–2018, 2021–present)
- 95,594 (2019–2020) South End Zone seating removed for expansion project

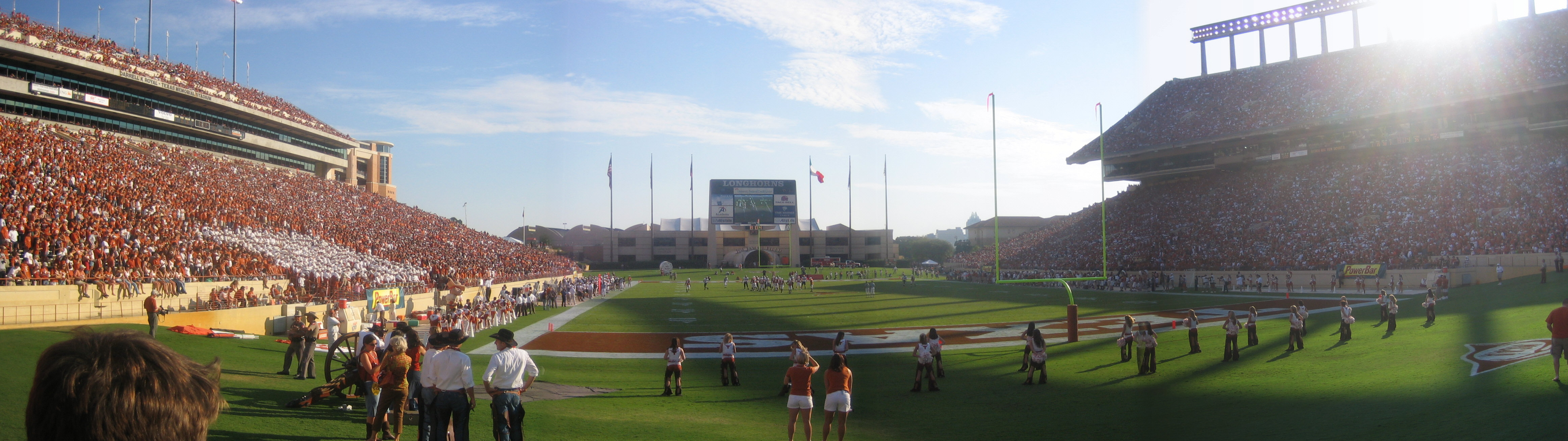
A panorama of the game between Texas and Colorado on October 15, 2005; Texas won 42–17.
Smokey the Cannon (lower left) is in the eastern section of the north end zone. The 2007 expansion brought the seats closer to the field so the cannon was relocated to the southeastern corner of the stadium.

== See also ==
- List of NCAA Division I FBS football stadiums
- Lists of stadiums
