= Fort Worth Stock Show & Rodeo =

Agricultural show and rodeo held in Fort Worth, US

Coordinates: 32.7444°N 97.3670°W

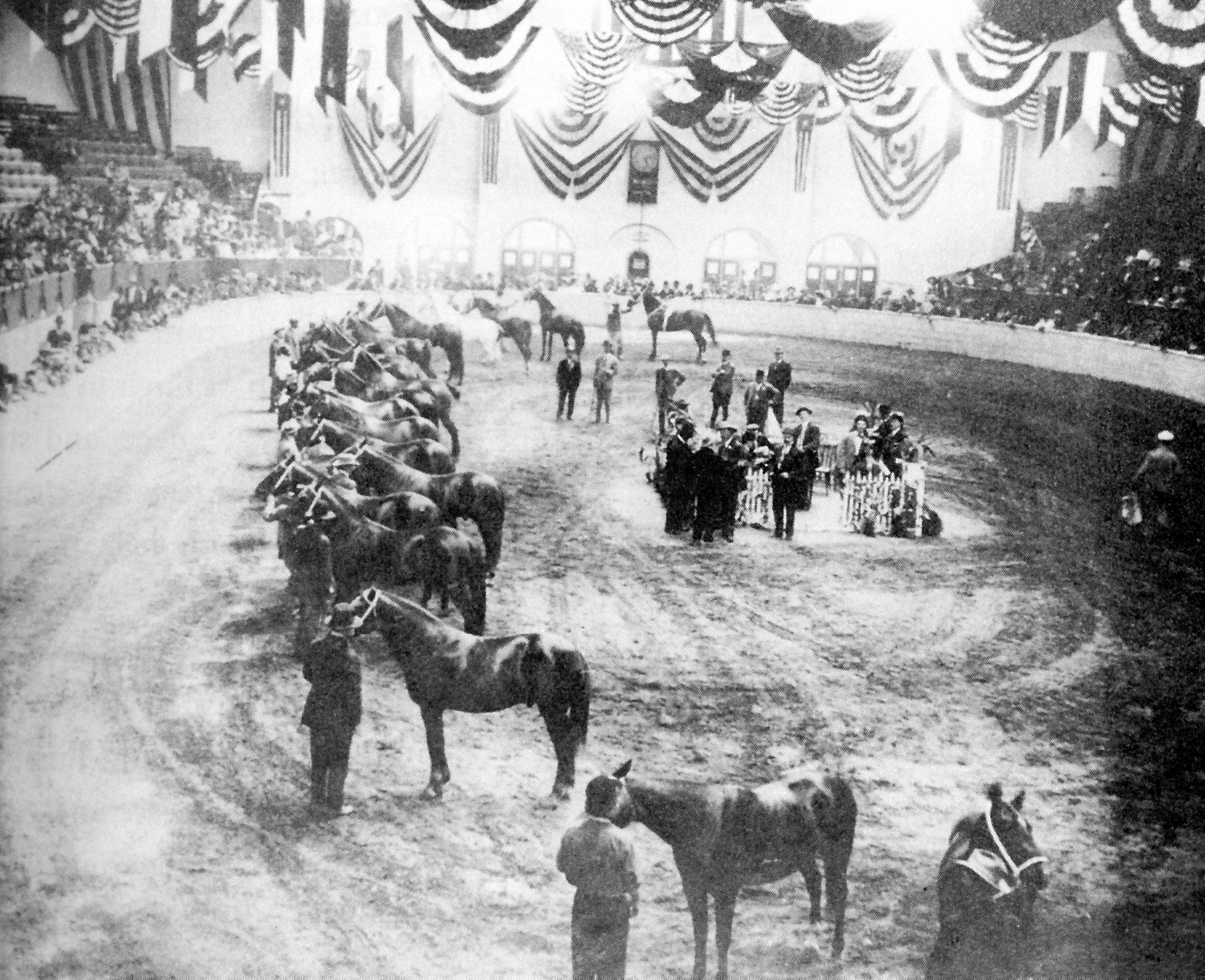
- Halter class at the 1908 show
- Genre: Livestock show and rodeo
- Frequency: Annually
- Venue: Will Rogers Memorial Center; Ariat Arena; Fort Worth, Texas
- Country: United States
- Years active: 129
- Inaugurated: October 12, 1896
- Attendance: 0 (2021)
- Website: fwssr.com

The Fort Worth Stock Show & Rodeo (formally the Southwestern Exposition and Livestock Show) is the oldest continuously running livestock show and rodeo. It has been held annually in Fort Worth, Texas, since 1896, traditionally in mid-January through early February. A non-profit organization, the Stock Show has provided millions of dollars in grants and scholarships in its tenure and continues to provide hundreds of thousands of dollars annually to assist the future leaders of agriculture and livestock management.

== History ==
The city of Fort Worth was nicknamed "Cowtown" shortly after the Civil War, as cowboys stopped for supplies in the town while herding their cattle from South Texas to the Chisholm Trail. After the arrival of the Texas and Pacific Railway in 1876, various business people in the town began erecting stock yards in an effort to become a greater part of the cattle industry. In 1883, the Fort Worth Stockyards were officially incorporated.

Local ranchers wished to encourage interest in their cattle. A conversation between rancher Charles McFarland and Charles French, marketing manager for the Fort Worth Stock Yards, resulted in the first area stock show in 1896. This event was the first of what would eventually become known as the Southwestern Exposition and Livestock Show. The stock show was held along Marine Creek, in a location with no buildings or enclosures, and only a few trees to provide shade for the animals and patrons. Early–day cattle exhibitors and organizers were all Texans: Capt. William S. Ikard of Henrietta, a breeder of Herefords; I. K. Kimberlin of Sherman; Col. J. W. Burgess of Fort Worth, a Shorthorn breeder, and Col. B. C. Rhome of Denton and Wise Counties. These men were joined by operators of the Fort Worth Stock Yards Company, which was organized in 1893; Armour & Company and Swift & Company, meat packers; and officials of the various railway companies serving Fort Worth.

That first show was such a success that organizers gathered again in the fall of 1896 for a two-day event in October to coincide with the National Livestock Exchange Convention meeting. A parade opened the fall show. Most exhibitors preferred the spring dates, so the Show was established as a March event, to fit in with a series of major livestock shows held around the country, establishing a regular circuit for exhibitor herds.

The following year, the event was given a name, the Texas Fat Stock Show. Tents were erected for the animals, and visitors were charged a twenty-five cent fee to view the livestock.

Local ranchers promoted the show to northern meat packers in the hopes of improving the local livestock industry. The citizens of Fort Worth raised $50,000 and formed a company in 1904 to oversee the event. Under the group's second president, Samuel Burk Burnett, the annual show was renamed the Southwestern Exposition and Fat Stock Show. During his term, which lasted from 1908 to 1922, the event dramatically expanded. The North Side Coliseum (now called Cowtown Coliseum) was built in 1908 to house the event. The new indoor judging arena expanded interest in the Stock Show, and a carnival and midway were soon added. Commercial exhibit displays also increased in number, and exhibitors travelled from several surrounding states to participate.

== Rodeo ==
A local newspaper editor, Ray McKinley, suggested in 1917 that the event incorporate a competition among cowboys and cowgirls. Stock Show president Marion Sansom appointed a committee of seven men, including Buck Sansom, Bob Tadlock, W.O. Rominger (Bill), Wade Ross, Herbert Graves, Ward Farmer, and Ray McKinley, who were involved with the cattle and horse industry to define the new event. A member of the commission suggested using the Spanish name for these types of competitions, rodeo. Although the proposer used the Spanish pronunciation of "roh-day-oh", after seeing the word written the committee chose to use a different pronunciation, "roh-dee-oh", to refer to the new competition.

Ray McKinley and W.O. Rominger presented the idea to the executive committee. The contest was approved and was added to the Stock Show calendar of events primarily because North Side Coliseum was the only arena with a capacity to accommodate the production and crowds expected. The 1918 Fort Worth Rodeo is considered the world's first indoor rodeo. It consisted of a total of twelve performances, two per day for six days. Contests included ladies bronc riding, junior steer riding, men's steer riding, men's bucking bronco, and a wild horse race—catch-as-catch-can with no saddle or bridle. The contestants were primarily Wild West Show performers, both male and female, who vied for a $3,000 prize. An estimated 23,000 people attended these first indoor rodeo events.

In 1927, the Stock Show introduced the first side release chutes for bucking horses and bulls, a development that is now a standard for the sport. As opposed to the earlier front-gate chutes, the side release allows the animal and rider into the arena when the gate opens. The chute has been termed as the safest method yet devised for protection of both cowboy and animal.

The Fort Worth Stock Show was also the first to feature Brahma bull riding. This contest originated in 1933, and is now one of the five major events in the sport worldwide. Bull riding is considered to be "the most dangerous and surely the most exciting event of rodeos."

In 1932, NBC produced the first live broadcast of a rodeo as local station WBAP broadcast. During World War II, the Fort Worth Stock Show introduced the first "half-time" rodeo performance, as Gene Autry made an appearance. This type of performance is now standard at rodeos across the United States, and many times the degree of success of a rodeo has been determined by audience acceptance of entertainment specials. In 1958, the Fort Worth Stock Show also became the first to have live television coverage of a complete rodeo performance, as 8 million viewers tuned into ABC to see guest stars including Roy Rogers and Dale Evans.

== Further expansion ==
The event took a hiatus in 1943, when all available facilities in Fort Worth, as well as transportation modes, were dedicated to the World War II effort. The following year, the exposition moved to the Will Rogers Memorial Center on the west side of the city. By 1948, the event was moved to January and February, and it drew 250,000 people.

Since moving to the Will Rogers Memorial Center, the Stock Show has taken the lead in improving the facility. The Stock Show governing committee has made it a policy to deed all improvements to the city of Fort Worth. Among the improvements are the construction of six all-weather livestock barns, four livestock/horse/rodeo arenas, two multipurpose commercial exhibits buildings, heating and air conditioning in the coliseum, auditorium and exhibits areas, and paved and lighted parking facilities.

== Modern event ==
The name was changed again in 1978, to Southwestern Exposition and Livestock Show. It is now held every year between mid-January and early February. The event lasts 23 days and is home to the World's Original Indoor Rodeo®, displaying 25 performances of professional rodeo annually. In addition, the exposition offers a carnival/midway, live music and entertainment in the Rodeo Roadhouse, multiple kid friendly exhibits, over 22,000 head of livestock and over four acres of commercial exhibits.

Annually, the event generates an estimated 150 million for the local economy drawing exhibitors and contestants from all over to the Fort Worth locale. An average of over 900,000 people attend the Show annually, representing more than 80 foreign countries as well as most U.S. states. Eighty-five percent of the show's events take place under roof, reducing the effect of what local Fort Worthians refer to as "Stock Show Weather" (it is not uncommon for ice storms to hit Fort Worth during that period). On average, the modern Stock Show has an economic impact of over $100 million for the Fort Worth area.

Initial Stock Show prizes consisted of gifts donated by Fort Worth area merchants. While this practice is no longer utilized, tremendous support from numerous breed associations, local Fort Worth businesses and many volunteer assist in raising cash amounts for livestock premiums. Millions of dollars are awarded annually to livestock and rodeo champions and participants. The ProRodeo Hall of Fame in Colorado Springs, Colorado, inducted the Southwestern Exposition and Livestock Show in 2008. The Texas Trail of Fame inducted the show in 2015. The Texas Cowboy Hall of Fame inducted the show in 2019.

The rodeo section of the Fort Worth Stock Show moved to the new Dickies Arena in 2020. The 2021 Stock Show was cancelled due to the COVID-19 pandemic; only the second time in the event's history. It returned in 2022. That same year, it received the Professional Rodeo Cowboys Association (PRCA) Large Indoor Rodeo of the Year award. The event set an attendance record in 2023 with more than 1.27 million visitors, creating a local economic impact of more than $142 million. The 2023 Stock Show also set a record for the highest purchase price at the Sale of Champions, when a 1,343-pound black European Cross named "Snoop Dog" was sold at auction by a 15-year old 4-H student from Canyon, Texas to local insurance company Higginbotham & Associates for a winning bid of $440,000.

== Charitable works ==
The Stock Show is incorporated as a non-profit organization, with the goal of creating “an educational showcase for the great livestock industry." Millions of dollars have been awarded as educational grants during the Stock Show's tenure. Apart from grants to Texas 4-H Club and FFA Chapter members, the Stock Show has also established endowed scholarships at Texas Christian University and Texas Tech University. The scholarships at TCU benefit students in the Ranch Management Program, while those at Texas Tech benefit students in the school's animal science or agricultural economics programs. An additional $4,000 grant is given annually to a student in the College of Veterinary Medicine at Texas A&M University.

The Fort Worth Chamber of Commerce a few years ago honored the Show with its "Spirit of Enterprise Award." The Stock Show received praise for "helping to build a modern Fort Worth, boosting agribusiness education with grants and scholarships, and demonstrating a strong spirit of enterprise." Based on a recent survey, the Stock Show generates an economic impact in excess of $100 million for the Fort Worth area.
