= Fat Stock Show =

Fat Stock Show may refer to:

- Houston Livestock Show and Rodeo, its original name
- Southwestern Exposition and Livestock Show, an early name for the Fort Worth, Texas-based event
