= Graham B. Purcell Jr. =

American politician (1919–2011)

Graham Boynton Purcell Jr.
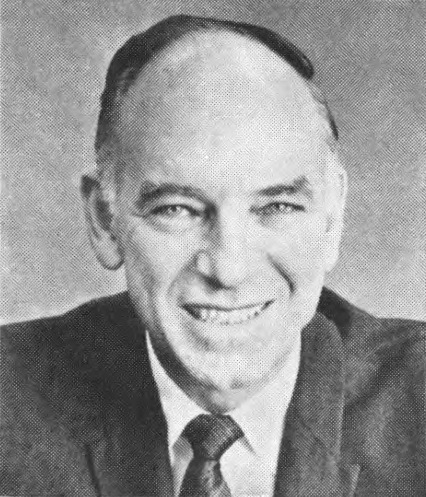

Member of the U.S. House of Representatives from Texas's 13th district
- In office January 27, 1962 – January 3, 1973
- Preceded by: Frank N. Ikard
- Succeeded by: Bob Price

Judge of the 89th Judicial District Court
- In office 1955–1962

Personal details
- Born: May 5, 1919 Archer City, Archer County; Texas, US
- Died: June 11, 2011 (aged 92) Wichita Falls, Texas
- Resting place: Archer City Cemetery in Archer City, Texas
- Party: Democratic
- Education: Texas A&M University; Baylor Law School
- Occupation: Lawyer

Military service
- Branch/service: United States Army
- Battles/wars: World War II

Graham Boynton Purcell Jr. (May 5, 1919 – June 11, 2011), was a United States representative from Texas' 13th congressional district.

Born in Archer City in Archer County, a part of the Wichita Falls metropolitan statistical area, Purcell attended public schools and received his Bachelor of Science from the Agricultural and Mechanical College of Texas in 1946, and his LL.B. in 1949 from Baylor Law School in Waco, Texas.

Purcell served in the United States Army during World War II from 1941 to 1946 and served thereafter in the United States Army Reserve. He served as judge of the Eighty-ninth Judicial District Court of Texas from 1955 to 1962. He was a delegate to the 1960 and 1964 Democratic national conventions, which met in Los Angeles and Atlantic City, New Jersey, respectively to nominate the Kennedy-Johnson and the Johnson-Humphrey tickets, both of which prevailed in Texas.

Campaigning as a moderately liberal Democrat, Purcell was elected to the Eighty-seventh Congress, by special election, to fill the vacancy caused by the resignation of fellow Democrat, Representative Frank N. Ikard. He was reelected to the five succeeding congresses (January 27, 1962 – January 3, 1973). In 1966, when John Tower won his second term as U. S. senator, Purcell defeated the Republican Dillard Carlisle "Bunny" Norwood (1913-1993) of Wichita Falls.

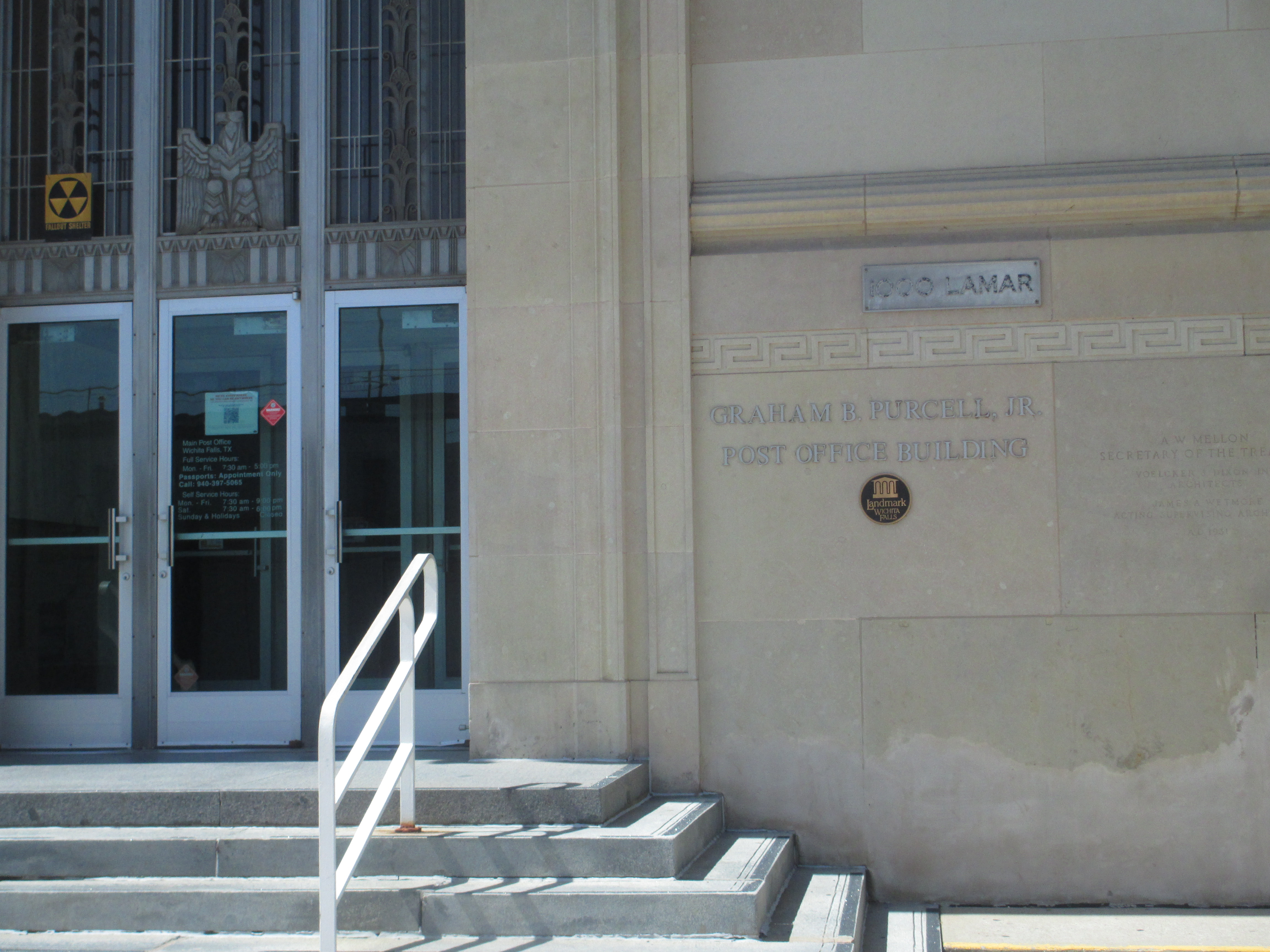
The Graham B. Purcell Jr. Post Office on Lamar Street in Wichita Falls, Texas

On November 22, 1963, Purcell was riding in the motorcade's third vehicle behind U.S. President Kennedy during the assassination in Dallas, Texas.

Although Texas gained a seat as a result of the 1970 Census, Purcell's 13th District was dismantled, and his home in Wichita Falls was merged with the Panhandle-based 18th District of Republican Bob Price for the 1972 elections. The new district was numerically Purcell's district—the 13th—but was geographically more Price's district. Purcell retained only one-third of his former constituents. Forced to run in territory that he did not know and that did not know him, Purcell was defeated by nine points.

In 1993, House bill HR 2292 was passed designating the federal building in Wichita Falls as the Graham B. Purcell Jr. Post Office and Federal Building. Purcell resided in Wichita Falls until his death at the age of ninety-two.

U.S. House of Representatives
Preceded by Frank N. Ikard	Member of the U.S. House of Representatives from Texas's 13th congressional district 1962–1973	Succeeded by Bob Price
