= Higginbotham Insurance & Financial Services =

Insurance brokerage firm

Higginbotham
- Company type: Private
- Industry: Insurance broker and service provider
- Founded: 1948
- Headquarters: Fort Worth, Texas; United States
- Number of locations: 140+ offices (2025)
- Area served: Alabama, Arkansas, Arizona, California, Colorado, Florida, Georgia, Kentucky, Louisiana, Mississippi, Missouri, New Mexico, Ohio, Oklahoma, Tennessee, Texas
- Key people: President/CEO Rusty Reid
- Services: Insurance, Financial and HR Services
- Revenue: $905 million (2024)
- Number of employees: 3,200 (2024)
- Website: www.higginbotham.com

Higginbotham is an independent insurance brokerage firm founded in 1948 that provides businesses and individuals with insurance, financial services, risk management and employee benefit services.

In addition to its headquarters in Fort Worth, Texas, Higginbotham operates in more than 140 offices across the U.S. with nearly 4,000 employees. Higginbotham is ranked in the top 20 largest independent insurance brokerages in the U.S.

== History ==
Paul C. Higginbotham founded his namesake agency in 1948 after returning from military service in World War II. It started as a small personal insurance brokerage firm in Paul’s Riverside neighborhood of Fort Worth, Texas.

Paul’s nephew, Bill Stroud, purchased the agency in 1962 from his aunt who inherited it when Paul died. Between 1968 and 1983, the firm moved four times to more central locations in Fort Worth to attract an increasingly diverse clientele.

In 1986, Bill hired Rusty Reid from American General Fire and Casualty Company to broker commercial insurance at Higginbotham. Three years later, Rusty became president and CEO at age 27. He implemented an employee ownership model to engage and reward employees in the company’s growth and established the firm’s Financial Services division to begin offering employee benefits.

Higginbotham’s first geographic expansion occurred in 1998 with the opening of a second office in Dallas and was followed by several others in North and Central Texas. Then in 2007, the firm initiated an aggressive growth strategy, merging with like minded independent agencies that support its business model. As of 2023, Higginbotham had expanded its footprint to 87 offices spanning the U.S.

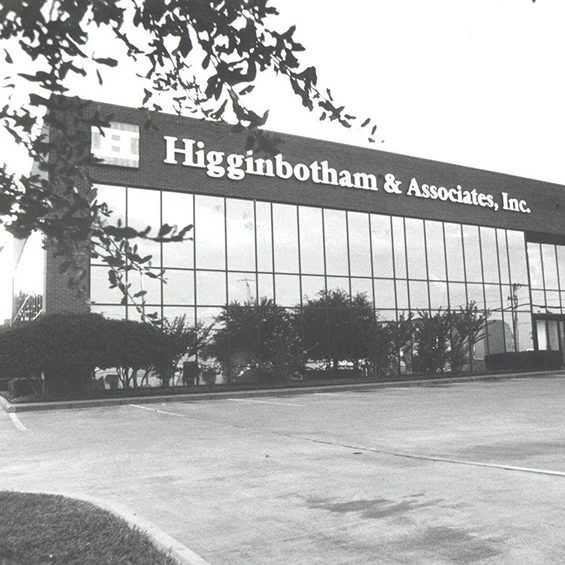
Bailey Ave. Building in Fort Worth, TX

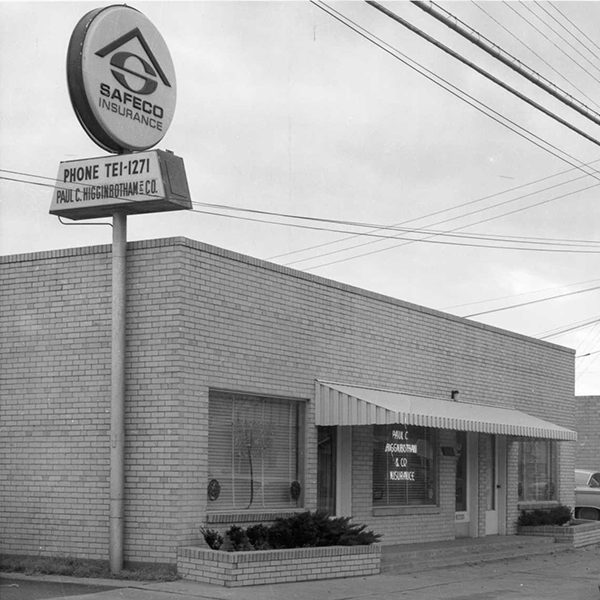
Race St. Building in Fort Worth, TX

== Products and services ==
Higginbotham's core service offerings include business insurance, employee benefits, personal insurance, human resources services and financial services.

=== Business Insurance ===
Higginbotham provides a variety of commercial insurance policies, including general liability, property, commercial auto, builders' risk, errors and omissions, cyber liability, directors and officers, inland marine, business interruption, umbrella, employment practices liability, workers' compensation and business owners' policies. The firm also provides surety bonds and captive insurance, as well as risk management services.

=== Employee Benefits ===
Higginbotham's employee benefits division advises employers on plan design and helps administer group and voluntary plans such as health, dental, vision, life and disability insurance. The firm also provides consulting on executive benefits, retirement plans, pharmacy benefits and population health.

=== Personal Insurance ===
- Home Insurance
- Auto Insurance
- Renters' Insurance
- Personal Watercraft Insurance
- Farm and Ranch Insurance
- Private Client Services

=== HR Services ===
- HR Consulting
- HR Outsourcing

=== Financial Services ===
- Retirement Plans
- Executive Compensation
- Life Insurance
- Disability Insurance
- Long-Term Care Insurance
- Individual and Corporate Financial Consulting

== Community involvement ==
The Higginbotham Community Fund is a donor advised fund that was created in 2011 in partnership with the North Texas Community Foundation. Grants are distributed to nonprofits across Higginbotham's footprint that are recommended by employees and selected by a Higginbotham advisory committee. The fund is financed by employee donations and pledges with a corporate matching component.

By 2020, the fund had raised $3.4 million with $2.5 million in grants awarded. As of 2024, the fund has raised more than $14 million through employee and company contributions and has given grants totaling over $10 million.

== Honors and awards ==
- Rank #1 in Insurance Business America's 2024 list of Best Insurance Brokerages in the USA
- Rank #19 in the Business Insurance 2025 list of 100 Largest Brokers of U.S. Business based on 2024 revenue
- Rank #12 in the Insurance Journal 2025 list of the top 100 property/casualty agencies
- Rank #3 in the Business Insurance 2024 Best Places to Work in Insurance
- Inc. 5000's 2025 List of Fastest-Growing Private Companies in America
- National Association for Business Resources’ The Nation's Best and Brightest in Wellness 2025
- Insurance Journal's 2019 Overall Best Independent Agency to Work For
- Insurance Business America's 2024 Fastest-growing Insurance Companies in the USA
- Rank #30 in Healthiest Employers' 2024 Healthiest 100 Workplaces in America
- Business Insurance's 2020 Community Outreach Project of the Year (donations)
- 2024 Wellness Council of America Certified Platinum Well Workplace
- Higginbotham was one of 35 independent brokers featured on the 2014 inaugural list of Elite Agencies published by Insurance Business America
- Higginbotham has been recognized as an A+ accredited business by the Better Business Bureau of Fort Worth since March 1, 1990
