= Texas Cowboys =

Students' club at UT Austin

- Motto: "Give the best you have to Texas and the best will come back to you"
- Type: Service Organization
- Established: 1922
- Founders: Arno Nowotny & Bill McGill
- President: Alumni President: Brian Antweil
- Director: Eddie Lopez
- Location: Austin, Texas
- Website: www.texascowboys.org

The Texas Cowboys is an honorary student service organization at the University of Texas at Austin. The organization was founded in 1922 with the purpose of serving the University of Texas and maintaining Smokey the Cannon. It is considered one of the "oldest and most elite student organizations" at the university. Among its alumni are national politicians, two Texas governors, prominent businessmen, and professional athletes.

== Purpose ==
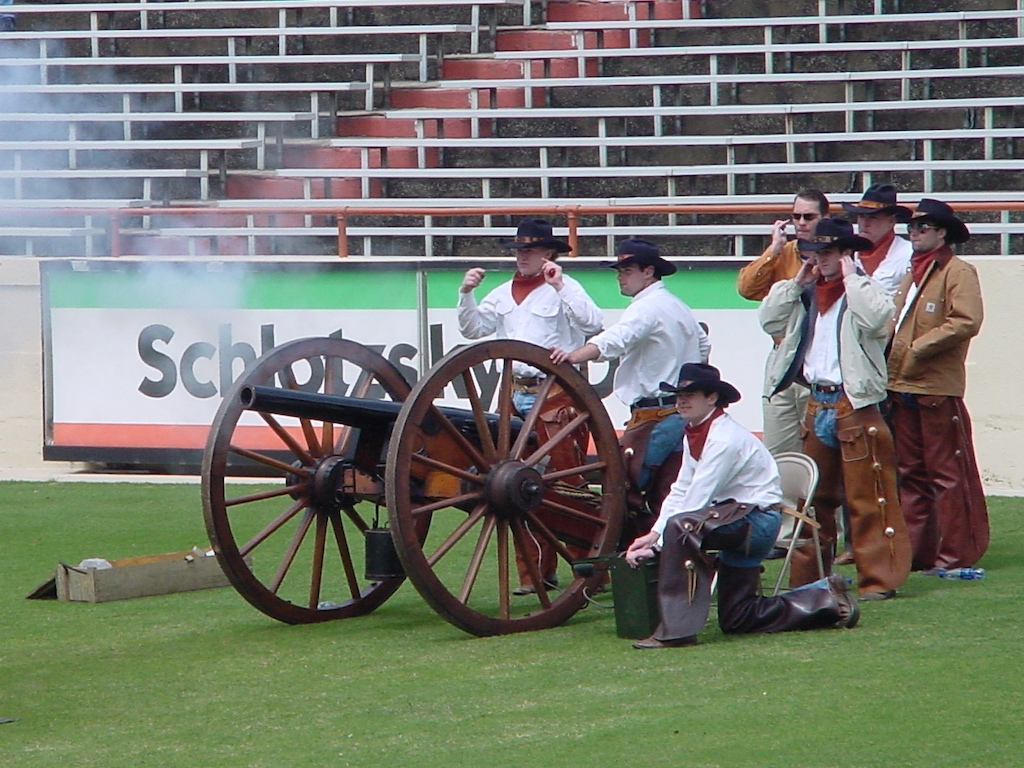
Several Cowboys fire Smokey the Cannon on the sideline.

The Texas Cowboys serve as ambassadors of the University of Texas and are present at numerous significant university-sponsored events. They are most well-known for their responsibility keeping and maintaining Smokey the Cannon, which is present at all Texas Longhorns home football games.

== History ==
In 1922, two students at the University of Texas at Austin decided to form a club. These two men were head cheerleader Arno Nowotny and Longhorn Band president Bill McGill. In 1922, 40 men from all aspects of campus life were chosen by McGill and Nowotny to be the first Texas Cowboys. Throughout its nearly 100 years of existence, becoming a Texas Cowboy became a high honor to its members.

In 1953 Smokey the Cannon was created by the university's mechanical engineering lab in response to the shotgun blasts often heard at the Red River Rivalry and was then presented in 1954 to the University of Texas by the Texas Cowboys. That same year, the Cowboys began their involvement with and support of The Arc of the Capital Area.

In 1955 Smokey was modified to shoot twin 10-gauge shotgun shells and the revision was renamed "Smokey II". A replica can be found at the Texas Cowboys Pavilion; the original is in the Denius Hall of Fame in the north endzone of the DKR Memorial Stadium. Smokey II was used until 1988.

On the Monday following the assassination of President John F. Kennedy in 1963, Smokey fired a 21-gun salute to the fallen president during the climactic moment in a public ceremony in front of the state capitol.

In 1988, Smokey III, a Civil War-replica cannon standing six feet tall, weighing 1,200 pounds, and firing four 10-gauge shotgun shells was constructed by Lupton Machine and remains in service to this day.

In 2019, the University of Texas suspended the Texas Cowboys spirit group from campus for six years following an investigation into alleged hazing during a retreat in 2018, where new members were subjected to physical brutality, forced ingestion of unwanted substances, and coerced consumption of alcohol.

== Distinguished alumni ==
Political and judicial figures

- Dolph Briscoe - 41st Governor of Texas
- Allan Shivers - 37th Governor of Texas
- Lloyd Bentsen - Former United States Secretary of the Treasury, United States Senator from Texas, 1988 Vice Presidential Nominee
- Donald Evans - Former United States Secretary of Commerce, chairman of the George W. Bush presidential campaign, chairman of the Board of Regents of the University of Texas System
- Jack Brooks - Former member of the U.S. House of Representatives from Texas' 9th and 2nd districts
- Frank N. Ikard - Former member of the U.S. House of Representatives from Texas' 13th district
- Bob Armstrong - Former U.S. Under Secretary of the Interior, Texas Land Commissioner, and Texas state representative
- George Bayoud - Former Secretary of State of Texas, real estate investor
- Lloyd Hand - Former Chief of Protocol of the United States
- Keith L. Brown - Former president of the Council of American Ambassadors, United States Ambassador to Denmark and Lesotho
- Robert Strauss - Former United States Ambassador to the Soviet Union, chairman of the Democratic National Committee, chairman of the Jimmy Carter presidential campaign
- Peter R. Coneway - Former United States Ambassador to Switzerland and Liechtenstein, prominent investment banker
- John Hill - Former Chief Justice, Supreme Court of Texas, Texas Attorney General, Secretary of State of Texas
- Barefoot Sanders - Retired Chief Judge, United States District Court
- John Singleton - Retired Chief Judge, United States District Court
- Sam Sparks - Federal Judge, United States District Court
- Joe Greenhill - Former Chief Justice, Supreme Court of Texas
- Four Price - Current member, Texas House of Representatives

University figures

- Jack Blanton - Former regent of the University of Texas System, chairman and CEO of Scurlock Oil Company
- Larry Faulkner - Former president of the University of Texas, former president of Houston Endowment Inc.
- Ricardo Romo - President of the University of Texas at San Antonio
- H. Scott Caven, Jr. - Former chairman of the Board of Regents of the University of Texas System
- Wales Madden - Former regent of the University of Texas System
- Patrick Oxford - Former regent of the University of Texas System
- Howard N. Richards - Former regent of the University of Texas System
- W. Page Keeton - Former attorney, dean of the University of Texas School of Law
- Mike Perrin - Former Men's Athletics Director

Athletes and coaches

- Tom Landry - Former head coach, Dallas Cowboys, member of the Pro Football Hall of Fame
- David McWilliams - Former head football coach, University of Texas
- Earl Campbell - Former running back, Heisman Trophy winner, member of the Pro Football Hall of Fame
- Tommy Nobis - Former linebacker, Maxwell Award winner, member of the College Football Hall of Fame
- Doug English - Former defensive tackle, 4-time Pro Bowl selection, member of the College Football Hall of Fame
- Colt McCoy - Quarterback, New York Giants, Maxwell Award winner
- Scottie Scheffler - Golfer, 2022 Masters Tournament champion
- Beau Hossler - Golfer, led the 2012 U.S. Open at 17-years-old
- Will Licon - Swimmer, 11-time NCAA Champion, American Record-holder, 2017 Big 12 Athlete of the Year
- Cullen Loeffler - Long snapper, Minnesota Vikings
- Daron Roberts - Former assistant coach, Cleveland Browns
- Kramer Hickok - Golfer, PGA Tour Canada's player of the year in 2017
- Major Applewhite - Head Coach, University of South Alabama
- James Saxton - College Football Hall of Fame

Others

- James T. Willerson - President and medical director of The Texas Heart Institute
- Denton Cooley - Renowned heart surgeon, founder of The Texas Heart Institute
- Benno C. Schmidt, Sr. - Former attorney and venture capitalist
- Thomas Lumpkin - Former president of Gulf Oil
- Ronald Steinhart - Retired chairman and CEO of the Commercial Banking Group of Bank One Corporation
- Malcolm Wallace, former UT student body president, economist for the United States Department of Agriculture, and press secretary to then-United States Senator Lyndon B. Johnson.

== Suspensions ==
The Cowboys have been suspended twice after hazing incidents.

In 1995, the Texas Cowboys were suspended from the UT campus for five years after one of their New Men, Gabe Higgins, died during a retreat. Independent investigators determined that the Texas Cowboys engaged in eight hazing violations. The organization was already on probation for hazing at the time, and this was the third penalty for hazing in as many years. The Texas Cowboys were reestablished in 2000.

In 2019, the Texas Cowboys were suspended from the UT campus for six years for hazing violations. New Man Nicholas Cumberland died in a car crash returning from a retreat held at a ranch outside of Austin. Cumberland's death prompted a university investigation into the retreat, which discovered multiple forms of hazing that led to the group's suspension, including forced ingestion of unwanted substances (including cat food), coerced animal cruelty (namely biting a hamster's head off), and physical brutality. The Texas Cowboys accepted the terms of their suspension.

In 2023, the University of Texas granted the Texas Cowboys provisional permission to return to campus. This decision is part of the university's Nine Dimensions of Successful Student Organizations program, which aims to foster accountability and address hazing within student groups. As of 2023, the Texas Cowboys are officially back on campus, operating under these revised guidelines.

== See also ==
- Texas Silver Spurs
