= Ed Gossett =

American politician (1902–1990)

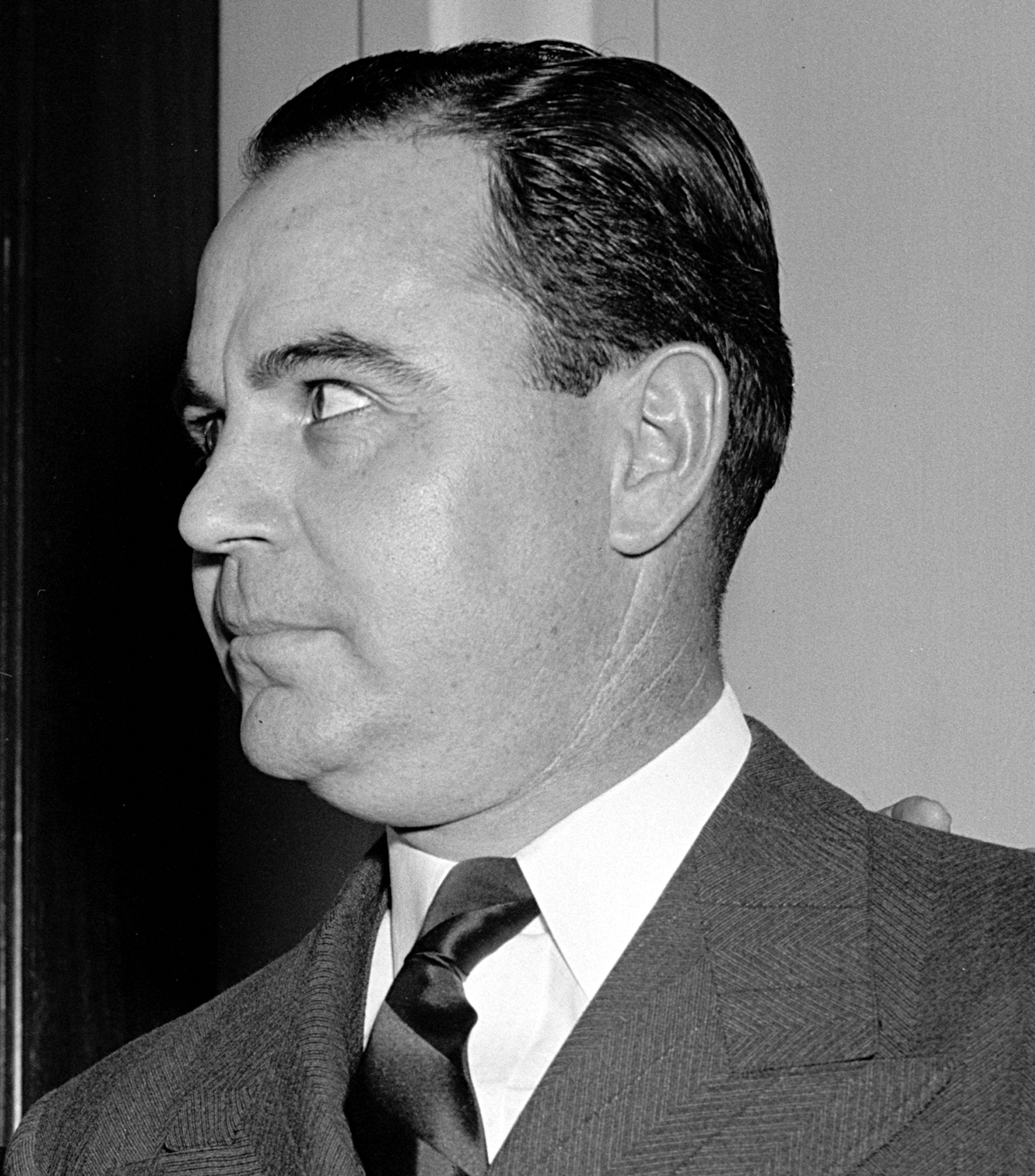

Member of the U.S. House of Representatives from Texas's 13th district
- In office January 3, 1939 – July 31, 1951
- Preceded by: William D. McFarlane
- Succeeded by: Frank N. Ikard

Personal details
- Born: Ed Lee Gossett; January 27, 1902 Sabine Parish, Louisiana, U.S.
- Died: November 6, 1990 (aged 88) Dallas, Texas, U.S.
- Party: Democratic

Ed Lee Gossett (January 27, 1902 – November 6, 1990) was a U.S. representative from Texas.

Born in a sawmill camp known as Yellow Pine, near Many, Sabine Parish, Louisiana, Gossett moved to Texas in 1908 with his parents, who settled on a farm near Henrietta, Clay County and attended the rural schools of Clay and Garza Counties, Texas. He graduated from the University of Texas at Austin, A.B., 1924 and the law school of the same university, LL.B., 1927. He was admitted to the bar the latter year and commenced practice in Vernon, Texas. He moved to Wichita Falls, Texas, in 1937 and continued the practice of law. He served as district attorney of the forty-sixth judicial district 1933-1937.

Gossett was elected as a Democrat to the Seventy-sixth and to the six succeeding Congresses and served from January 3, 1939, until his resignation on July 31, 1951. He served as chairman of the Committee on Elections No. 2 (Seventy-seventh through Seventy-ninth Congresses). According to his 1944 letterhead, he also served on the following committees as a member: Census, Territories, Insular Affairs, Revision of the Laws, and Immigration and Naturalization. While in office, Gossett was an outspoken opponent of permitting Jewish Holocaust survivors to resettle in America, describing them as a "new Fifth Column" and the "refugee racket". Gossett also played a prominent role in the congressional debate over the ownership of offshore oil resources, supporting Texas's claim in the tidelands controversy during the late 1940s and early 1950s.

Following his resignation from Congress, Gossett resumed the practice of law and was general attorney for the Texas Southwestern Bell Telephone Co. He served as judge of Criminal District Court, Dallas, Texas, until his death on November 6, 1990.

== Sources ==
- United States Congress. "Ed Gossett (id: G000338)". Biographical Directory of the United States Congress.

U.S. House of Representatives
Preceded by William D. McFarlane	Member of the U.S. House of Representatives from Texas's 13th congressional district January 3, 1939 – July 31, 1951	Succeeded by Frank N. Ikard
