= Daron Roberts =

American motivational speaker and former NFL coach

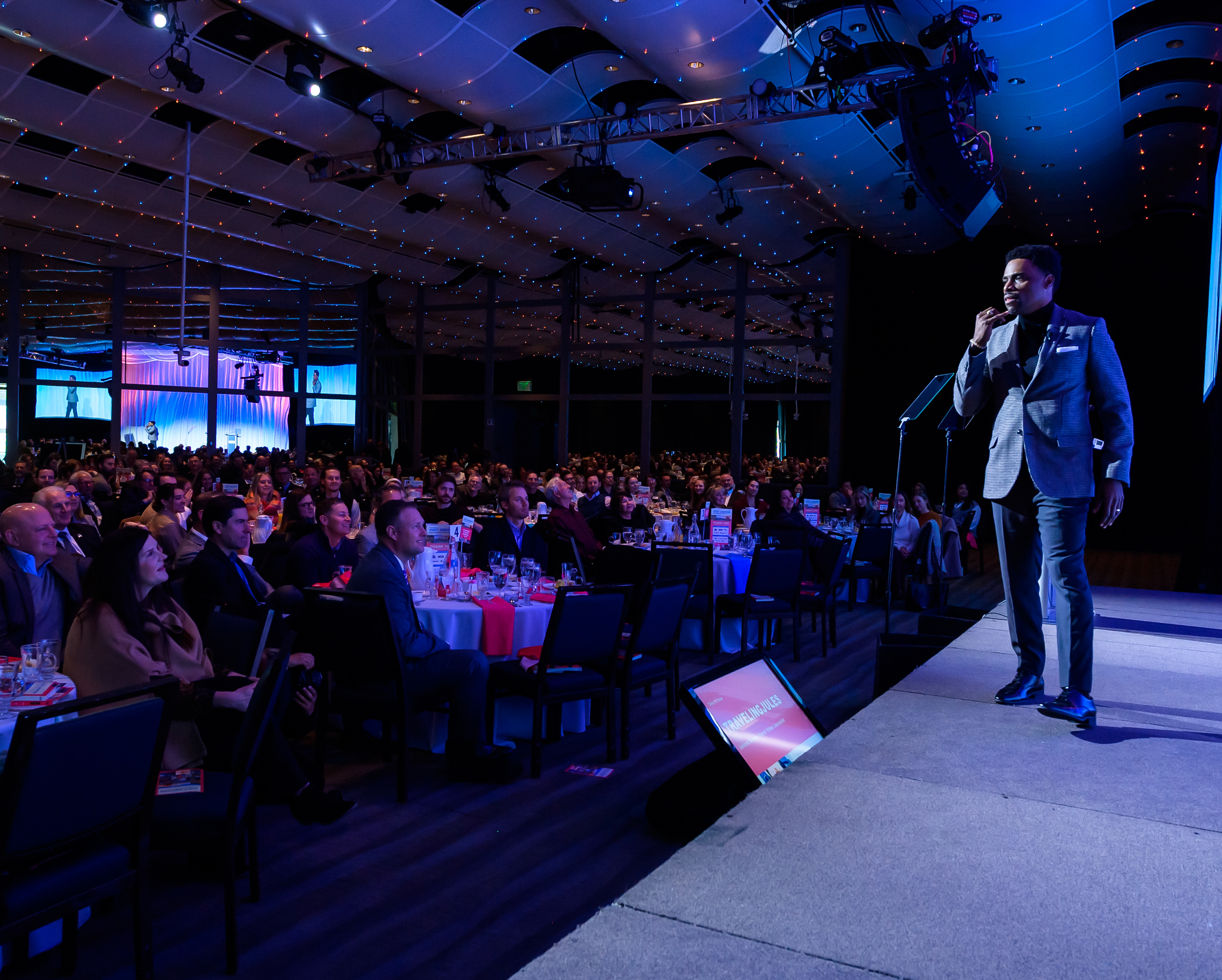
Roberts addresses a group of Coca-Cola executives

Daron K. Roberts (born November 29, 1978, in Mt. Pleasant, Texas) is a former NFL coach and a leadership speaker.

Formerly, he served as a distinguished university lecturer at the University of Texas where he also served as the founding director of the Center for Sports Leadership & Innovation at the University of Texas.

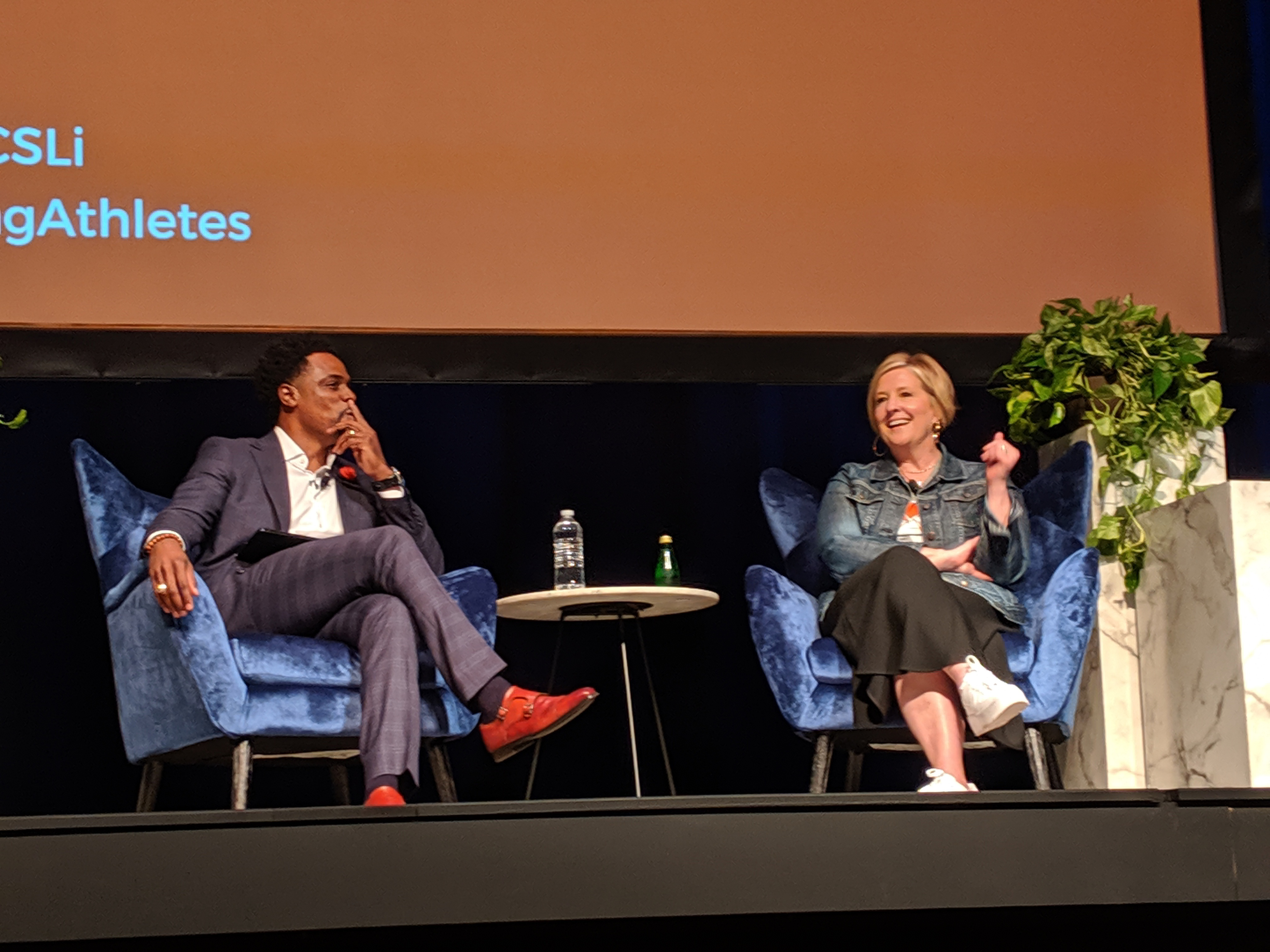
Empathy in Sports (2019)

His writing has appeared in The Houston Chronicle and Huffington Post as well as Forbes and Fortune. He also served as a guest analyst for ESPN's Longhorn Network.

== Books ==
Roberts is the author of the three books: Call An Audible: Let My Pivot from Harvard Law School to NFL Coach Guide Your Next Transition, A Kids Book About Empathy, Microwins: Go Small, Build Momentum, and Tackle the Goals that Actually Matter in Life.

== Early years ==
Daron Roberts was born in Longview, Texas. He is a fifth-generation East Texan. His family moved to Mount Pleasant, Texas, when Roberts was 5, and he attended Mount Pleasant Independent School District public schools before graduating from Mount Pleasant High School in 1997. As a member of the varsity football team, Roberts earned 1st Team All-District Honors as a strong safety in 1996. During high school, Roberts served as class president all four years.

== College years ==
Roberts attended the University of Texas and double majored in the Plan II Honors Program and Government while being an active member of the Texas Cowboys. During his senior year, Roberts won the student government presidency of the largest student body in the United States. After graduating in 2001, Roberts deferred entrance to the Harvard Kennedy School of Government at Harvard University and worked as an intern for Senator Joseph I. Lieberman and Lt. Governor Bill Ratliff before attending the Harvard Kennedy School beginning in the fall of in 2002

After graduating with a master's degree in public policy, Roberts entered Harvard Law School.

During the summer before his third year, Roberts volunteered at the Steve Spurrier Football Camp at the University of South Carolina. That experience prompted Roberts to pursue a football coaching job. He returned to Harvard and wrote 164 letters seeking an internship. After writing letters to the head coach and defensive coordinator of every NFL franchise and 50 FBS teams, Roberts received an offer to serve as a training camp intern with the Kansas City Chiefs.

== Coaching career ==
Kansas City Chiefs Coach Herman Edwards allowed Roberts to volunteer for the 2007 season before hiring him as a defensive quality control assistant in 2008. He assisted the defensive backs coach with off-the-field matters while in Kansas City.

In 2009, Roberts left the Chiefs to work as the assistant secondary coach with the Detroit Lions.

In 2011, Roberts left his position with the Detroit Lions to become the special teams and inside receivers coach at West Virginia University. For the 2012 season, Roberts was the Mountaineers' cornerbacks coach.

The following year he made the jump back to the NFL and was the assistant secondary coach for the Cleveland Browns.

== 4th and 1 ==
In 2010, Roberts founded 4th and 1, a nonprofit that provides free ACT prep, football skills training, and life skills development to high school students in Texas and Michigan. The first 4th and 1 Football Camp was offered at Northeast Texas Community College in Mount Pleasant, Texas. A select group of 35 student-athletes were chosen from four East Texas counties. Former Longhorn stars Derrick Johnson and Ahmad Brooks visited the camp. 4th and 1 held camps at Michigan State (East Lansing) and Mount Pleasant, Texas, in 2011 and 2012.

For his efforts. the University of Texas awarded him the 2011 Outstanding Young Texas "Ex." The Presidential Leadership Scholarship, a joint venture between three U.S. presidents selected him to its inaugural class in 2015.

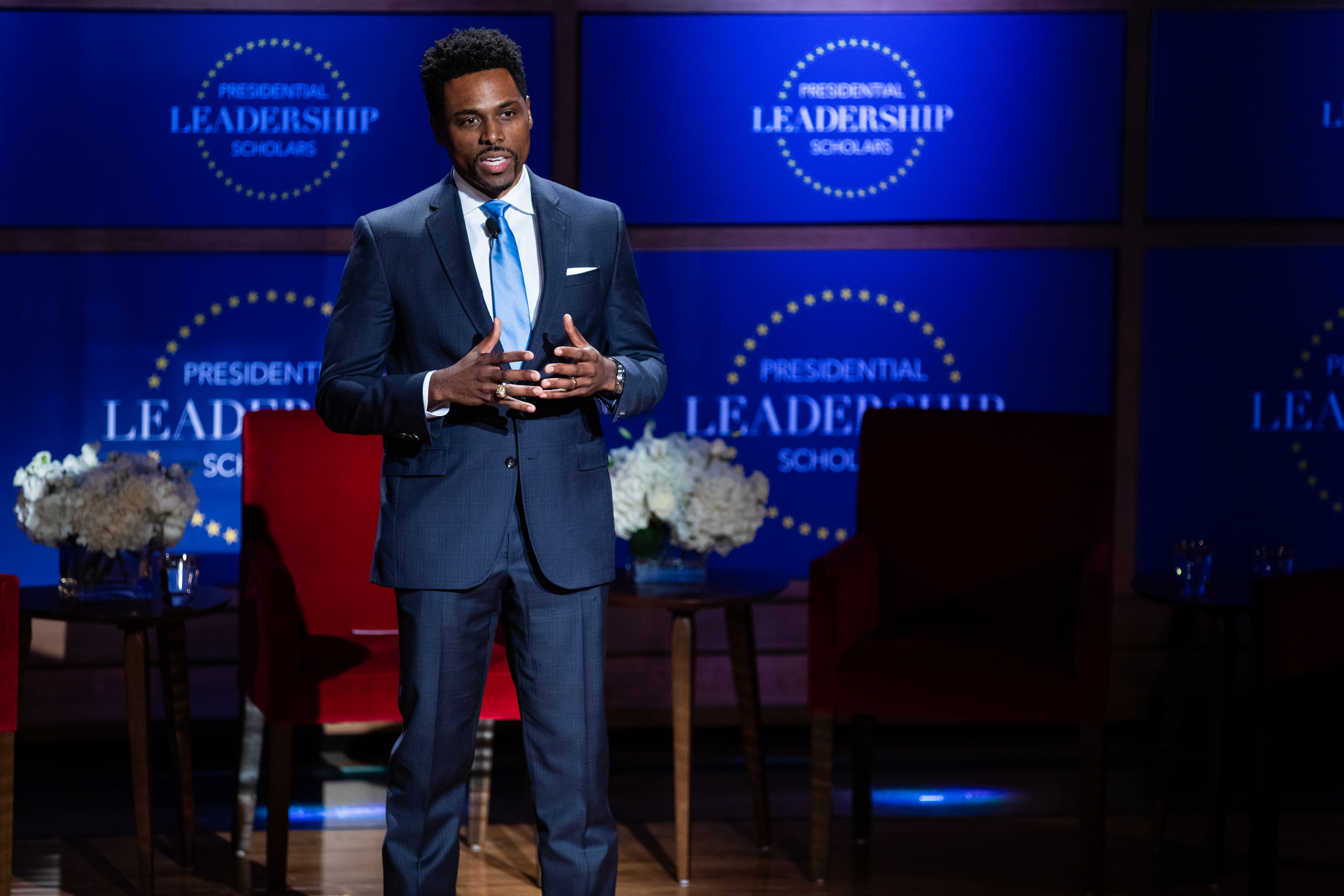
Roberts addressing the Presidential Leadership Scholars (2018)
