= William E. Higginbotham Elementary School =

NHRP structure in Michigan

- U.S. National Register of Historic Places
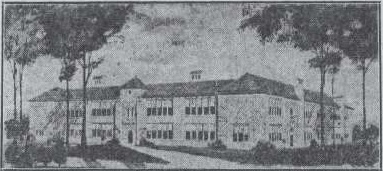
- William Higginbotham School, 1927
- Interactive map
- Location: 8730 Chippewa Ave. Detroit, Michigan
- Coordinates: 42°26′28″N 83°9′31″W
- Built: 1927
- Built by: Stibbard Construction Company
- Architect: Niels Chester Sorensen
- Architectural style: Mediterranean Revival
- MPS: Public Schools of Detroit MPS
- NRHP reference No.: 100008470
- Added to NRHP: December 9, 2022

The William E. Higginbotham Elementary School (or simply the Higginbotham School) is a former school located at 8730 Chippewa Avenue in Detroit.It was listed on the National Register of Historic Places in 2022.

== History ==
Detroit expanded greatly in the 1920s, and a number of new schools were constructed. In 1922, the city annexed the east side of what was then Greenfield Township, near this school. However, the new annexation specifically excluded what was a small working class community of Black residents. In 1924, this neighborhood was annexed, and the Detroit Board of Education planned to build an integrated school to service the area, However, White residents objected, and instead the Board acquired land to build this school to serve Black students. In 1926, the Board hired the Detroit architectural firm of N. Chester Sorensen Company to design the school. Construction began in 1927, with Stibbard Construction Company as general contractor, and the school was completed and opened in January 1928.

When it was opened, Higginbotham Elementary School served Black students in kindergarten through eighth grade, and had a capacity of 580 pupils. Additions were constructed in 1946 and 1948, but the school was still overcrowded enough that eighth grade students were moved to the nearby majority White Post Intermediate School. However, White parents objected, and Black students were moved back to Higginbotham, causing Black parents to picket until the Detroit Board of Education promised to resolve the issue.

However, as the 1950s wound on, Detroit's population declined, as did the student population at Higginbotham. By 1966, academic performance at Higginbotham was plunging. The building was later used as the High School of Commerce. In 2006, it became the home of the W. E. B. DuBois/Aisha Shule Preparatory Academy, a charter school which served grades six through twelve. The Academy closed in 2013, and the school building is owned by the city of Detroit.

In 2024, a $35.9 million redevelopment project was begun to turn the school into 100 units of affordable housing, known as the Higginbotham Art Residences. Construction is expected to be completed in early 2026.

== Description ==
The William E. Higginbotham Elementary School is a two-story multi-shaded beige brick Mediterranean Revival school with a roughly U-shaped footprint. The main 1927 building has a Spanish terra cotta tile hip roof while the later additions have flat roofs. On each facade, the window bays are divided by vertical brick piers. On the main facade, an arched entryway under a detailed limestone arch is flanked by piers with dark maroon-colored brick set in patterns to resemble quoins
