= Smokey the Cannon =

Large gun used to mark each time the Texas Longhorns score in a home game

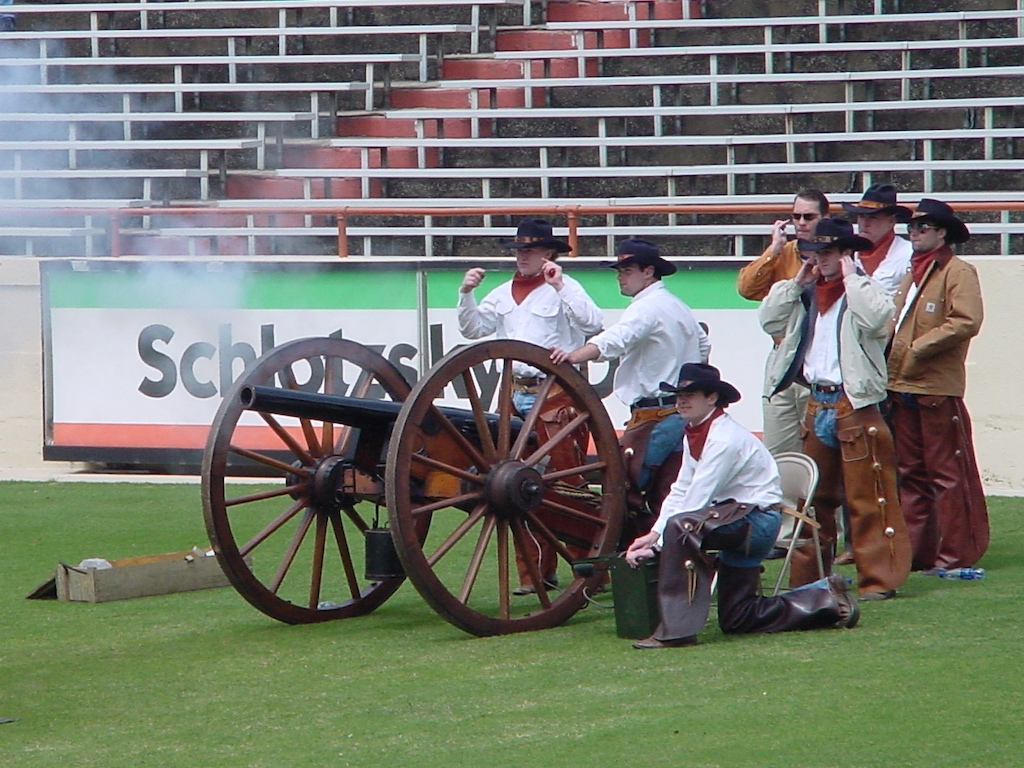
The Texas Cowboys firing Smokey at the 2003 Texas Football Spring Jamboree.

Smokey the Cannon is a replica Civil War artillery cannon that has served as part of the pageantry of college football games at the University of Texas at Austin since 1953. Smokey the Cannon is owned and operated by the Texas Cowboys (an honorary men’s service organization at Texas) and is stationed in the left corner of the south endzone at Darrell K Royal–Texas Memorial Stadium during every Texas Longhorns home football game. After each football season, Smokey the Cannon is generally displayed in the Red McCombs Red Zone atrium for the spring semester.

Smokey the Cannon is shot off at every Texas Longhorns score, kick-off, end of quarter, and most importantly, it is fired off after the world-famous college school song, "The Eyes of Texas" at the conclusion of every Texas football game.

In addition to all home football games, Smokey the Cannon is present at the annual Texas vs. Oklahoma Red River Rivalry game in Dallas, Texas every October, as well as at other select football games outside of Austin, Texas (barring local and stadium permission). Recently, Smokey the Cannon was present at the 2025 Citrus Bowl, where the Longhorns beat the Michigan Wolverines, 41-27

The Cannon has appeared at countless charity and volunteer events across the country and is maintained and transported by the Cannon Crew — a team of four Oldmen, voted on by the entire organization each spring. During the 2012 spring semester, "Smokey III" appeared at Congregation Beth Yeshurun Synagogue in Houston, Texas to honor the Berry family who lost two parents in a car accident in July 2011.

== History ==
Originally, Smokey I was created by the University of Texas at Austin's mechanical engineering lab in 1953, in response to shotgun blasts often heard at the Red River Rivalry. Two years later, Smokey I was modified in 1955 to shoot twin 10-gauge shotgun shells and the revision was renamed "Smokey II". "Smokey II" was used by the Texas Cowboys for over 30 years.

The current version of the cannon, Smokey III, weighs 1,200 pounds and fires up to four blank 10-gauge shells at a time. Smokey III was built by Lupton Machine of Austin, out of the trunk of an oak tree in 1988 and purchased by the Texas Cowboys Alumni Association for $15,000. Smokey III is transported in the Texas Cowboys’ trailer along with a wooden toolbox containing all necessary items to operate the cannon.

== See also ==
- Columbus Blue Jackets’ cannon
