= Frank N. Ikard =

American politician (1913–1991)

Frank Neville Ikard
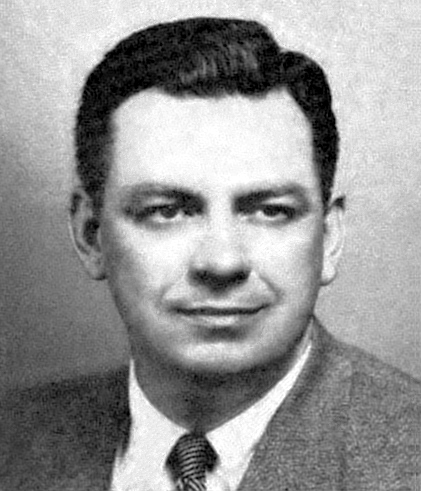

Member of the U.S. House of Representatives from Texas's 13th district
- In office September 8, 1951 – December 15, 1961
- Preceded by: Ed Gossett
- Succeeded by: Graham B. Purcell, Jr.

Judge of the Texas 30th Judicial District Court
- In office November 1948 – September 8, 1951

Personal details
- Born: January 30, 1913 Henrietta, Texas, US
- Died: May 1, 1991 (aged 78) Washington, D.C., US
- Resting place: Arlington National Cemetery
- Party: Democratic
- Education: Schreiner University University of Texas University of Texas School of Law
- Occupation: Lawyer/lobbyist

Military service
- Branch/service: United States Army
- Battles/wars: World War II Prisoner of War in Germany

Frank Neville Ikard (January 30, 1913 – May 1, 1991) was a Democratic United States representative from Texas' 13th congressional district, centered about Wichita Falls, Texas.

Ikard was born in Henrietta in Clay County, Texas, and attended the public schools and the Schriener Institute, in Kerrville, Texas. He earned a Bachelor of Arts in 1936 at the University of Texas in Austin, where he was a member of the honorary men's service organization known as the Texas Cowboys. He received his law degree from the University of Texas School of Law in 1937 and was admitted that year to the bar.

Ikard began his practice of law in Wichita Falls in the firm now known as Gibson Davenport Anderson; one of the founding partners of the firm was Orville Bullington, the 1932 Republican gubernatorial nominee.

Ikard enlisted in the United States Army in January 1944 and served with Company K, One Hundred and Tenth Infantry, Twenty-eighth Division. He was prisoner of war in Germany in 1944 and 1945. He was awarded the Purple Heart Medal.

== Political history ==
After the war, Ikard served as judge of Thirtieth Judicial District Court of Wichita Falls. He was appointed chairman of the Veterans Affairs Commission of Texas in 1948. Then Governor Beauford Jester in November 1948 named Ikard as judge of the Thirtieth Judicial District Court. He subsequently was elected in 1950, and served until September 8, 1951. He was a delegate to the Democratic National Conventions in 1956, 1960, and 1968. He was chairman of the Texas State Democratic Convention in 1960.

Ikard was elected to the Eighty-second Congress to fill the vacancy created by the resignation of his fellow Democrat, Ed Gossett. He was reelected to the Eighty-third and to the four succeeding Congresses and served from September 8, 1951, to December 15, 1961, when he resigned to become an oil industry lobbyist.

He was one of the majority of the Texan delegation to decline to sign the 1956 Southern Manifesto opposing the desegregation of public schools ordered by the Supreme Court in Brown v. Board of Education. However, Ikard voted against the Civil Rights Acts of 1957 and 1960.

== Later career ==
Ikard served as the executive vice president of American Petroleum Institute from 1962 to 1963 and as president from 1963 to 1980. He spoke during the Annual Meeting of the American Petroleum Institute 1965 and stated:

This report unquestionably will fan emotions, raise fears, and bring demands for action. The substance of the report is that there is still time to save the world's peoples from the catastrophic consequence of pollution, but time is running out.

One of the most important predictions of the report is that carbon dioxide is being added to the atmosphere by the burning of coal, oil, and natural gas at such a rate that by the year 2000 the heat balance will be so modified as possibly to cause marked changes in climate beyond local or even national efforts. The report further states, and I quote:

“… the pollution from internal combustion engines is so serious, and is growing so fast that an alternative nonpolluting means of powering automobiles, buses, and trucks is likely to become a national necessity.” Ikard, F. N. Meeting the challenges of 1966. In Annual Meeting of the American Petroleum Institute 1965 12–15 (API, 1965).

He was appointed in 1965, and reappointed in 1967, to the University of Texas Board of Regents by Governor John B. Connally, Jr.

== Personal life ==
Ikard was the grandson of rancher William S. Ikard.

His first wife was the former Jean Hunter, who died in 1970. They had two sons, Frank Ikard, Jr., and William F. Ikard. Later, Ikard married the former Jayne Keegan Brumley (c. 1927–2010), a native of Walpole, Massachusetts, a prominent journalist, and the widow of Calvin Brumley, also a journalist, originally from Hereford, Texas. The Brumleys moved in 1960 to Boston, Massachusetts, where Calvin headed the area bureau of The Wall Street Journal. Jayne worked for the Boston Herald and contributed to Newsweek. She provided the first national coverage of cookbook author Julia Child and became a close friend of the opera singer Beverly Sills. She interviewed Robert Frost and covered the campaign in 1966 of United States Senator Edward Brooke, a Moderate Republican and the first African-American elected to the upper congressional chamber since Reconstruction. She later covered the 1968 presidential campaign, first Robert F. Kennedy and, after Kennedy's assassination, Richard Nixon, the victor in the race against Hubert Humphrey.

Ikard met his second wife at an environmental conference in Sweden. He was irritated when he first saw Jayne carrying an image of a silver whale while she marched in a parade in Stockholm. The two were introduced the next night at a dinner and were married after a quick courtship six weeks later in Austin, Texas. On their wedding day, the Ikards visited former President Lyndon B. Johnson, then in the last year of his life, and Lady Bird Johnson at their LBJ Ranch in Gillespie County in the Texas Hill Country. Johnson invited the couple to spend their honeymoon at his Haywood House twenty miles away. He presented the Ikards with their first wedding gifts, two silver mint julep glasses stamped with "LBJ" on the bottom.

Ikard died in 1991 in Washington, D.C., of cardiac arrest.

Ikard is interred at Arlington National Cemetery. Jayne Ikard was Roman Catholic. She died in Washington, D.C., of emphysema at the age of eighty-three on August 27, 2010, and is interred alongside her husband at Arlington National Cemetery.

== Quotes ==
- Former Congressman Frank Ikard once wisecracked that Alan Greenspan is "the kind of person who knows how many thousands of flat-headed bolts were used in a Chevrolet and what it would do to the national economy if you took out three of them".

U.S. House of Representatives
Preceded by Ed Gossett	Member of the U.S. House of Representatives from Texas's 13th congressional district 1951–1961	Succeeded by Graham B. Purcell, Jr.
