= Andy Higginbottom =

English footballer

Personal information
- Full name: Andrew John Higginbottom
- Date of birth: 22 October 1964 (age 62)
- Place of birth: Chesterfield, England
- Height: 5 ft 10 in (1.78 m)
- Position: Defender

Senior career*
| Years | Team | Apps | (Gls) |
| 1982–1983 | Chesterfield | 3 | (0) |
| 1983–1984 | Everton | 0 | (0) |
| 1984–1985 | Cambridge United | 1 | (0) |
| 1985–1987 | Crystal Palace | 23 | (2) |
- Maidstone United
| Total | | 27 | (2) |
- * Club domestic league appearances and goals

Andrew John Higginbottom (born 22 October 1964) is an English former footballer who played in the Football League for Chesterfield, Cambridge United and Crystal Palace.
