= Business interruption insurance =

Insurance that covers lost income when normal business operations are disrupted

Business interruption insurance (also known as business income insurance) is a type of insurance that covers the loss of income that a business suffers after a disaster. The income loss covered may be due to disaster-related closing of the business facility or due to the rebuilding process after a disaster.

It differs from property insurance in that a property insurance policy only covers the physical damage to the business, while the additional coverage allotted by the business interruption policy covers the profits that would have been earned. This extra policy provision is applicable to all types of businesses, as it is designed to put a business in the same financial position it would have been in if no loss had occurred.

This type of coverage can be added onto the business's property insurance policy or comprehensive package policy such as a business owner's policy (BOP) or as part of a standalone policy in some jurisdictions. Since business interruption is included as part of the business's primary policy, it only pays out if the cause of the loss is covered by the overarching policy or a defined event in the case of a standalone.

== Coverage ==
The following are typically covered under a business interruption insurance policy:

- Profits. Profits that would have been earned (based on prior months' financial statements).
- Fixed costs. Operating expenses and other costs still being incurred by the property (based on historical costs).
- Temporary location. Some policies cover the extra expenses for moving to, and operating from, a temporary location.
- Commission and training cost. Business Interruption (BI) policy essentially covers the cost of providing training to the operators of the machinery replaced by the insurer following the insured events.
- Extra expenses. Reimbursement for reasonable expenses (beyond the fixed costs) that allow the business to continue operation while the property is being repaired.
- Civil authority ingress / egress. Government-mandated closure of business premises that directly causes loss of revenue. Examples include forced business closures because of government-issued curfews or street closures related to a covered event.

This coverage extends until the end of the business interruption period determined by the insurance policy. Most insurance policies define this period as starting on the date of the covered peril and the damaged property is physically repaired and returned to operations under the same condition that existed prior to the disaster.

In addition, businesses can purchase contingent business interruption coverage, which pays out when a business is unable to operate because of an event (such as a natural disaster) that damages the business premises of one of its suppliers or customers, thus preventing it from engaging in normal trade.
