= Harry Higginbotham =

Australian-born Scottish footballer

Personal information
- Date of birth: 27 July 1894
- Place of birth: Ashfield, Australia
- Date of death: 3 June 1950 (aged 55)
- Place of death: Springburn, Scotland
- Height: 5 ft 11 in (1.80 m)
- Position: Inside forward

Senior career*
Years	Team	Apps	(Gls)
- Kilsyth Rangers
1916–1919	St Mirren	58	(7)
1919–1920	South Shields	7	(0)
1920–1923	Luton Town	80	(25)
1923–1924	Clapton Orient	19	(1)
1924	Nelson	4	(0)
1924–1925	Reading	24	(3)
1925–1926	Mid Rhondda	?	(?)
1926	Pontypridd	?	(?)
- * Club domestic league appearances and goals

Harry B. Higginbotham (27 July 1894 – 3 June 1950) was a professional footballer who played mainly as an inside forward.

== Career ==
Born in New South Wales, Australia, Higginbotham emigrated to Scotland with his family in 1900, initially living in the Edinburgh area before moving to Glasgow. He represented Scotland at junior international level while playing for Kilsyth Rangers, then signed for St Mirren in 1916. After playing regularly as an outside right for the Buddies for two seasons during World War I (the Scottish Football League continued during the conflict for morale reasons) he made no appearances in a third campaign despite still being contracted to the Paisley club; this was possibly related to wartime commitments elsewhere, and he made guest appearances for several clubs including Hibernian and Third Lanark in Scotland and Fulham and Millwall in London.

In 1919 Higginbotham joined Football League Second Division side South Shields. He made seven league appearances for the club before moving to Luton Town the following year. He spent three seasons with the Bedfordshire club, scoring 25 goals in 80 league games. In February 1923, Higginbotham signed for Clapton Orient and went on to score once in 19 appearances for the team.

A year later, in February 1924, Higginbotham was signed by Nelson as the team battled to avoid relegation from the Second Division. He made his debut on 23 February 1924 in a 2–0 defeat away at Bury. Higginbotham went on to make three more league appearances for Nelson, including a 1–0 win against Manchester United at Old Trafford on 8 March. He left at the end of the 1923–24 season and subsequently joined Reading. During a single season with the Royals, he played 24 league matches and scored three goals. Higginbotham then had spells in Welsh football with Mid Rhondda and Pontypridd before returning to Scotland.
