= World's Largest Texas Flag =

Flag at the University of Texas at Austin

The World's Largest Texas Flag is a Texas flag used by the stadium handlers of the Alpha Rho chapter of Alpha Phi Omega (ΑΦΩ or APO), a national co-ed service fraternity, at the University of Texas at Austin in displays at football pre-game shows, at pep rallies, or for other purposes.

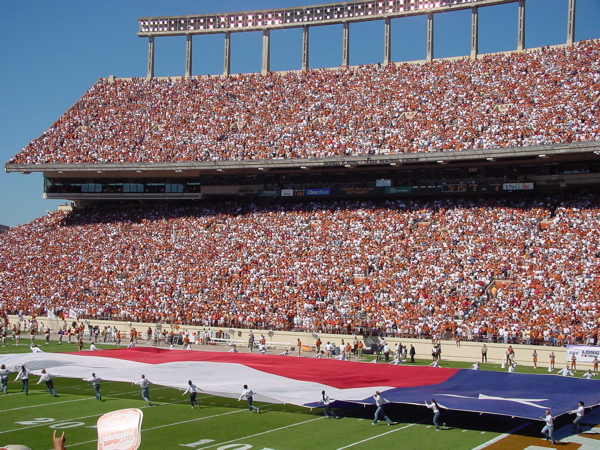
The World's Largest Texas Flag during a pre-game flag run

== Current flags ==
Three Texas Flags are currently in use, while a number have previously been used.

=== Field flag ===
The largest flag is used for pre-game "flag runs" at all home football games, at the annual Red River Shootout game, and at bowl games as allowed by bowl management. The newest incarnation of the Field Flag was purchased in July 2007. It measures 100 feet in width and 150 feet in length and was made by the Dixie Flag & Banner Company in San Antonio, TX.

The former flag (still used for some occasions) measures 75 feet in width and 125 feet in length (23 by 38 meters), and is the first of the flags to have the 3:5 ratio. This flag was purchased in 1991.

=== Drop flag ===
A smaller flag is used for pep rallies, Forty Acres Fest and other special events that take place in front of the university's Main Building. Its measurements are 75' in width and 125' in length and was purchased in 1991. This flag was originally used as a field flag. The flag is lowered from the President's Balcony.

The previous drop flag was purchased in the mid-1970s, measured 66' wide by 120' long, and was originally used as a field flag.

=== Parade flag ===
A much smaller flag with knobs to be used for the Texas-OU Torchlight Parade, other parades in Austin as requested, and for flag runs before some home basketball games. This flag was purchased in 1998, and it is 50 ft long and 30 ft wide.

== History ==
The original flag was given to Texas governor Price Daniel by Mississippi governor Ross Barnett during the halftime show of the 1962 Cotton Bowl (after which Texas beat Ole Miss 12-7). The flag was meant as a gesture of southern hospitality from the citizens of Mississippi to the citizens of Texas. Governor Daniel later gave the flag to the Longhorn Band. The band later, however, returned the flag to the university where it eventually made its way to the men's athletic department. The next football season, APO was asked to run the flag and the first APO flag run was at the Thanksgiving Day game in 1962 against Texas A&M. The original Texas flag measured 17 yards by 30 yards (51 feet by 90 feet). The second Texas flag was made and came into APO's possession around 1966. Not much is known about this flag because the records have not survived. It is assumed to be roughly the same size as the first flag.

== See also ==
- Texas Longhorns
