= William S. Ikard =

William Susan "Sude" Ikard (July 7, 1847 in Noxubee County, Mississippi – September 13, 1934 in Henrietta, Texas) was a Texas cattle rancher. Ikard is credited with bringing the first Hereford cattle to Texas, in 1876. These cattle "became the nucleus of the state's Hereford industry." He cofounded the Cattle Raisers Association of Texas (now the Texas and Southwestern Cattle Raisers Association). In 2004, Ikard was inducted into the Heritage Hall of Honor at the Cotton Bowl for his contributions to ranching. He was the grandfather of U.S. Congressman Frank N. Ikard.
