= Business owner's policy =

Type of insurance coverage

A business owner's policy (also businessowner's policy, business owners policy or BOP) is a special type of commercial insurance designed for small and medium-sized businesses. BOPs are cost-effective and convenient for business owners, as they provide comprehensive protection against common risks like property damage, lawsuits, and income loss due to unforeseen events. By bundling general liability insurance and property insurance into a single policy, BOPs typically offer a reduced premium, often making them a more cost-effective option than separately purchased policies.

Specific coverage included in a business owner's policy varies among insurance providers, but most policies require that businesses meet eligibility criteria to qualify.

== Standard Coverage ==
A typical business owner's policy includes property and liability insurance.

The property insurance portion of a BOP is available most often as named-peril coverage, which provides compensation only for damage caused by events specifically listed in the policy (typically fire, explosion, wind damage, vandalism, smoke damage, etc.). Some BOPs offer open-peril or “all-risk” coverage; this option is available from the “special” BOP form rather than the “standard.” Types of property covered by a BOP usually include:

- Buildings: Owned or rented business premises, additions and additions in progress, outdoor fixtures.
- Personal business property: Any items owned by the business or business owner or owned by a third party but kept temporarily in the care, custody or control of the business or business owner. To be covered by a BOP, business property must be stored or kept in specified proximity of business premises (e.g., within 100 feet of the premises).

In addition, many business owner's policies include business interruption insurance as part of their property coverage. Business interruption insurance provides up to 12 months’ income for covered businesses when they are forced to shut down operations because of a covered property event.

The liability portion of a business owner's policy offers coverage for third parties who suffer property damage, advertising injury or personal injury on a covered business's premises or caused by the business's owner or employees. This coverage typically takes the form of compensation for legal fees related to third-party lawsuits over such incidents (including lawyers’ fees, settlements and court costs). In addition, BOP liability coverage may include compensation for medical expenses that result from an injury to a third party on a covered business's premises for up to one year after the incident occurs. In addition to standard coverages, most insurance providers offer optional additions or endorsements on business owner's policies that business owners can use to tailor a policy to their specific needs.

== Exclusions & Optional Coverages ==
Business owner's policies do not include the following types of insurance:

- Liquor liability insurance for businesses that sell or manufacture alcohol.
- Professional liability insurance
- Workers’ compensation
- Health insurance
- Disability insurance
- Auto insurance

Many insurance companies offer businesses the option to customize a BOP based on specific coverage needs. Optional property endorsements that can be added to a BOP include coverage for certain crimes, spoilage of merchandise, computer equipment, mechanical breakdown, forgery and fidelity bond, but the coverage limits for these inclusions are typically low.

== Eligibility ==
Business owner's policies are not available to every business. Eligibility requirements vary among insurance providers, but the typical business that is eligible for a business owner's policy:

- Has fewer than 100 employees
- Has a small office, workplace, or other premises
- Makes less than $1 million in annual revenue
- Operates in a low-risk industry
- Needs less than 12 months of business interruption insurance
