= Ronald Shelp =

American businessman and writer

Ronald Kent Shelp (September 29, 1941 to August 15, 2021) was the author of Fallen Giant: The Amazing Story of Hank Greenberg and the History of AIG. Shelp worked for Maurice "Hank" Greenberg, CEO of American International Group, for 12 years, ultimately serving as worldwide head of government relations. Fallen Giant is a 2006 non-fiction book that tracks AIG from its first business transaction in China in 1919, through its growth into a global financial services powerhouse, to Greenberg's exit in 2005 after accusations of fraud by New York Attorney General Eliot Spitzer. The contributions of C.V. Starr, AIG's founder, and Greenberg, who led the company for 37 years, are chronicled in the book. It was updated several times during the 2008 financial crisis, when the US government seized control of AIG by lending the company $85 billion in exchange for a 79.9% equity stake, making the American taxpayer AIG's largest shareholder. Fallen Giant was translated and published in China, Taiwan, and Korea.

Shelp met Greenberg early in his career when he led the insurance industry group at the U.S. Chamber of Commerce. He was an advocate for trade in services, which was outlined in his book, Beyond Industrialization: Ascendancy of the Global Service Economy. While at AIG he served on the board of American International Underwriters Corporation (AIUC) and other AIG subsidiary boards. Shelp was later president and CEO of the New York City Partnership and New York Chamber of Commerce. He is a member of the Council on Foreign Relations and writes about AIG and Greenberg on his Forbes.com blog, Greenberg Watch.

Shelp is a graduate of the Johns Hopkins School of Advanced International Studies. He received his baccalaureate from the University of Georgia, and pursued doctoral studies at the London School of Economics. He died in 2021 in his home in Manhattan.

== Bibliography ==
- Lowenstein, Roger. "The Foundation, and the Flaws, of an Empire", The New York Times. December 17, 2006.
- Francesco Guerrera; Andrea Felsted (2008-10-06). "Inadequate Cover". Financial Times.
- Cypel, Sylvain. "La revanche de M. Greenberg." LE MONDE. March 10, 2009., accessed August 2, 2011
- Shelp, Ron. "AIA's New Deal." The Wall Street Journal. November 2, 2010.
- Shelp, Ron. "The End of AIG's Asian Era." The Wall Street Journal Business Asia. March 4, 2010: n. page. Print.
- Quinn, James. Lehman collpase: analysis at a premium in run-up to AIG’s failure." The Telegraph. September 17, 2009.
- Shelp, Ronald K. "The Hollowing of New York." The New York Times. February 1, 1992.
- "New President Named At 2 Business Groups." The New York Times. August 26, 1987.
- Ron Shelp (1986–87). "Trade in Services". Foreign Policy. 65: 64–84.
- Shelp, Ronald K. and Gary W. Hart. "Understanding a New Economy." The Wall Street Journal. December 3, 1986. Print.
