= Morefar Back O'Beyond =

American golf course

Morefar Back O'Beyond Golf Club
- Location within Connecticut
- 41.4095°N 73.5432°W

Club information
- Location: Danbury, Connecticut and Southeast, New York
- Established: 1964
- Type: Private
- Total holes: 18
- Course rating: 73.7
- Slope rating: 138

Morefar Back O'Beyond is a secretive, little-used private golf course located on 500 acres (2.0 km^{2}) in both Danbury, Connecticut and Southeast, New York. The course can be seen from portions of the Richter Park public course and has garnered local rumor as to its origin and ownership.

Course officials do not cooperate with the press seeking information about the facility. It appears the course was established in 1964 (some sources say 1962) by Cornelius Vander Starr who had founded the company later known as AIG over forty years before. His ashes are interred on the fifteenth tee. In 2006, it was owned by Starr International, a Bermuda-based company long associated with AIG and the Starr family. It is currently controlled by Maurice Greenberg, former AIG Chief Executive Officer. Starr International also does not discuss the facility.

In 2010, press reports stated the course was owned by the private Back O' Beyond Inc., based in Brewster.

It appears memberships are not available to the public and the course may only be used by employees of Starr International. Some companies associated with AIG and the financial sector were able to host functions at the club in the mid-2000s. Sculptures dot the course.

The course, a par 69, measures 6748 yards. Edward C. Ryder (d. 1986) and Val Carlson are credited as its designers. Edward C. Ryder is also known for designing the nearby Richter Park Golf Course.

The course includes a restaurant and full bar. Walking is not allowed on the course; players must use a cart. The course also has a small driving range.

Victor Boyd is the general manager. David Thompson is the course pro.
