= Logos and uniforms of the New York Yankees =

Official playing gear of American sports club

The New York Yankees are an American professional baseball team that compete in Major League Baseball. The franchise is one of the most recognizable in sports history, and its visual identity—particularly the interlocking "NY" logo and the traditional pinstriped uniform—has become an iconic symbol of both the team and the city of New York. The Yankees’ uniforms have remained largely unchanged for decades, emphasizing a classic design that contrasts with more frequently updated styles used by other teams. Over time, the Yankees logo and cap have become widely adopted in fashion and popular culture around the world.

== Team logos and insignia ==
Primary logo

Cap insignia

Jersey insignia

Print insignia (Note: Featured prominently in marketing, is painted behind home plate at the Stadium, and appears on the team’s batting helmets.)

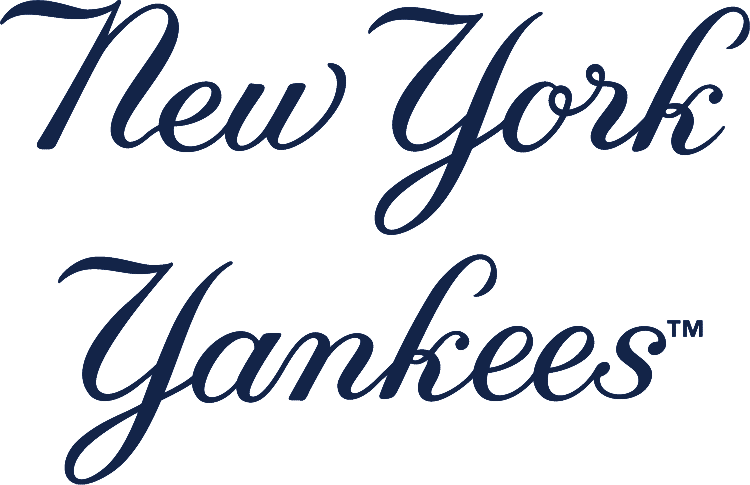
Wordmark logo

Throughout much of their tenure as the Highlanders, the logo was variations of a stylized N and Y, which lay separately on either side of the jersey's breast. In 1905, the two overlapped for one season, but not in the way used today. It wasn't until 1909 that the team changed to the familiar interlocking NY that would be the team logo long after the team became known as the Yankees, and would continue to be the cap insignia until today. The interlocking NY was originally designed by Tiffany & Co. and struck on a medal of valor presented in 1877 to John McDowell, a New York City police officer shot in the line of duty.

The primary logo, created in 1946 by sports artist Henry Alonzo Keller, consists of "Yankees" against a baseball, written in red script with a red bat forming the vertical line of the K, an Uncle Sam hat hanging from the barrel. The logo was slightly changed over the years, with the current version first appearing in the 1970s.

The interlocking NY has varied greatly, and there are currently three major versions in use. The first is the cap insignia, in which the N and Y are of about the same size and unadorned. The second is the logo on the breast of the home jersey. This logo first appeared there in 1912, continued through the 1913 renaming to the New York Yankees, and after disappearing in 1917, returned for good in 1936, although there have been many small but apparent changes through the years. In the jersey logo, the Y is larger, the letters more blocky, and the curves more exaggerated. The third is the print logo, which is used extensively in marketing, is painted behind home plate at the Stadium, and appears on the team's batting helmets. The N is larger and more curved, and the letters have large serifs at the end.

The Yankees use a block letter "NEW YORK" wordmark in navy blue on the gray road uniform. There is also a print version of the full name, which is of a more fanciful script than the name appears in the team logo.

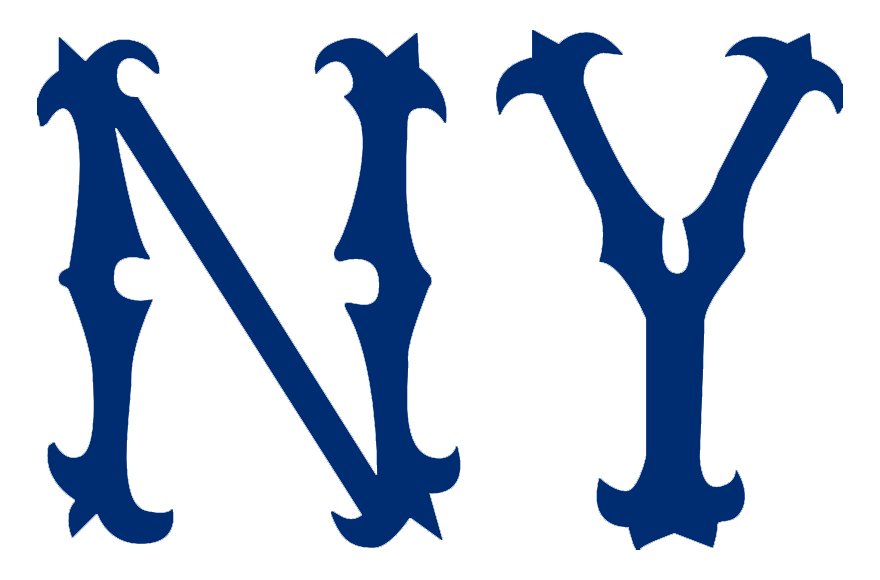
Early "NY" logo of the New York Highlanders, 1904

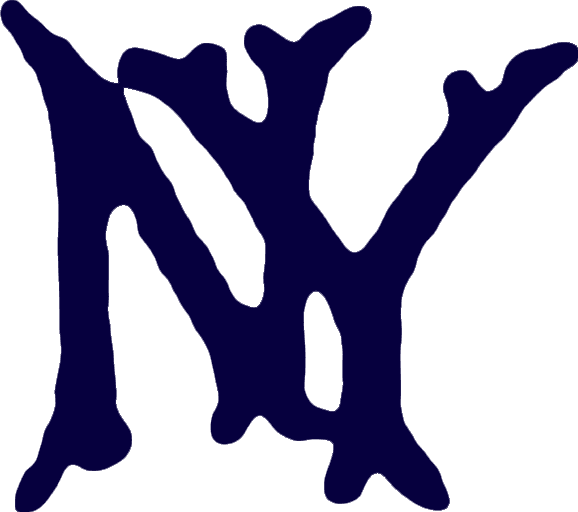
Overlapping version of the "NY" logo, 1905

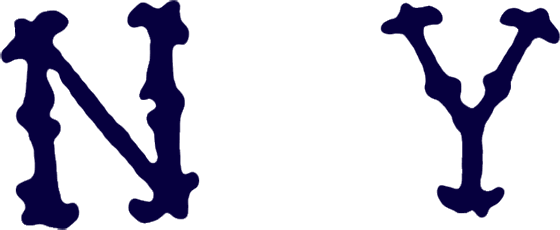
Another "NY" logo variation, 1908

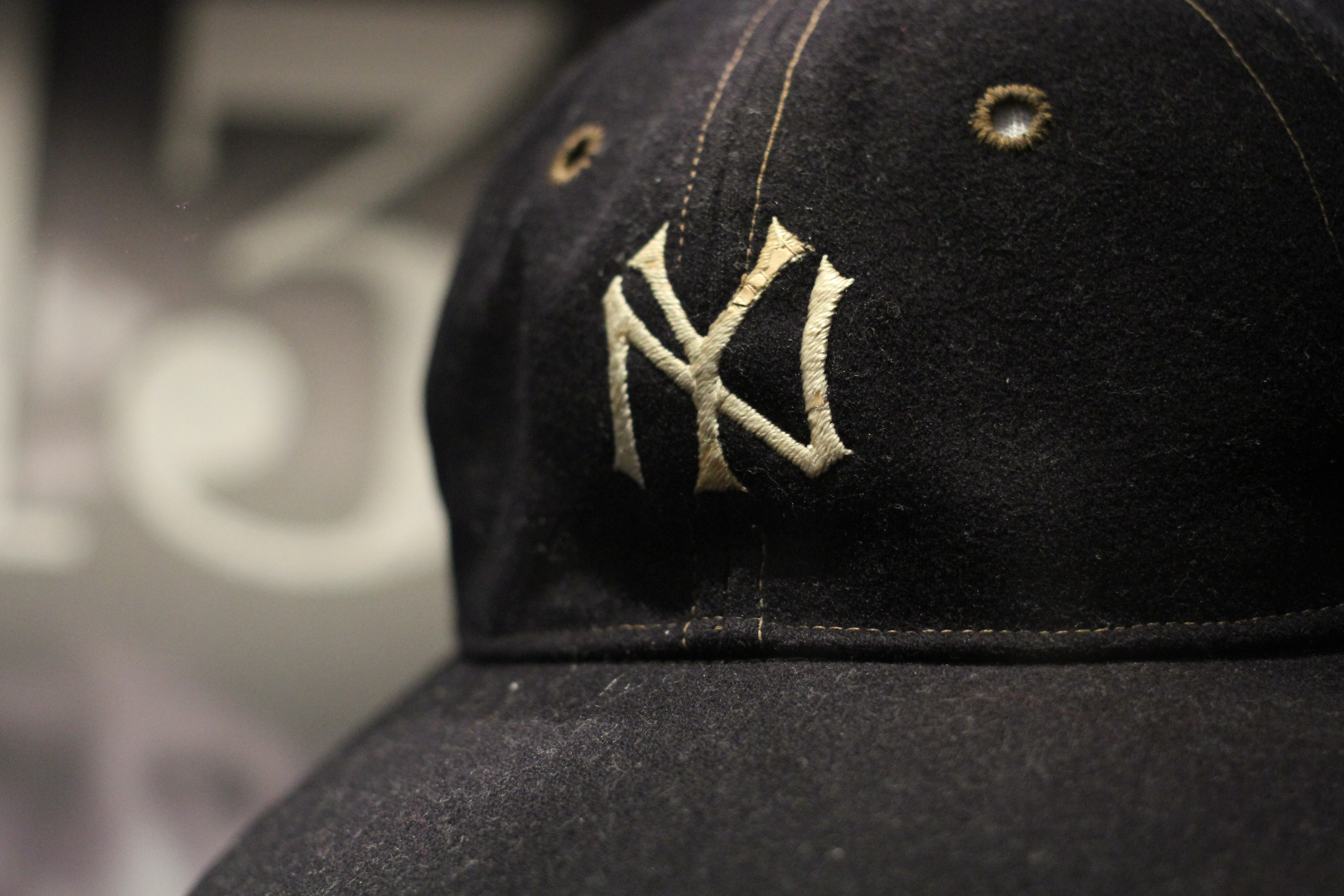
The first version of the interlocking "NY" logo, introduced in 1909

== Design and appearance of uniforms ==
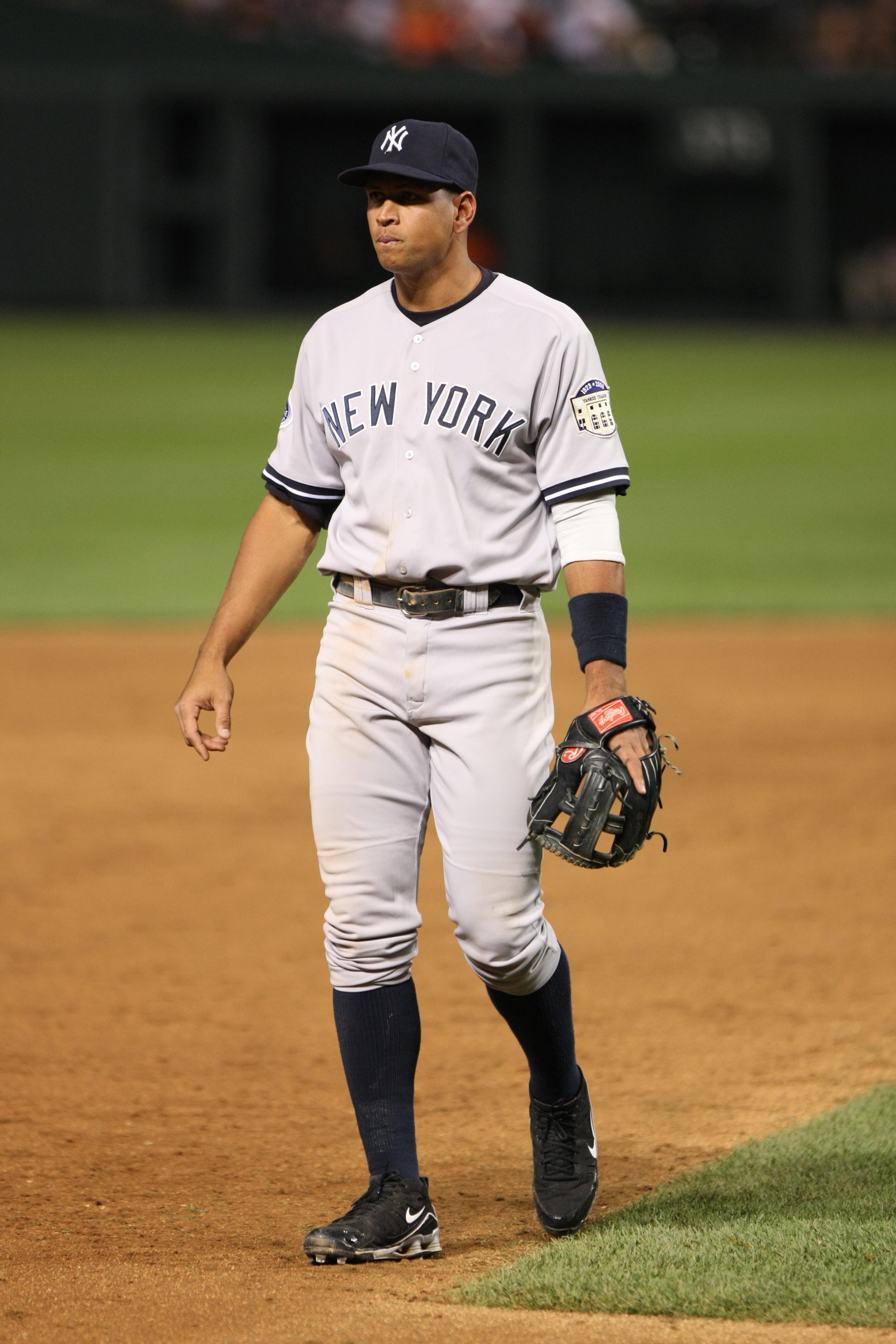
Alex Rodriguez in the 1973–2023 away uniform.

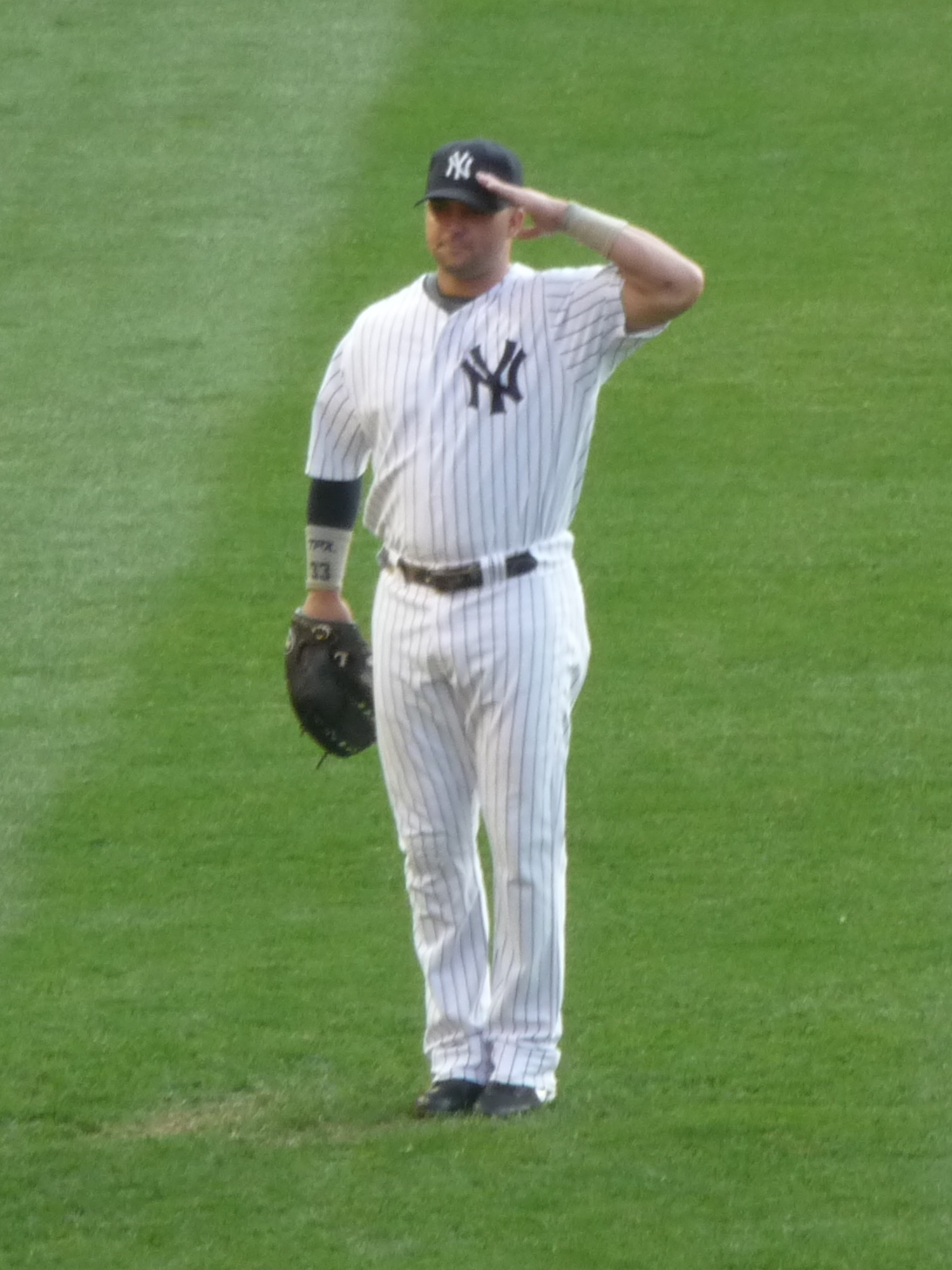
Nick Swisher in the regular pinstriped home uniform.

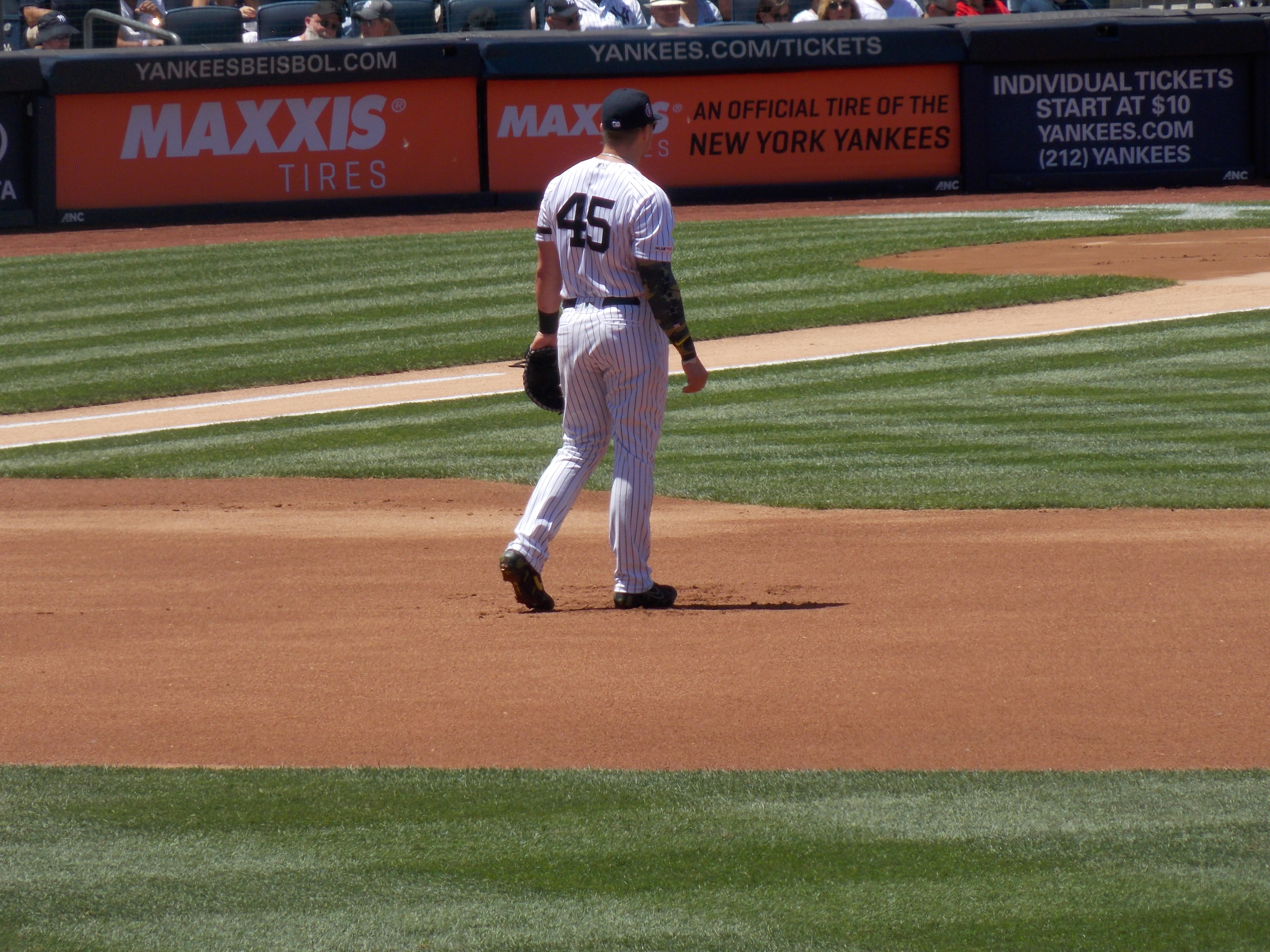
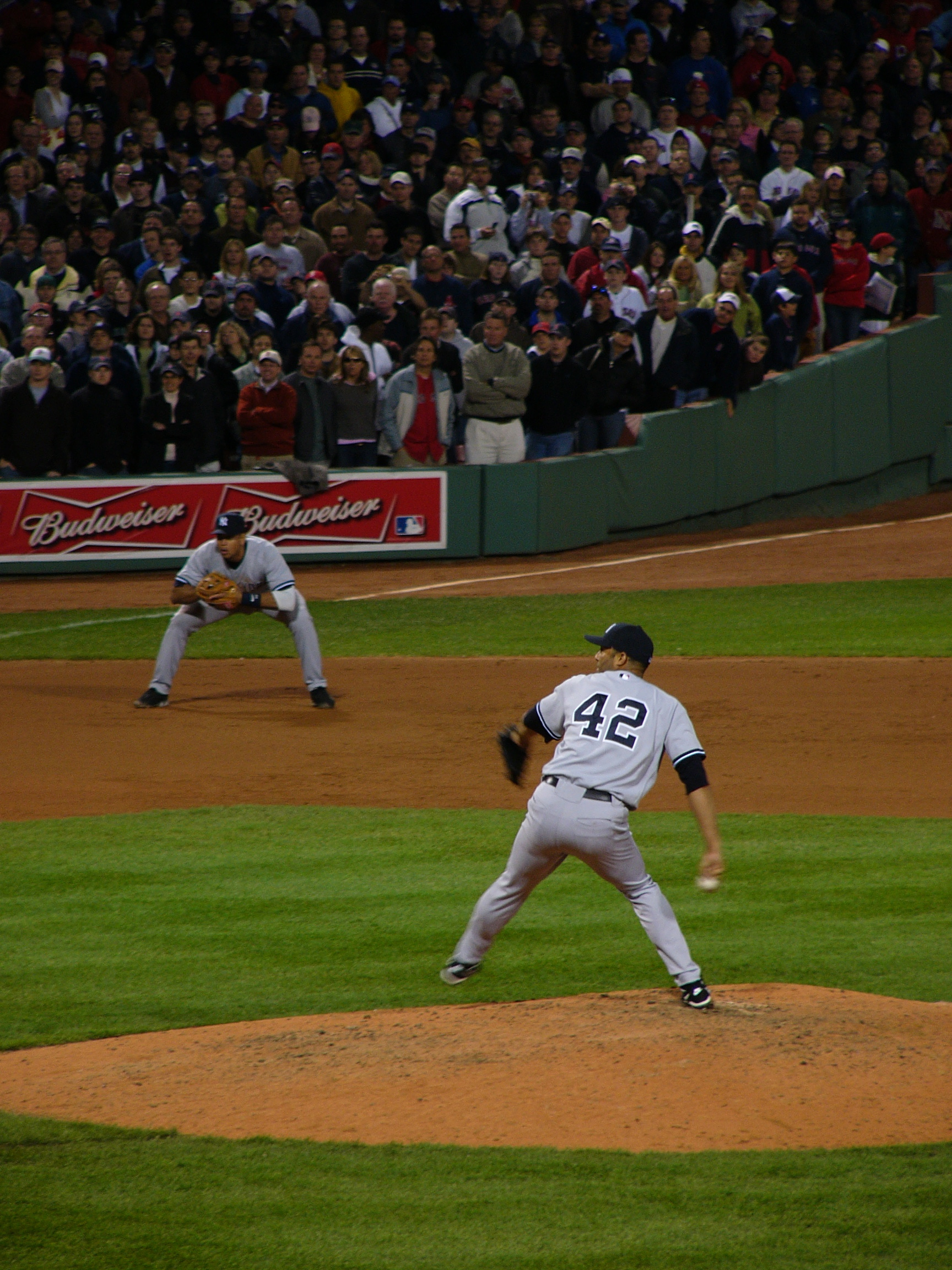
The Yankees do not have names on the back of either of their uniforms, as seen on Luke Voit (left) and Mariano Rivera (right).

The Yankees' official uniform colors are midnight navy blue and white. The home uniform is white with distinctive pinstripes and a navy interlocking "NY" at the chest. The away uniform is gray with "NEW YORK" written across the chest in navy blue. The road uniform had the "NEW YORK" wordmark in midnight navy blue outlined in white and the sleeves in navy-white-navy stripes on the sleeve cuff until 2024. The player number is on the back of the uniform jersey in navy (outlined in white on the road jersey until 2024), and is not accompanied by the player's name. A navy blue cap with a white interlocking "NY" logo is worn with both uniforms.

Contrary to baseball legend, the Yankees did not start wearing pinstriped uniforms to make Babe Ruth look slimmer in the late 1920s and 1930s. In truth, the Yankees briefly added pinstripes to their uniforms in 1912, then re-added them on a permanent basis soon after Jacob Ruppert bought the team in 1915.

In 1929, the New York Yankees became the first team to make numbers a permanent part of the uniform. Numbers were handed out based on the batting order in the lineup. In 1929, Earle Combs wore #1, Mark Koenig #2, Babe Ruth #3, Lou Gehrig #4, Bob Meusel #5, Tony Lazzeri #6, Leo Durocher #7, Johnny Grabowski #8, Benny Bengough #9, and Bill Dickey #10. Up until 2019, the team had never issued #0, and still has never issued #00. When other teams began putting names on the backs of jerseys in the 1960s, the Yankees did not follow suit. Many companies have created replica Yankee jerseys and other apparel with the player name above the number on the back for fans to purchase, but the only official Yankee uniforms that have ever had names on the back are special uniforms used during MLB's Players Weekend, an annual event first held on August 25–27, 2017. Apart from the Players Weekend jerseys, the Yankees were the only team in Major League Baseball that did not display the logo of the official uniform supplier on game jerseys or pants supplied to players; that trend would change as Nike took over as MLB uniform supplier in 2020.

Beginning in the 2010 season, the MLB logo on the back collar of their jerseys has had gray behind the bat of the MLB logo instead of the usual red, which had been there since 2000, when all Major League teams started wearing the MLB logo on the back collar.

In 2023, Major League Baseball allowed teams to add jersey sponsors, and the Yankees were no exception. On July 12, the team announced a sponsorship deal with Starr Insurance, which would see the Yankees wear a navy blue patch with the Starr logo on either sleeve, depending on a player's handedness.

=== Proposed road uniform change ===
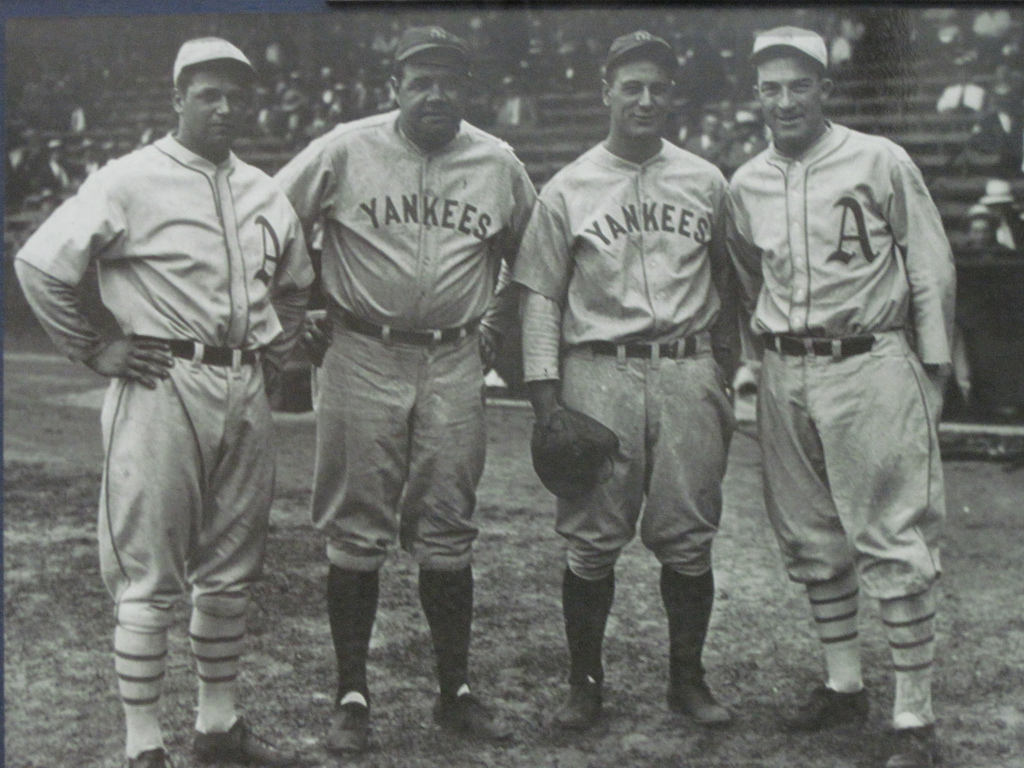
Left: Babe Ruth and Lou Gehrig wearing the road uniform of 1927–1930 with "YANKEES" in place of "NEW YORK". Right: Aaron Judge in the modified road uniform introduced in 2024, which removes the white outline and sleeve trim, echoing the club’s pre-1973 road style. The Starr Insurance sponsor patch was added in 2023.

Although the Yankees had worn the same road uniform since 1918 (except 1927 to 1930, when the arched "NEW YORK" was replaced by the word "YANKEES"), a radical change was proposed in 1974. Marty Appel, in his book Now Pitching for the Yankees, describes the proposed uniforms:

In 1974 I walked into (then-General Manager) Gabe Paul's office to find samples of new Yankee road uniforms draped across his sofa. They were the opposite of the home pinstripes – they were navy with white pinstripes. The NY logo was in white. Gabe liked them. I nearly fainted. Although the drab gray road uniforms were not exciting, with the plain NEW YORK across the chest, they were just as much the Yankees' look as were the home uniforms. I think my dramatic disdain helped saved [sic] the day and saved the Yankees from wearing those awful pajamas on the field.

The Yankees did, however, make some minor updates to the road jersey that season, including adding blue and white trim to the sleeve cuffs and a white outline to the jersey numbers and the "NEW YORK" arch. This road uniform design was in use through the 2016 season, when the spacing between "NEW" and "YORK" was tightened up. The white outlining and sleeve trim were both eliminated in 2024, returning the uniform to a solid gray jersey with blue NEW YORK across the chest. The change was made at the suggestion of team captain Aaron Judge, who had "loved the look" of throwback uniforms worn in 2021.

=== Cap changes ===
In 1992, the Yankees, along with all MLB teams, had an MLB logo added to the back of their caps for the first time. The following year, the Yankees became one of the last teams to wear a cap with a green underbrim. They did not switch to a gray underbrim until 1994, when most teams had been wearing a gray underbrim since the late 1980s. The Yankees, along with all MLB teams, switched from wool caps to synthetics beginning in 2007. The new caps now have a black underbrim to reduce glare.

=== Alternate uniform ===
For years, the Yankees had been the only team in Major League Baseball to shun the trend of creating an alternate third jersey, even refusing to adopt a new City Connect jersey that 28 other teams use (the only other team being the Athletics, who are in the process of relocating to Las Vegas from Oakland.) They do, however, wear navy blue versions of their home and road uniform tops, but only during spring training; under MLB's new "4+1" rule in uniforms, the Yankees' spring training tops count within the four-uniform limit. In 2026, after a reported request from multiple players on the team, the Yankees designated the navy blue versions of their road uniform tops as their official "alternate road uniform". However, these uniforms have not yet been worn in a regular season game.

== Special uniforms and caps ==
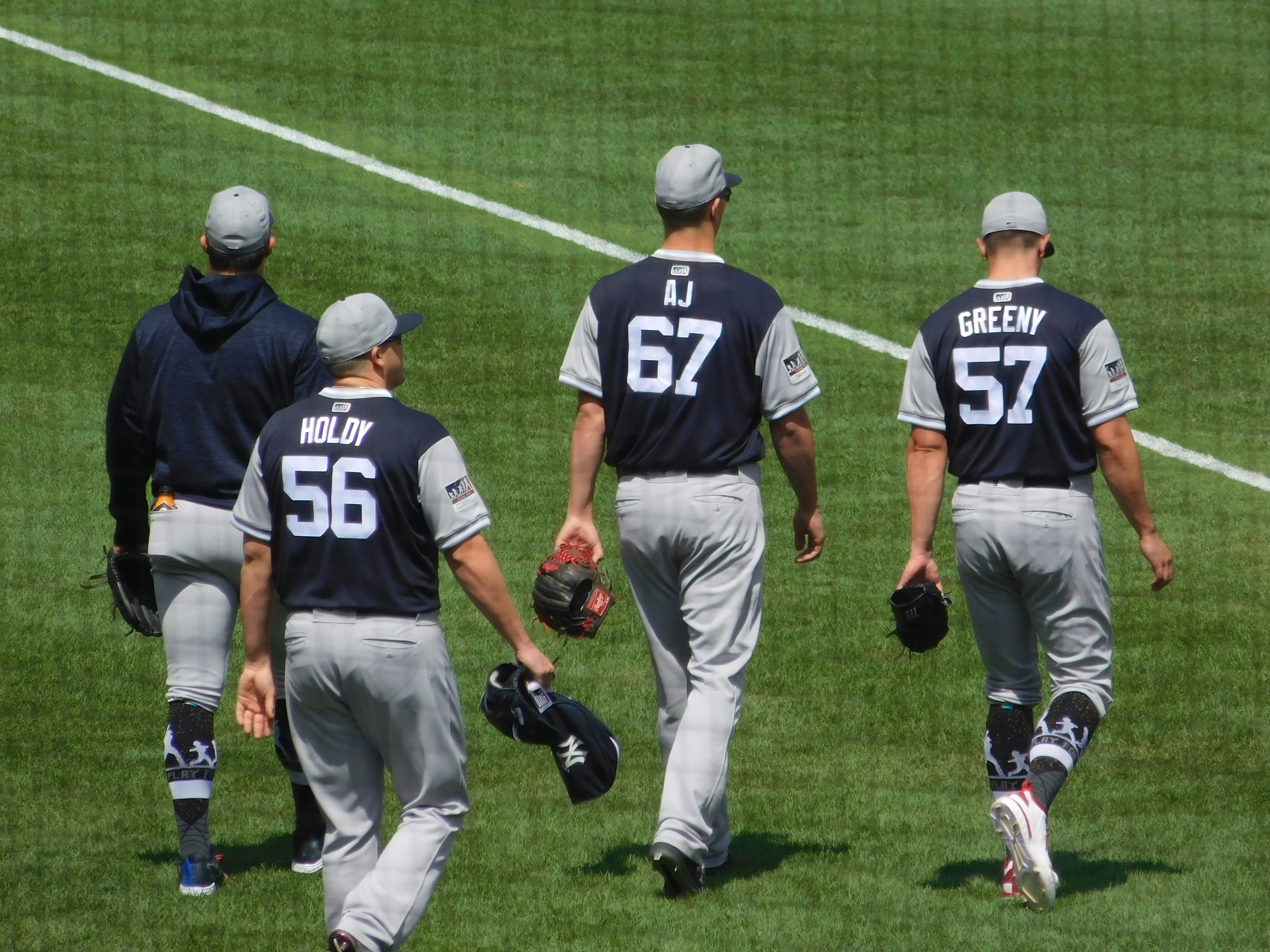
2018 Players Weekend uniforms worn by Jonathan Holder ("HOLDY", left), A. J. Cole ("AJ", center), and Chad Green ("GREENY", right).

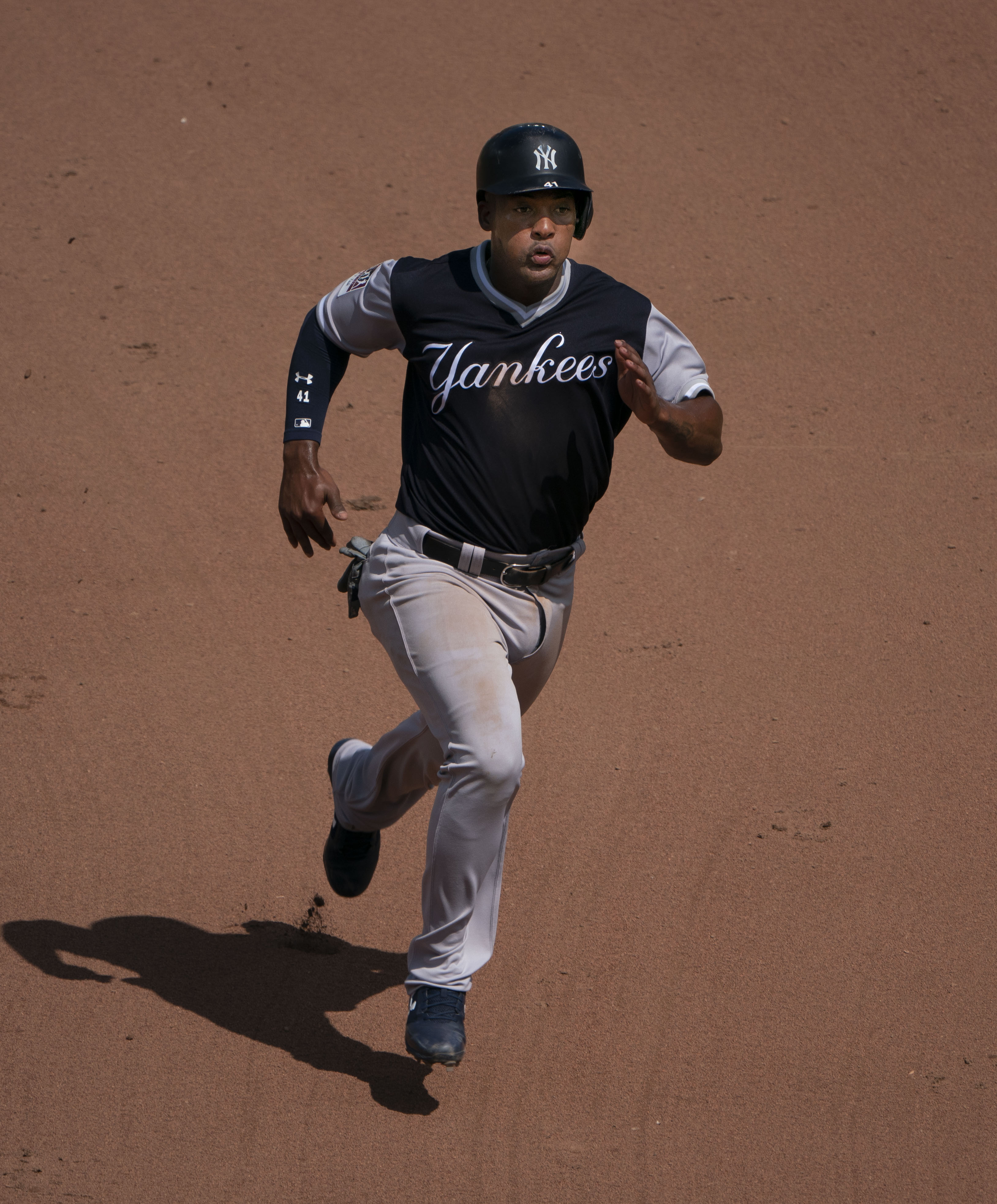
Miguel Andújar wearing the 2018 Players Weekend uniform, which showcased the Yankees script wordmark on a Yankees uniform for the first time.

The home uniform has been the same (apart from minor changes) since 1936, longer than any current uniform design in Major League Baseball, though patches commemorating milestones or special events may be worn for all or part of a season. In addition, the team will occasionally wear a black armband on the left sleeve, usually in honor of a Yankee great who has died. In some cases, the player's number is displayed instead. The first time was in 1990, when the Yankees wore a #1 patch on their left sleeve in tribute to Billy Martin, who had died in a car crash on December 25, 1989. They did likewise for Mickey Mantle (#7) in 1995, Joe DiMaggio (#5) in 1999, Phil Rizzuto (#10) in 2007, Yogi Berra (#8) in late 2015 and all of 2016, and Whitey Ford (#16) for the 2020 American League Division Series in Game 5.

In 1938, the Yankees, the New York Giants, and the Brooklyn Dodgers wore a patch on their left sleeves in honor of the upcoming 1939 World's Fair in New York. In 1939 and again in 1969, the Yankees, like all Major League teams, wore a patch on the left sleeve that marked a baseball centennial; in 1994, they and all other teams wore a patch commemorating the 125th anniversary. In 1952, the Yankees wore a patch celebrating the team's 50th season. In 1973, the left sleeve featured a patch commemorating the 50th anniversary of the original Yankee Stadium, in the final season before the Stadium's two-year renovation. For the 2008 season, the team wore a patch commemorating the 2008 All-Star Game, another commemorating the final season in the original Yankee Stadium, and a black armband to honor Bobby Murcer, who died on July 12, 2008, due to complications related to brain cancer. In 2009, the jersey's left sleeve featured a patch commemorating the inaugural season at the current Yankee Stadium.

Upon the deaths of owner George Steinbrenner and longtime public address announcer Bob Sheppard within days of one another in July 2010, the Yankees sported two patches from July 16 until the end of the 2010 season: a left breast patch in memory of Steinbrenner, and a left shoulder patch in memory of Sheppard. They added a black armband in memory of Ralph Houk after his death on July 21.

In the final homestand of the 2013 season, the team wore a patch honoring the retiring Mariano Rivera; and they did likewise for Derek Jeter in the final month of the 2014 season, leading up to his retirement.

After the death of long-time Yankees announcer John Sterling in May 2026, the Yankees sported a sleeve patch featuring a microphone in Sterling's honor from May 18 until the end of the 2026 season.

Likewise, the cap has seen commemorative patches or other temporary alterations. In the 1996 World Series, the Yankees, along with the Atlanta Braves, became the first teams to wear their caps with World Series patches sewn on the side. In 1998, the Yankees had the number #39 sewn on the back of their caps, next to the MLB logo, for Darryl Strawberry, because he was suffering from colon cancer at the time. The Yankees wore a patch for the 100th Anniversary of the American League on the side of the caps for their opening series in 2001. When the Yankees celebrated their 100th Anniversary in 2003, they had a patch on the side of their caps commemorating it as well. In 2009, to celebrate the inaugural season at the new Yankee Stadium, the Yankees had an inaugural season patch on the back of their caps. It is the first time in MLB history that a patch was on the back of a cap instead of just the MLB logo. (However, the Yankees players that played in the 2009 Major League Baseball All-Star Game had the regular MLB logo on the back of their caps.)

The Yankees have worn throwback uniforms on three special occasions. In 1996, the Yankees wore the uniforms of the New York Black Yankees on a day celebrating Negro league baseball. In 2012, the Yankees wore replicas of their 1912 uniforms, with an alternate interlocking N-Y logo and without numbers, for a game celebrating Fenway Park's centennial. In 2021, the Yankees wore replicas of their 1921 road uniforms for the inaugural MLB at Field of Dreams game against the Chicago White Sox.

During a July 4, 2008, game against the Boston Red Sox, the Yankees wore a special stars-and-stripes cap with an American flag pattern inside the interlocking NY. It was "thought to be the first time in their history" that the Yankees had worn a special edition cap. All other teams in Major League Baseball, including the Red Sox, sported similar designs inside their cap logos.

In 2009, as a Memorial Day promotion, the Yankees donned red caps with stars-and-stripes logos for a May 25 game against the Texas Rangers. The Yankees also wore these caps for a July 4 game against the Toronto Blue Jays and for a September 11 game against the Baltimore Orioles. The latter game is particularly notable, as it was the game in which Derek Jeter earned his 2,722nd base hit, breaking the franchise record held by Lou Gehrig.

During the 2010 season, the Yankees wore special off-white caps with a similar stars-and-stripes logo in games played on Memorial Day, Independence Day weekend, and Patriot Day. All United States–based teams wore similarly styled caps on these days. (The one Canadian franchise wore a Maple Leaf design, owing to their national emblem.)

For Memorial Day 2013 (May 27), each Major League Baseball club wore caps and jerseys "featuring an authentic military digital camouflage design licensed from the United States Marine Corps." The Yankees, playing on the road at Citi Field, wore camouflage caps with a white "NY", and jerseys with camouflage "New York" on the front and camouflage numbers on the back.

The Yankees' uniform for 2017 Players Weekend was part of a league-wide initiative in which all 30 teams used special color pullover jerseys with contrasting sleeves, inspired by uniforms frequently used by youth baseball teams. All teams also wore special caps. Since the weekend coincided with the final days of the 2017 Little League World Series, all jerseys bore a unique logo that drew design cues from the MLB and Little League logos. The Yankees jersey was navy with gray sleeves featuring the "YANKEES" script used since 1950, and the team used a gray cap with the traditional interlocking "NY" logo. Also, as part of the initiative, all uniforms had names on the back (a first for any official Yankees uniform), and players were encouraged to place nicknames instead of family names on their jerseys; for example, Aaron Judge's uniform that weekend had "ALL RISE" on the back. Brett Gardner and Tyler Austin became the first Yankees ever to have their last names on the back of their uniforms. For the 2018 Players Weekend, most Yankees used nicknames, but Greg Bird, Jacoby Ellsbury, Brett Gardner, Ben Heller, and Judge used their last names.

== Personal appearance policy ==
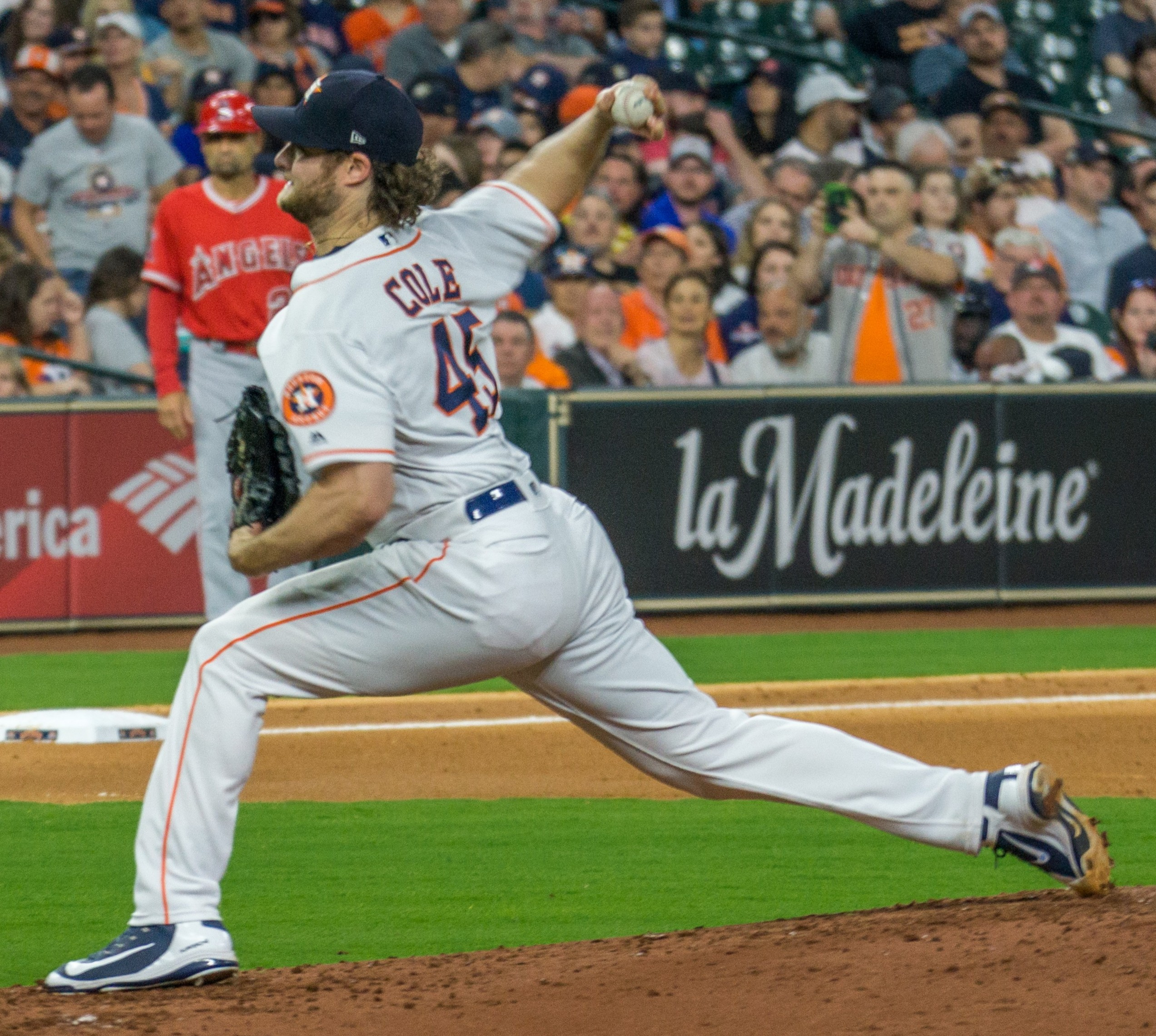
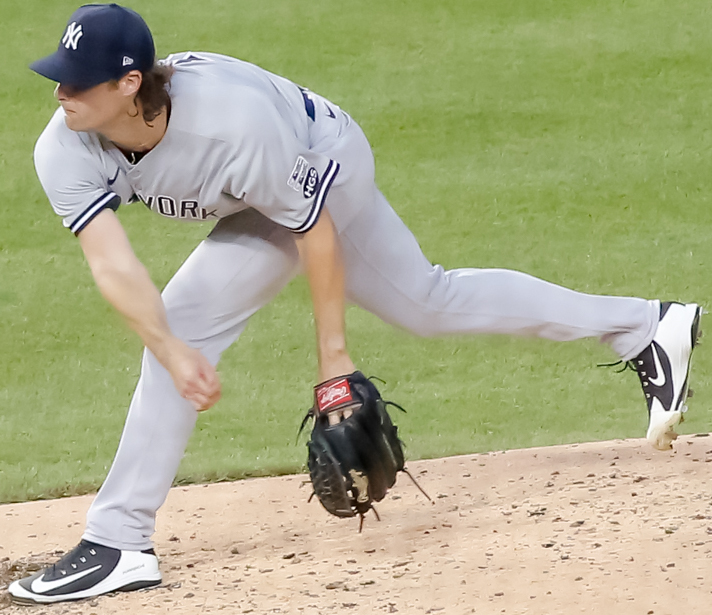
Gerrit Cole with a full beard as a member of the Houston Astros in 2018 (top), and clean-shaven as a member of the New York Yankees in 2020 (bottom).

The Yankees were the only MLB team with a personal appearance policy, and attracted notoriety for enforcing it. Under George Steinbrenner, long hair and facial hair below the lip were prohibited; the practice continued under Hal Steinbrenner when he assumed control of the Yankees after the 2008 season. In the past, visible tattoos were also prohibited, and players wore navy arm bands to cover them, although this practice has since been discontinued. In 2025, the Yankees amended their appearance policy, permitting players and coaches to have "well-groomed beards".

Many players, including Reggie Jackson, Jeff Reardon, Roger Clemens, Kevin Youkilis, Jason Giambi, Gary Sheffield, Johnny Damon, Andrew McCutchen, and Randy Johnson either had long hair, significant facial hair, or both before playing for the Yankees, but were clean-cut by the time they had their press conferences unveiling them as members of the Yankees.

There were some defiances of the appearance policy, however. The most notable incident involved pitcher Goose Gossage, who had a horseshoe mustache in deliberate defiance of George Steinbrenner. Jackson, though he currently sports only a mustache as a "special assistant" with the organization, did have a full beard during parts of his stay with the Yankees. Don Mattingly, the face of the franchise for the 1980s and the first half of the 1990s, was briefly benched in 1991 for letting his hair grow too long, and the team did not let him play until it was cut, but he was eventually reinserted into the lineup after it became apparent that he was not going to cut it.

Several players, including Clemens, Giambi, Sheffield, Johnson, Damon, Andrew Miller, David Wells, and Joba Chamberlain, grew significant facial hair after they departed from the organization. Journeyman outfielder Darnell McDonald had long dreadlocks throughout his career and had to cut them when joining the Yankees, despite only being on their roster for three days when the Yankees released him.

The Yankees were so well known for their appearance policy that players for other teams were rumored to be signing for the Yankees if they adopted a clean-cut look before actually signing with them. In December 2012, San Francisco Giants pitcher Tim Lincecum, known for his long locks, cut his hair short. Although his hair was also short during his rookie season with the Giants in 2007, one Twitter commenter joked that he may have been preparing to play for the Yankees in 2014, since he was entering a contract year with the Giants in 2013.

== Use in fashion ==
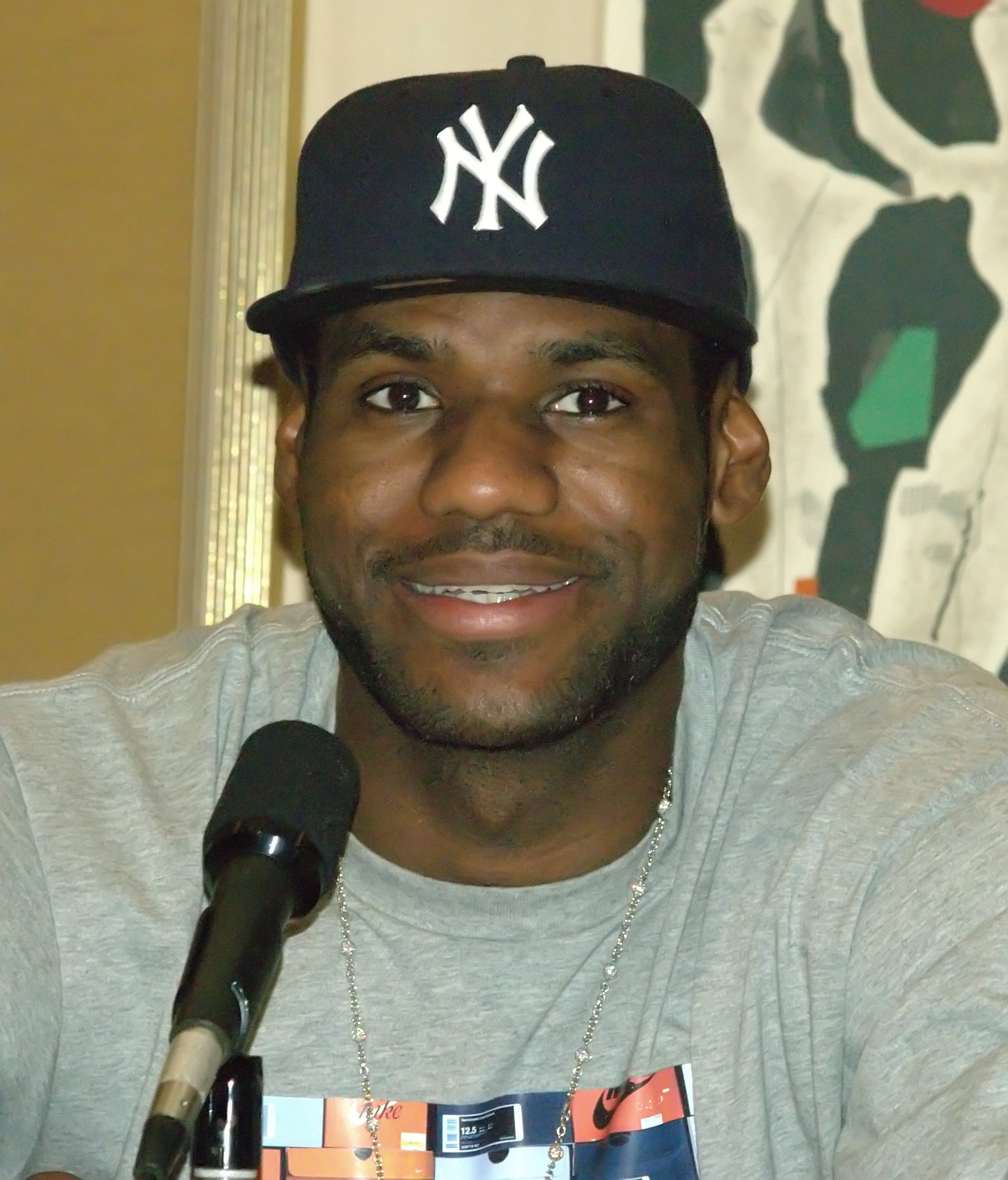
LeBron James wearing a New York Yankees cap in New York City, 2009

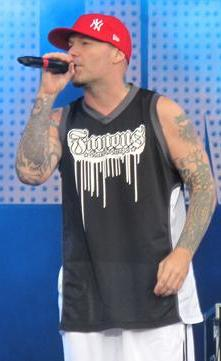
Fred Durst of Limp Bizkit wearing a red New York Yankees cap during a 2011 performance

The various baseball cap designs featuring the New York Yankees logo are widely worn in the United States, including by individuals who are not necessarily fans of baseball. Celebrities such as 50 Cent, LeBron James, and Fred Durst have, at various points in their careers, incorporated Yankees caps into their personal style. Filmmaker Spike Lee is also widely credited with influencing the cap’s crossover into fashion, having popularized non-traditional colorways—most notably a red Yankees cap—which helped expand its appeal beyond sports and into hip-hop and streetwear culture, later embraced by artists such as Jay-Z and Rakim.

Merchandise featuring the Yankees logo is also popular worldwide, particularly in regions where baseball itself has limited following. According to a 2023 report by The New York Times, Yankees caps—many of them counterfeit—have become "viral" in Brazil. Many consumers there are unaware that the logo represents a baseball team, instead viewing it as "a classic piece of Americana, a status symbol, or a generic—perhaps chic—emblem of the West".
