= Evan G. Greenberg =

American business executive (born 1955)

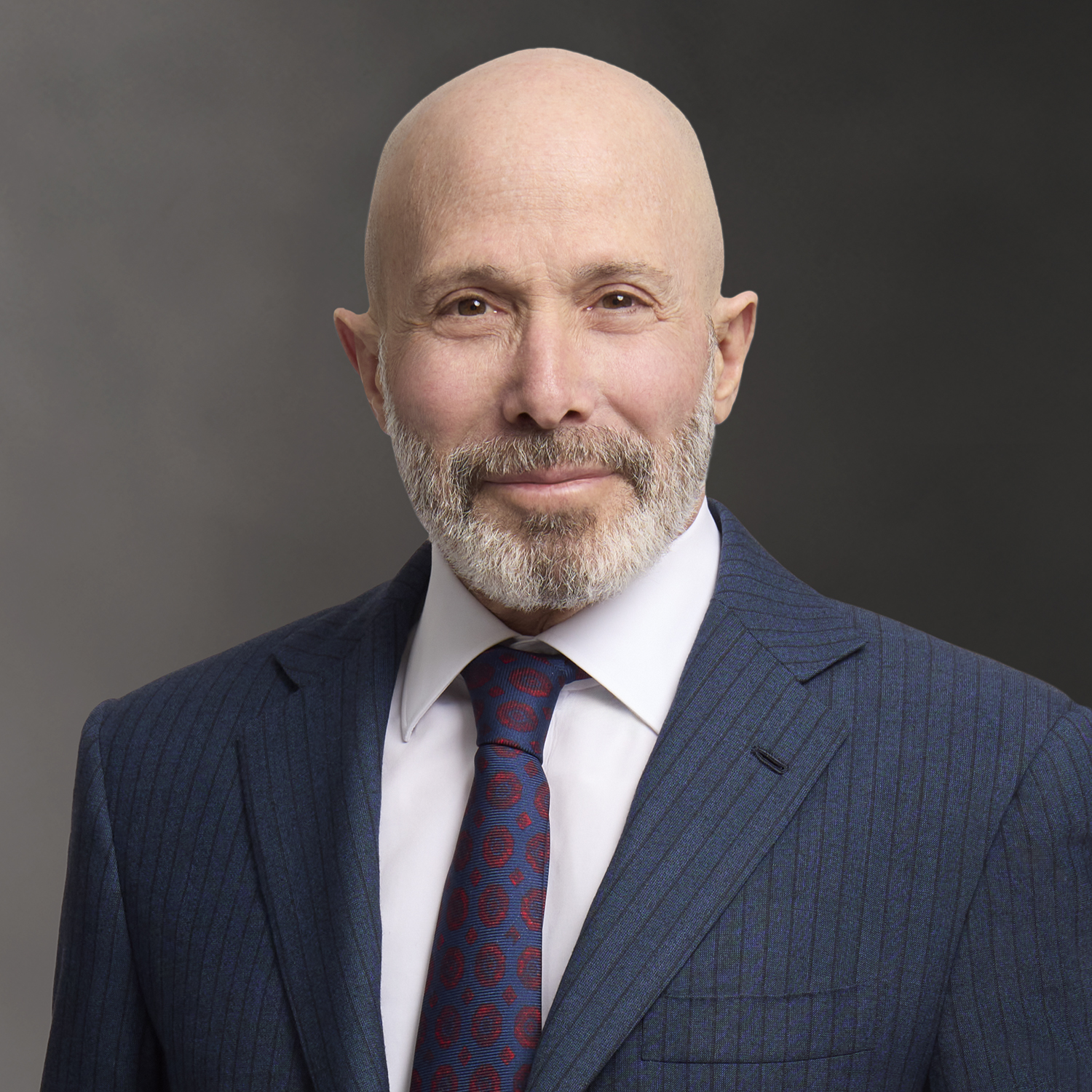
- Evan Greenberg, 2024
- Born: January 1955 (age 71)
- Education: New York University, College of Insurance (did not graduate from either)
- Occupations: Chairman and CEO of Chubb Limited
- Spouse: Mariana Campero
- Father: Maurice R. Greenberg
- Relatives: Jeffrey W. Greenberg (brother)

Evan G. Greenberg (born January 1955) is an American business executive. He is the chairman and CEO of the Zürich-based insurance company Chubb Limited (formerly ACE Limited).

== Early life and education ==
Greenberg is the son of Corinne Phyllis Zuckerman and Maurice R. Greenberg, the former chairman and CEO of American International Group (AIG). He is also the younger brother of Jeffrey W. Greenberg, the former CEO of Marsh & McLennan.

After graduating high school at 17, Greenberg traveled the country working odd jobs, including cooking at a nursing home and bartending. He later attended New York University and the College of Insurance but did not graduate from either.

== Career ==
=== Early career and AIG ===
In 1975, Greenberg started working in insurance, initially working for New Hampshire Insurance Co. in its automobile policies department. He began working for AIG later that year as an underwriter. During the 25 years he worked for AIG, Greenberg held a number of senior management positions. He ran AIG's Japan and Korea operations from 1991 to 1994. He then oversaw all international property-casualty operations from AIG's New York offices. Greenberg was named president and COO in 1997 and was considered the heir apparent to take over as CEO of AIG.

Despite Greenberg being in line to take over the company, he left his position as president in September 2000. He spent a year away from work to spend time with his family. After seeing the impact of the September 11 attacks on the insurance industry, with insurers affected by large claims, Greenberg decided to take the opportunity to accept then-ACE CEO Brian Duperreault's offer to join ACE.

=== ACE/Chubb ===
Greenberg joined ACE in November 2001 to lead the company's overseas unit. In June 2003, he was promoted to president and chief operating officer, and in May 2004, was named CEO. In May 2007, he was elected Chairman of ACE.

Following his promotion to CEO, Greenberg grew the company both through expansion of existing operations and through a strategy of acquisitions, acquiring 15 companies by 2015. In July 2015, Greenberg led a deal for ACE to acquire the insurance company Chubb for $28.3 billion, which was the largest merger deal in property and casualty insurance history. Shortly prior to the deal, he broke his ankle in a horse riding accident, and he worked on the merger while recovering. When the deal became official in January 2016, ACE adopted the Chubb name globally and Greenberg became chairman and CEO of Chubb. By 2021, Greenberg was credited in the media for having grown Chubb to the second-largest publicly listed insurance company in the U.S. and the largest non-injury insurer in the U.S. based on market value. As part of the acquisition plan to continue growing Chubb, he led an attempted acquisition bid for The Hartford in 2021. After making three offers that were each declined, he stated that Chubb would not continue to pursue the acquisition.

Following the merger, Greenberg has sought to grow Chubb's presence in Asia. He led the company's push to increase its holdings in Huatai Insurance, a China-based insurance company, by pursuing a regulatory change in China that would allow Chubb to become Huatai's majority owner. Officials passed the change in 2019 and Chubb gained majority ownership of Huatai in 2022.

In 2021, he led the company's acquisition of Cigna Group's Asian businesses that focused on health and accident insurance.

In 2023, Greenberg's total compensation from Chubb was $27.7 million, representing a CEO-to-median worker pay ratio of 452-to-1. In 2024, Greenberg's compensation rose to $30.1 million. In June 2026, Barron's named Greenberg one of its Top 25 CEOs of 2026. In a profile by financial journalist Andrew Bary, the publication described Chubb under Greenberg's leadership as a property and casualty insurance "masterpiece," noting that since the 2015 ACE–Chubb merger, the company had "consistently beaten its peers in profitability as measured by underwriting performance."

=== Political and financial positions, board roles ===
In the 2008 financial crisis, Greenberg opposed taxpayer-funded bailouts for the insurance industry. He gave a statement on behalf of the American Insurance Association as its then-chairman, noting that most of the association's members were not in favor of including property and casualty insurers in the list of companies able to make use of available federal bailout funds.

In February 2011, Greenberg was named to the board of directors at The Coca-Cola Company. He stepped down from the board position to focus on his role at Chubb in January 2016.

Greenberg has criticized protectionist trade policies and spoken in favor of policies that promote global trade and U.S. interests, such as the North American Free Trade Agreement.

During the COVID-19 pandemic, Greenberg called for a public-private partnership for pandemic risk, saying such a program would lessen the financial blow of a future pandemic. He testified at a July 2021 hearing of the U.S. Senate Committee on Banking, Housing and Urban Affairs, to advocate for such a program.

He has also advocated for better business and political relationships between the U.S. and China. He is a member and former chairman of the US-China Business Council.

In March 2024, Greenberg defended Chubb's decision to provide then-former President Donald Trump a $91.6 million appeal bond for the civil case E. Jean Carroll v. Donald J. Trump in a letter to Chubb investors claiming the company doesn't "take sides." Greenberg was appointed by Trump to the Advisory Committee for Trade Policy and Negotiations in 2018, serving on the committee from then into the Joe Biden presidency, stepping down in March 2023.

Greenberg is executive vice chair of the National Committee on United States-China Relations' board of directors and a member of the US-China Business Council's board of directors.
