= Players Weekend =

Major League Baseball promotion

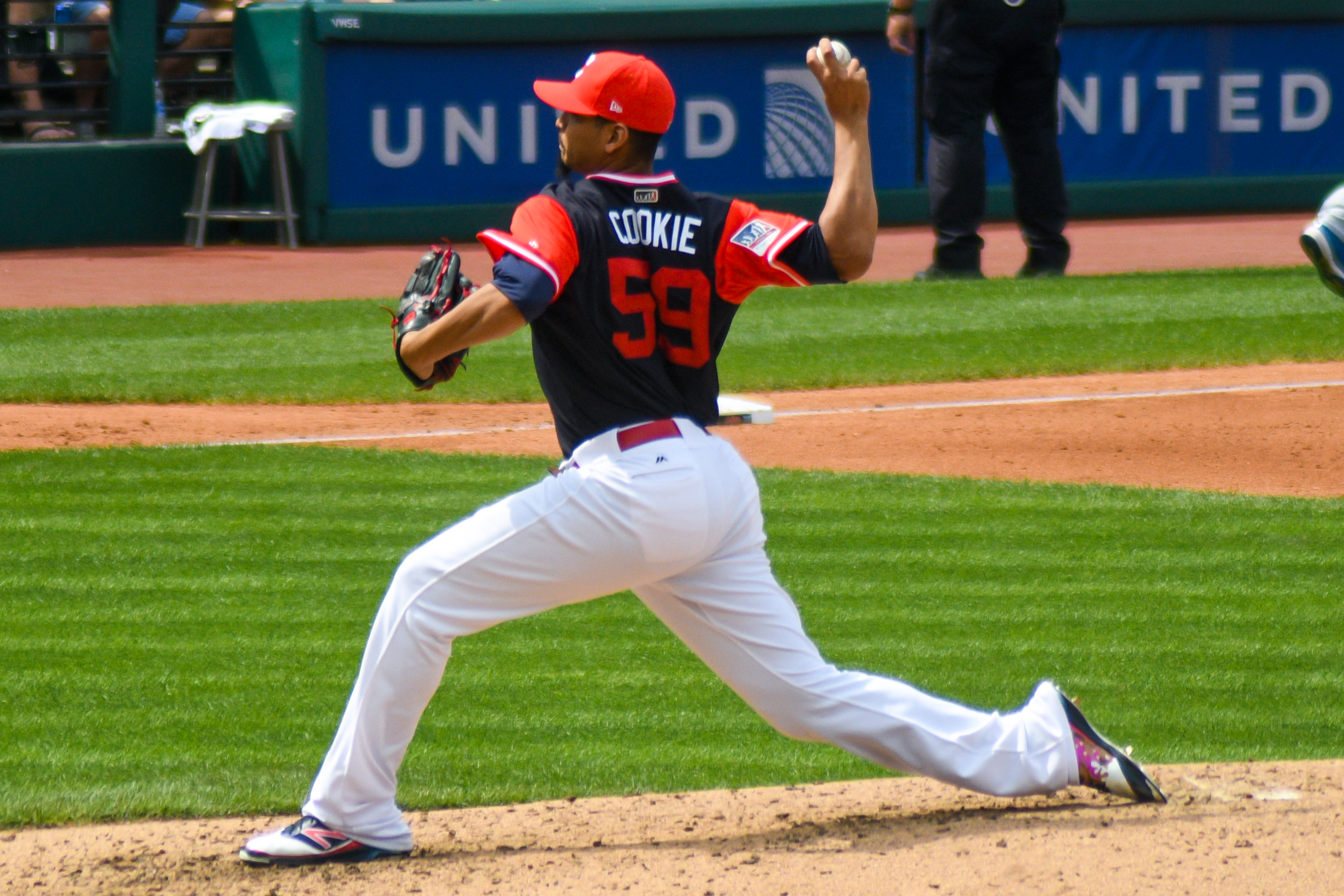
- Cleveland Indians pitcher Carlos Carrasco during Players Weekend in 2017
- Frequency: Annual
- Venue: Major-league ballparks, Bowman Field
- Founder: Major League Baseball, Major League Baseball Players Association
- Previous event: August 21–23, 2026
- Participants: All 30 major-league teams
- Website: www.mlb.com/events/players-weekend

Players Weekend is an annual Major League Baseball (MLB) event held since 2024, and previously from 2017 to 2019, in which players on all 30 MLB teams wear some atypical baseball uniform elements during regular-season games. The 2017–2019 editions of the event featured special uniforms with nicknames. The league also relaxes the rules for other equipment, such as cleats, batting gloves, wristbands, compression sleeves, catcher's masks, and bats, allowing players to use custom-designed gear. With the COVID-shortened 2020 season and a change that season in uniform suppliers from Majestic to Nike, the event was on hiatus from 2020 through 2023. The event returned in 2024, with players wearing special baseball caps.

The multi-day event was originally intended to give players the opportunity to express their personal style, appeal to the youth demographic, and acquaint hometown fans with newer team members. The 2024 edition focused on players assisting their favorite charities and connecting with fans.

== Origin ==
Major League Baseball (MLB) and the Major League Baseball Players Association (MLBPA) announced the venture on August 10, 2017. According to the MLBPA website, CC Sabathia of the New York Yankees, Bo Schultz of the Toronto Blue Jays, and Josh Thole of the Arizona Diamondbacks were "instrumental in developing the concept" together with representatives from the MLBPA and MLB. The event was designed to give players the opportunity to express their personal style, and to acquaint hometown fans with newer team members. The introduction of colorful baseball uniforms and nicknames also reached out to the youth demographic.

== 2017–2019 ==
The first three editions of Players Weekend took place on August 25–27, 2017; August 24–26, 2018; and August 23–25, 2019. The special uniforms designed for Players Weekend were also worn during the MLB Little League Classic each of those seasons, with the Classic being held the Sunday prior to the start of Players Weekend—an exception was made in 2019, when teams participating in the Classic wore colorful uniforms rather than that season's monochromatic uniforms of Players Weekend.

=== Logo and uniforms ===
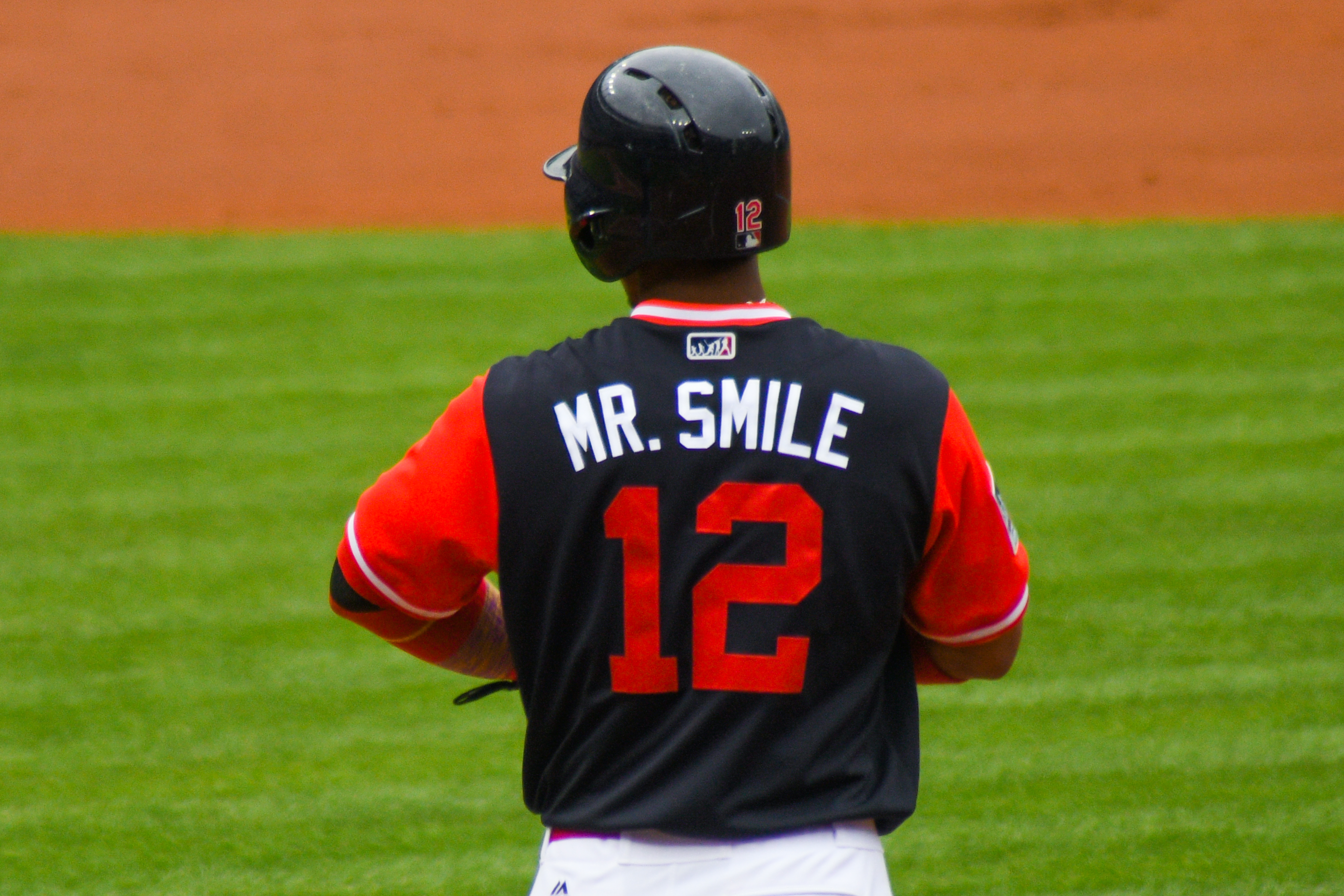
The "always smiling" Francisco Lindor of the Cleveland Indians chose the nickname "Mr. Smile" in 2017.

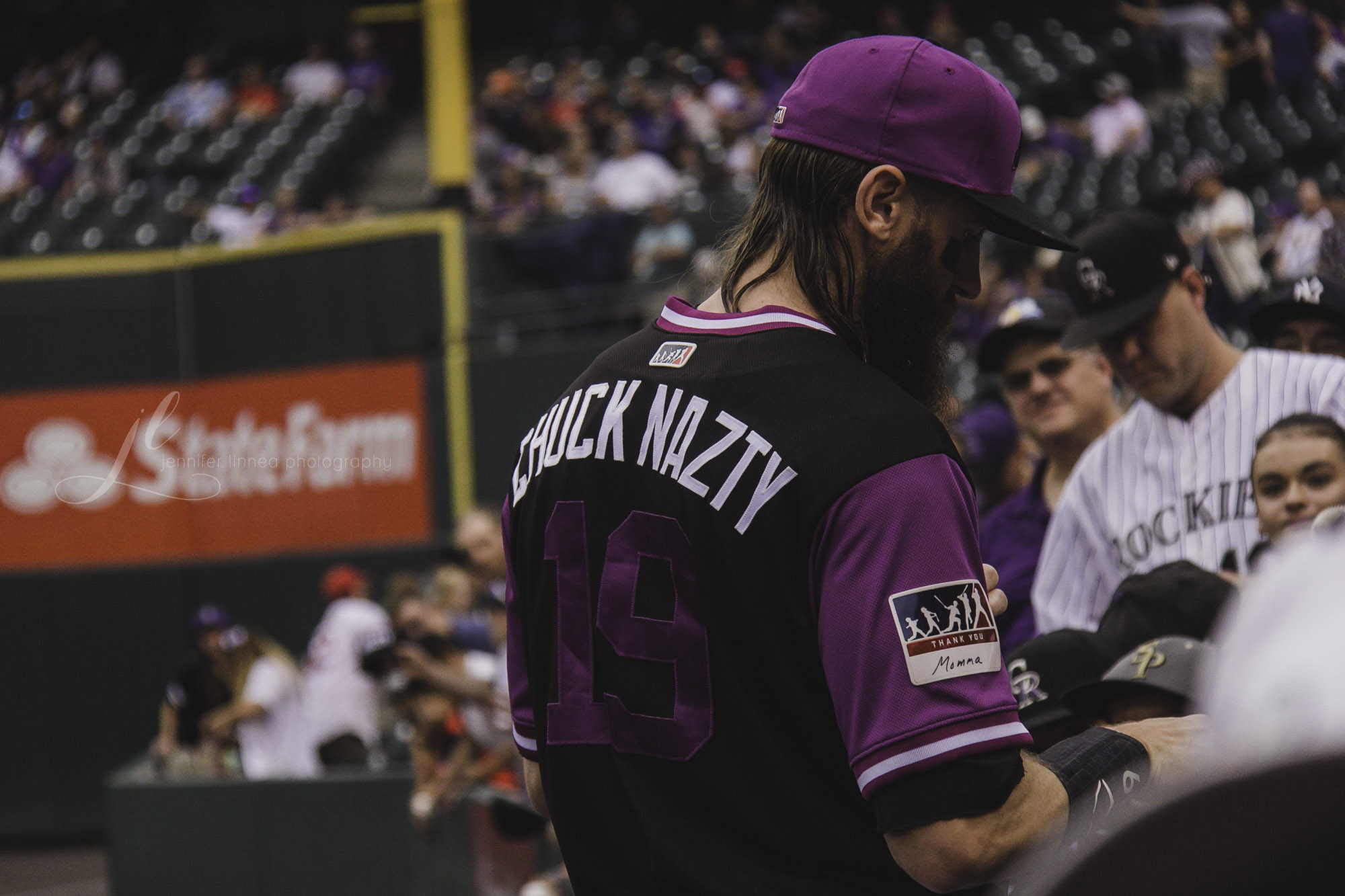
Charlie Blackmon of the Colorado Rockies identified as "Chuck Nazty" at the 2018 event.

In 2017, the usual MLB logo on the baseball caps and uniforms was replaced by a new logo depicting the evolution of a ball player from Little League Baseball to the major leagues. In 2017 and 2018, each team wore a pullover jersey (similar to what many teams wore in the 1970s and 1980s), as opposed to the traditional button-down jersey, with contrasting sleeve colors. The team uniforms, which took their color cues from youth sportswear, were designed by Majestic Athletic. The jerseys had a "tribute patch" on the right sleeve where each player could write under the words "Thank You" the names of those who had the most influence on his life and career. "Mom" and "Dad" were the most popular picks; players also saluted other family members and religious figures.

The player's surname (or, in the case of Ichiro Suzuki, his given name) usually printed on the back of the jersey was replaced with a nickname of the player's choosing. Players were encouraged, but not required, to choose a nickname. All uniforms, whether or not the players chose to use nicknames, had names on the back—including those of the New York Yankees, a team that had never before placed names on the back of any official jersey.

The choice of nicknames ranged from shortened monikers and initials to rhymes, puns, and descriptive epithets. Players were also allowed to wear T-shirts sporting the name and logo of the charity of their choice during batting practice, pregame workouts, and post-game interviews. Game-used jerseys were sold after the event, with proceeds benefiting the MLB-MLBPA Youth Development Foundation.

In the 2017 event, St. Louis Cardinals pitcher Seung-hwan Oh imprinted his name in Korean characters (오승환). A few players were not able to use their preferred nickname due to potential copyright or trademark infringement, such as "Superman" (Kevin Pillar), "Kojak" (Adrián Beltré), "Led Zeflin" (Zach Eflin), and "Hoby Wan Kenobi" (Hoby Milner). Chicago Cubs pitcher Carl Edwards Jr. was the only player allowed to use a brand name, Carl's Jr., on the back of his jersey; Edwards Jr. also imprinted the restaurant chain's logo on one of his cleats.

In 2018, Brad Boxberger had his surname on the back of his jersey, but in the form of emojis ("📦🍔") instead of letters.

For the 2019 event, Walker Lockett had his surname in the form of an emoji as a simple lock ("🔒"). Russell Martin, whose nickname is "The Muscle", chose "El 💪🏻". Cleveland Indians players Carlos Carrasco ("cookie🍪"), Mike Clevinger ("peace sign☮, sunshine☀️") and Francisco Lindor were among those who chose to wear emojis on their jerseys, though Lindor sandwiched "Mr. Smile" between two smiley faces. Los Angeles Dodgers pitcher Hyun-Jin Ryu chose his nickname in Korean writing ("류현진"). In 2019, several players opted to use their nickname to honor Tyler Skaggs, who died earlier in the season, while all players wore a "45" patch in his honor.

=== Other gear ===
The New Era Cap Company supplies caps. In 2017, socks in multicolored hues were the same for all 30 teams; players had the option of rolling up the cuffs of their pants to show off the design. The socks are supplied by Stance.

Players are allowed to wear brightly colored and custom-designed cleats, batting gloves, wristbands, compression sleeves, and catcher's masks that are typically not permitted under MLB rules. The league did prohibit the use of white as a color for the batting gloves, wristbands, and compression sleeves, since it might interfere with umpires' ability to judge a play. Players can also custom-design their bats. Sam Bat, a bat supplier to the league, produced dozens of custom-ordered bats for the 2017 event that were painted with different colors, images, and country flags.

After the 2017 event, Curtis Granderson raffled off his three pairs of customized cleats online; anyone who donated at least $50 to his charity, Grand Kids Foundation, during the weekend was eligible to win.

For the 2019 event, the league allowed players to use mobile devices and tablets in dugouts and on the field before the game.

=== 2019 monochromatic uniforms ===
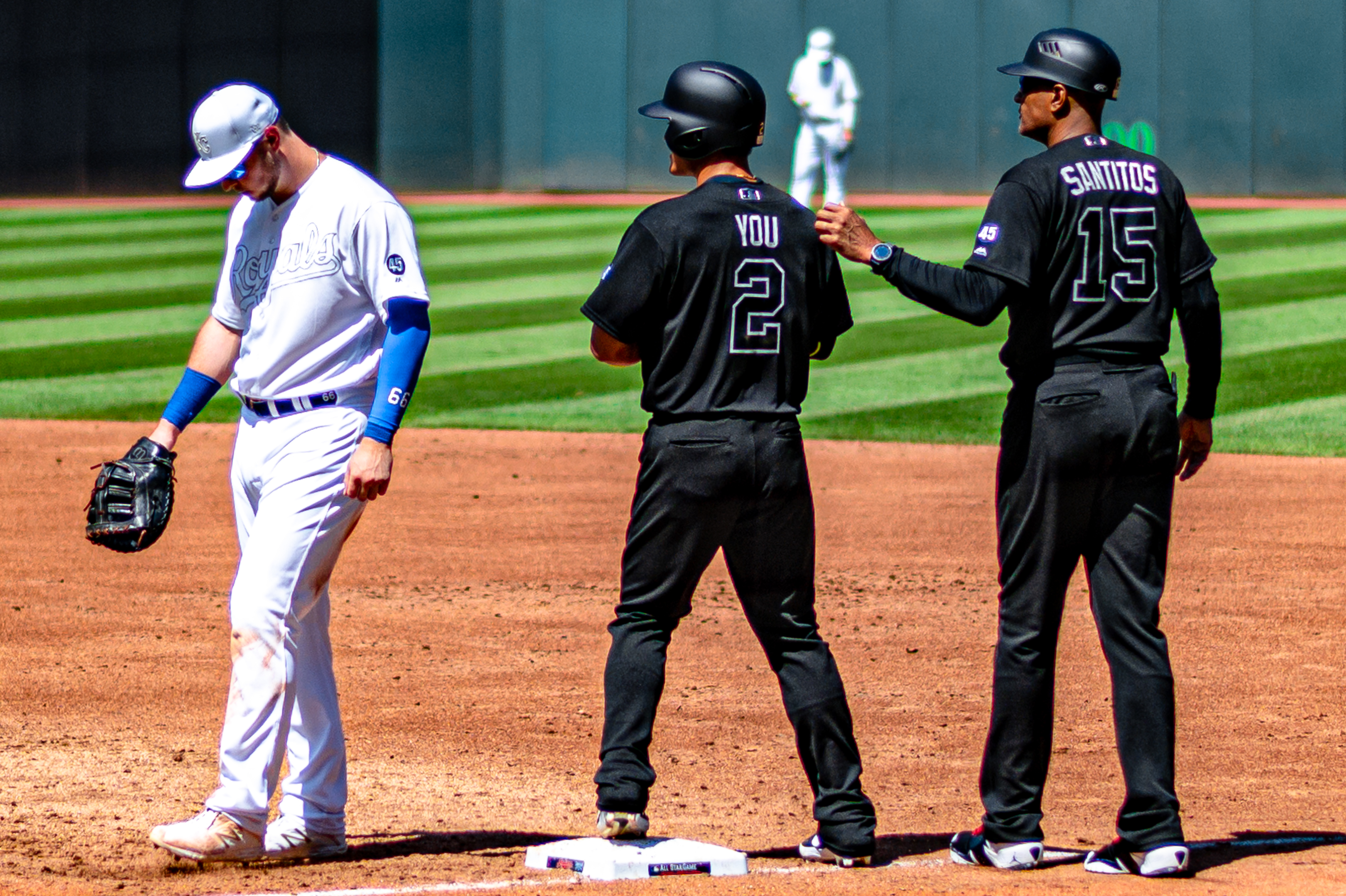
Ryan O'Hearn of the Kansas City Royals (left) wears the all-white uniform and Yu Chang and Sandy Alomar Jr. of the Cleveland Indians wear the all-black uniforms at Progressive Field during Players Weekend in 2019.

For 2019, MLB mandated that all uniforms and caps be either all-white or all-black, with the home team getting the first choice of color and the visiting team wearing the other color option. Batting helmets would be either matte-black or matte-white, depending on the color the team has chosen. The one exception to the monochromatic uniform look was the pitcher on the "white" team, who wore a black cap with his white jersey and pants in order not to obstruct hitters from seeing the ball. Nicknames were sewn onto the back of both white and black jerseys in silver. The monochromatic apparel was intended to make logos and accessories, which players were allowed to customize, stand out more.

== 2024 ==
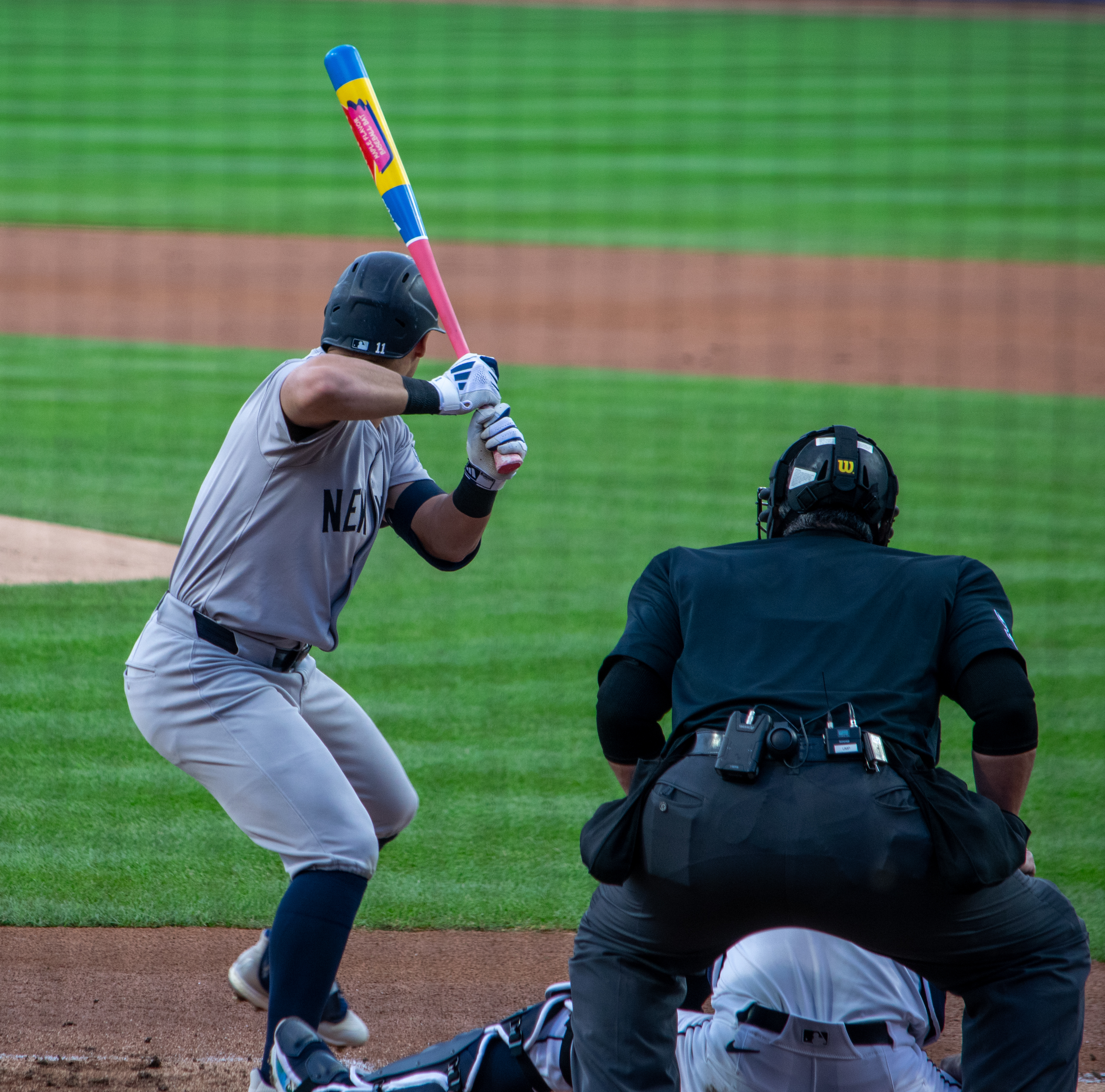
Anthony Volpe (left) of the New York Yankees using a Dubble Bubble-inspired custom bat during the 2024 MLB Little League Classic

Players Weekend returned after a five-year hiatus, being held August 16–18, 2024. Unlike previous editions, it did not feature special uniforms with nicknames, but did feature special caps, and players were again allowed to use some custom-designed equipment such as colorful cleats, bats, and gloves. The "reimagined" event was purposed differently than earlier editions; it was described as "a platform to celebrate MLB players’ interests, backstories, and the charitable causes that are important to them." Each day of the event had a specific theme: Fun Friday, Charitable Saturday, and Appreciation Sunday. The 2024 edition also coincided with the seventh edition of the MLB Little League Classic, held at Bowman Field in Williamsport, Pennsylvania.

== Reactions ==
Players Weekend was initially hailed by MLB players as a long-overdue opportunity to express their personal style on the field.

According to SB Nation, 58 players across the league declined to choose a nickname in 2017, instead using their first or last name on their jerseys. New York Yankees outfielder Brett Gardner, whose team had never had a name on the back of the jersey, wanted no name at all, but he was overruled; he ended up printing his surname. While most players enjoyed custom designing their cleats and other gear, Arizona Diamondbacks pitcher Andrew Chafin opted to wear his regular black cleats.

Reaction to the 2019 monochrome uniforms by fans, sportswriters, and even team personnel was overwhelmingly negative. Fans on social media posts compared them to trash bags, chess pieces and even the Spy vs. Spy cartoon from Mad magazine. A USA Today reporter wrote: "If you're checking out highlights from across the league, every game looks the same". Cleveland Indians manager Terry Francona jokingly said that he didn't plan to make mound visits during Players Weekend so no one would see him wearing the uniform; he added: "What's the slogan, 'Let the kids play?' Let the grown-ups look like morons". Los Angeles Dodgers manager Dave Roberts compared the jerseys to "an ugly Christmas sweater". The Chicago Cubs let MLB know their dissatisfaction with the uniforms by wearing their traditional royal blue caps on the first day of Players Weekend. However, MLB let the Cubs know they did not approve of this decision, and the team wore the designated white caps the rest of the weekend.

The 2024 edition received media attention for many players' use of bats and cleats with custom designs.
