= Robert B. Willumstad =

Robert B. "Bob" Willumstad is a former chairman and CEO of the American International Group (AIG).

He was born on August 22, 1945, in Brooklyn and grew up in Elmont on Long Island. His alma mater is Adelphi University. He and his wife Carol reside in New York City, and have two adult daughters and three grandchildren.

Under Sanford I. Weill, Willumstad helped to steer the 1998 merger of Travelers Group and Citicorp. From 2000 to 2003, he was the chairman and CEO of Citigroup's Global Consumer Group. He was named President of Citigroup in 2002, and assumed the post of Chief Operating Officer in 2003, while continuing to serve as CEO and President of Citibank North America. Some suggested that he had been passed over for CEO in favour of Charles Prince, despite being in charge of Citi's largest business.

Willumstad left Citigroup in July 2005, saying that he wanted to run a major company, after CEO Charles Prince decided to take back control of operations.

Willumstad founded Brysam Global Partners, a specialized private equity firm that invests in financial services, in 2007 with partner Marjorie Magner.

Willumstad served as the chairman of the board of directors of AIG from 2006 until 2008, after Maurice R. Greenberg was forced to resign.

Willumstad became CEO on June 15, 2008, after Martin J. Sullivan was ousted. One of Willumstad's initiatives was to repair the rift with Greenberg. In September 2008, Edward M. Liddy succeeded Willumstad to oversee the company's government-financed asset sale. Willumstad refused a $22 million severance payment for his three months' work at AIG since he was never able to enact his strategy. AIG's stock price declined 97% during his short tenure due to preexisting company conditions.

On October 7, 2008, Willumstad testified before the United States House Committee on Oversight and Government Reform on Capitol Hill regarding the causes and effects of the bailout of AIG.

Business positions
Preceded by Maurice R. Greenberg	Chairman of AIG; 2006-08	Succeeded by Edward M. Liddy
Preceded by Martin J. Sullivan	CEO of AIG; 2008	Succeeded by Edward M. Liddy
