= Martin J. Sullivan =

American businessman

- Born: 1955 (age 70–71); Hill Cottage, England

Martin J. Sullivan, OBE, (born 1955 in Essex, England), is the former deputy chairman of Willis Group Holdings plc (NYSE: WSH) and chairman and CEO of its, Willis Global Solutions, which oversees brokerage and risk management advisory services for Willis's multinational and global accounts. He also previously served as president and chief executive officer of American International Group, Inc.

== Work at AIG ==
In 1971 Sullivan joined AIU's finance department, the non-life UK company of AIG. In 1974, he joined the property department and held a succession of underwriting and management assignments in the UK and Ireland. In 1983, Sullivan was appointed property manager for the UK and later regional property manager for the UK/Ireland. In 1988 Sullivan became UK/Ireland marketing manager of AIU. Sullivan was appointed assistant managing director of AIG Europe (UK) Ltd. in 1989 and chief operating officer in 1991. In 1993 he was named president of AIU's UK/Ireland Division and managing director of AIG Europe (UK) Ltd. Sullivan became senior vice president, foreign general insurance in 1996, and executive vice president, foreign general in 1998.

In 1996 he was appointed chief operating officer of AIU in New York City and named president in 1997. He was elected to the board of AIG in May 2002 and was groomed as a potential CEO. Sullivan succeeded Maurice R. Greenberg, who stepped down as AIG's CEO amidst an accounting scandal. His career and accomplishments at AIG prior to his appointment as CEO were viewed positively. Frank Zarb, chairman of the executive committee at the time of Sullivan's CEO appointment, said, "AIG has a very strong and deep management team, and Martin Sullivan is a proven leader who will be an outstanding CEO. Martin has a distinguished record of accomplishment at AIG. He has achieved significant results in several key positions, and he has a deep understanding of AIG's major businesses throughout its domestic and international operations."

Soon after his appointment as CEO on March 14, 2005, Sullivan began work on settling certain of AIG's regulatory issues that he inherited from Greenberg. This led to a settlement with then New York Attorney General Eliot Spitzer that was announced on February 9, 2006, and was viewed as an important first cleanup step for AIG. Sullivan also successfully helped lead AIG through a required financial statement as a result of these various regulatory and accounting issues. Sullivan was replaced as CEO by Robert B. Willumstad on June 15, 2008.

On October 7, 2008, Sullivan testified before the United States House Committee on Oversight and Government Reform on Capitol Hill regarding the causes and effects of the bailout of AIG.

== Controversy Over pay ==
Sullivan's severance package payments were withheld by AIG after the then Attorney General of New York, Andrew Cuomo, raised issues. According to USA Today, "AIG CEO Martin Sullivan received $25.4 million in non severance related compensation between 2005 and 2007, including $322,000 for private use of corporate aircraft, $153,000 for car and parking, $160,000 for home security and $41,000 for financial planning."

AIG is currently undergoing investigation by the New York State attorney general's office for what State Attorney General Andrew Cuomo called "unwarranted and outrageous" executive expenditures in the wake of the U.S. government's initial $85 billion support package extended to the failing bank. Mr. Cuomo criticized in particular the multimillion-dollar payments to Martin Sullivan, AIG's former chief executive, and Joseph J. Cassano, who ran the unit blamed for the losses that pushed the company to the brink of collapse. AIG agreed to help recover that money.

== Philanthropy, awards, and associations ==
He is reported to have donated, in January 2007, £50,000 to the Sydney Russell School in Dagenham, Essex. He was quoted as saying: "I would not be where I am today if it were not for the education and high standards I received there." Sullivan attended a predecessor school that was amalgamated c. 1990 to form the Sydney Russell School.

Sullivan is an associate member of the Chartered Insurance Institute, a Fellow of the Institute of Leadership & Management, a Member of the Chartered Management Institute, a director of the International Insurance Society and former chairman of The Geneva Association. He also serves on the Business Advisory Committees of the St. George's Society and The British Memorial Garden Trust, on the board of directors for Episcopal Charities of New York, and on the board of trustees of the American Associates of the Royal Academy Trust. He is a past president of British American Business Inc. and is a director of Young Audiences Inc. and Friends of London Youth Inc.

He was awarded The American Ireland Fund Leadership Award in May 2007. Sullivan is the recipient of The International Center in New York's Award of Excellence and was made an Officer of the Order of the British Empire in the 2007 Birthday Honours for "services to British business interests".

Business positions
Preceded by Maurice R. Greenberg	CEO of AIG; 2005–2008	Succeeded by Robert B. Willumstad
