= Deadline Hollywood =

Online entertainment news magazine

- Screenshot of the website in December 2024
- Website type: Film and entertainment news
- Headquarters: United States
- Owner: Penske Media Corporation
- Founder: Nikki Finke
- Editors: Nellie Andreeva; Mike Fleming Jr.; Justin Kroll; Anthony D'Alessandro
- Website: deadline.com
- Launched: September 4, 2009; 17 years ago

Deadline Hollywood, commonly known as Deadline and also referred to as Deadline.com, is an online news site founded as the news blog Deadline Hollywood Daily by Nikki Finke in 2006. The site is focused on Hollywood and new trends in the entertainment industry. It has been a brand of Penske Media Corporation since 2009.

== History ==
Deadline was founded by Nikki Finke, who began writing an LA Weekly column series called Deadline Hollywood in June 2002. She began the Deadline Hollywood Daily (DHD) blog in March 2006 as an online version of her column. She officially launched it as an entertainment trade website in 2006. The site became one of Hollywood's most followed websites by 2009. In 2009, Finke sold Deadline to Penske Media Corporation (then Mail.com Media) for a low-seven-figure sum. She was also given a five-year-plus employment contract reported by the Los Angeles Times as "millions of dollars", as well as part of the site's revenue. In September 2009, the URL was changed to deadline.com and the site's name became Deadline Hollywood.

The publication expanded to New York in 2010 with the hiring of Variety reporter Mike Fleming Jr. as its New York editor, Financial Times editor Tim Adler to lead Deadline London, and Nellie Andreeva for the site's television coverage as "co-editors-in-chief, TV". Finke remained the editor of Deadline Hollywood until November 2013, when she left after a year-long disagreement between herself and Penske, which had bought Variety, a competing trade magazine and website.
