= Nikki Finke =

American journalist (1953–2022)

- The photo on her AP press pass in 1979
- Born: Nikki Jean Finke; December 16, 1953; New York City, U.S.
- Died: October 9, 2022 (aged 68); Boca Raton, Florida, U.S.
- Education: Wellesley College
- Occupations: Writer, journalist, blogger, publisher
- Spouse: Jeffrey W. Greenberg (m. 1980; div. 1982)

Nikki Jean Finke (December 16, 1953 – October 9, 2022) was an American blogger, journalist, publisher and writer. She also was the founder, editor-in-chief and president of Deadline Hollywood, a website with original content consisting of reporting and commentary on the business of the entertainment industry by her and other show business journalists. She founded and was the chief executive officer of Hollywood Dementia LLC and its website, HollywoodDementia.com, for showbiz short fiction.

== Early life ==
Finke was born at Doctors Hospital in Manhattan, New York City, on December 16, 1953, the younger of two daughters born to Jewish parents, Robert and Doris Finke. She was raised in the affluent village of Sands Point, New York, on Long Island.

Finke was educated at Buckley Country Day School and the Hewitt School, before attending Wellesley College, where she studied political science and was the editor-in-chief of the college newspaper.

== Career ==
Finke's first job after Wellesley was in New York congressman Ed Koch's Washington, D.C. office. She decided to become a reporter after seeing how Koch and his staff would show deference to reporters.

In 1975, Finke joined the Associated Press (AP) and covered Koch's successful 1977 New York City mayoral campaign. She then worked on the AP's foreign desk at the New York City headquarters, Baltimore, Boston, Moscow and London. Finke later worked for The Dallas Morning News. She joined the staff of Newsweek as a correspondent in Washington and Los Angeles, then at the Los Angeles Times as a staff writer, covering entertainment and features. Finke became the West Coast Editor for The New York Observer, and then New York, where she penned Hollywood business columns. She also wrote for The New York Times, Vanity Fair, Esquire, Harper's Bazaar, Elle, The Washington Post, Salon, Premiere and Los Angeles.

Finke joined the New York Post in 2001, but was fired in early 2002, after she reported that The Walt Disney Company was destroying documents related to a licensing dispute. She then sued Disney and the Post for $10 million, alleging the companies had colluded to suppress coverage of the story; she received an out-of-court settlement. Afterward, LA Weekly hired her and began running her column "Deadline Hollywood". In 2006, she began the Deadline (Deadline Hollywood Daily until September 2009) blog as a daily online version of her weekly column. She described it as her "forum to break news about the infotainment industry."

The New York Times described Finke as "a digital-age Walter Winchell" with an "in your face" writing style, who is "feared by [Hollywood] executives". Deadline became a key information portal during the 2007 Writers Guild of America strike, tripling her readership; according to the Times: "Finke's Web site has become a critical forum for Hollywood...But it [is the] strike that may have finally solidified her position as a Hollywood power broker". Finke claimed to have worked "almost around the clock" during the strike; in 2009, the Los Angeles Times noted her announcement of a five-day vacation.

In 2008, Finke was named on Elle's 25 most influential women in Hollywood list, and to the Heeb 100. In 2009, she sold Deadline to Jay Penske's Mail.com Media Corp, reportedly for $14 million, under an agreement by which she would continue as the editor-in-chief and President of the website which would feature her reporting and commentary.

On November 5, 2013, Deadline Hollywood announced Nikki Finke's departure. On June 12, 2014, she launched NikkiFinke.com. On August 3, 2015, she launched HollywoodDementia.com as a site for showbiz short fiction written by her and other insiders. The New York Times said: "Ms. Finke finds herself facing a daunting new chapter in her career: a plan to leave journalism and write and publish fiction about the entertainment industry". Finke said "There's a lot of truth in fiction", and added "There are things I am going to be able to say in fiction that I can't say in journalism right now".

On May 11, 2016, Deadline printed Finke's remembrance of how she founded Deadline Hollywood on the occasion of the website's ten-year anniversary. "When I started Deadline Hollywood Daily, as it was called way back in 2006, I needed a quicker way to report breaking entertainment news than my weekly newspaper column. So I bought the URL DeadlineHollywoodDaily.com for 14 bucks and change. I didn't set out to be a disruptor. Or an internet journalist who created something out of nothing that put the Hollywood trades back on their heels, and today, under Penske Media ownership, is a website worth $100+ million. Or a woman with brass balls, attitude and ruthless hustle, who told hard truths about the moguls and who accurately reported scoops first."

== Reception ==
In 2006, Finke's LA Weekly columns won First Place in the Alternative Weekly Awards in the category of "Media Reporting/Criticism, Circulation >50,000". In 2007, Finke won the Los Angeles Press Club's Southern California Journalism Award for "Entertainment Journalist of the Year", with the judges commenting: "Reading Nikki Finke's salaciously candid coverage of Hollywood and its inhabitants almost feels like a guilty pleasure. She mixes the news with fearless finger-wagging that's just fun to read no matter the subject. She tackles the industry monoliths without the kiddy gloves and she seems to have command of the beat." In the 2007 AltWeekly Awards, Deadline won Second Place.

A studio executive said of Finke: "She's very, very, very, accurate, extraordinarily so—you have a supposedly private conversation with two other people, and it's on her site within an hour." Charlie Koones, former Variety publisher, called her a "once-in-a-generation talent".

However, others questioned Finke's "harsh tone", "summary executions", "penchant for innuendo and unnamed sources", and allegedly giving better coverage to "her favorites" and frequent sources, such as Ari Emanuel and Ronald Meyer. In 2008, she was criticized for first posting a Sony press release and then adding her own analysis which contradicted the release without updating the time stamp, and in early 2009, Finke was accused of retroactively altering a Deadline Hollywood Daily report about the director of the third Twilight film.

== Personal life and death ==
In 1974, Finke became engaged to Jeffrey W. Greenberg. They were married from 1980 until their divorce in 1982.

Finke's health declined in her later years, primarily from complications of diabetes. She died at a hospice facility in Boca Raton, Florida, on October 9, 2022, aged 68.

== See also ==
- Film criticism
- E-zines
