= Frank G. Zarb School of Business =

Business school of Hofstra University

Coordinates: 40.71403°N 73.59754°W

Hofstra University Zarb School of Business
- Type: Private university business school
- Affiliations: Hofstra University
- Dean: Janet A. Lenaghan
- Location: Long Island & New York City, New York, U.S.
- Website: business.hofstra.edu

The Frank G. Zarb School of Business, located at Hofstra University in Hempstead, New York, United States, is noted for its dual AACSB accreditations in business and accounting. The school is named after alumnus Frank Zarb, '57 B.B.A., '62 M.B.A., who was the chair and CEO of the National Association of Securities Dealers (NASD) and a senior partner of Lazard Freres & Co. The current dean of the business school is Dr. Janet A. Lenaghan.

== Degrees ==
The school offers Bachelor of Business Administration, Master of Business Administration, Master of Science degrees, the Executive Master of Business Administration (E.M.B.A.) degree, as well as minors in business subjects and certificate programs. In 2011, the school launched the first online MBA program on Long Island, NY. Hofstra also offers an MBA program with classes held in Manhattan.

== Facilities ==
During the summer, the School of Business offers Hofstra students the opportunity to study at Erasmus University in Rotterdam, The Netherlands, and at Hong-Ik University in Seoul, South Korea. The business school also has a chapter of Beta Gamma Sigma. One of the newest structures on Hofstra's campus, is the C.V. Starr Hall. It is named for philanthropist Cornelius Vander Starr.

== Centers and special institutes ==
Business students can also participate in scholarly activities like The Merrill Lynch Center. This center was enacted to promote and facilitate faculty and student study in the field of international financial services and markets.

== Student organizations ==
Student organizations include the Journal of International Business & Law, which is a joint scholarly publication of the Frank G. Zarb School of Business and the students of the Hofstra University School of Law. The Hofstra Business Consulting Group, which has grown to become a powerful source of strategic consulting for growing businesses in the New York metropolitan area and the Hofstra American Marketing Association. The Hofstra Marketing Association is a member of the American Marketing Association.
