= Starr Companies =

American insurance company

Starr
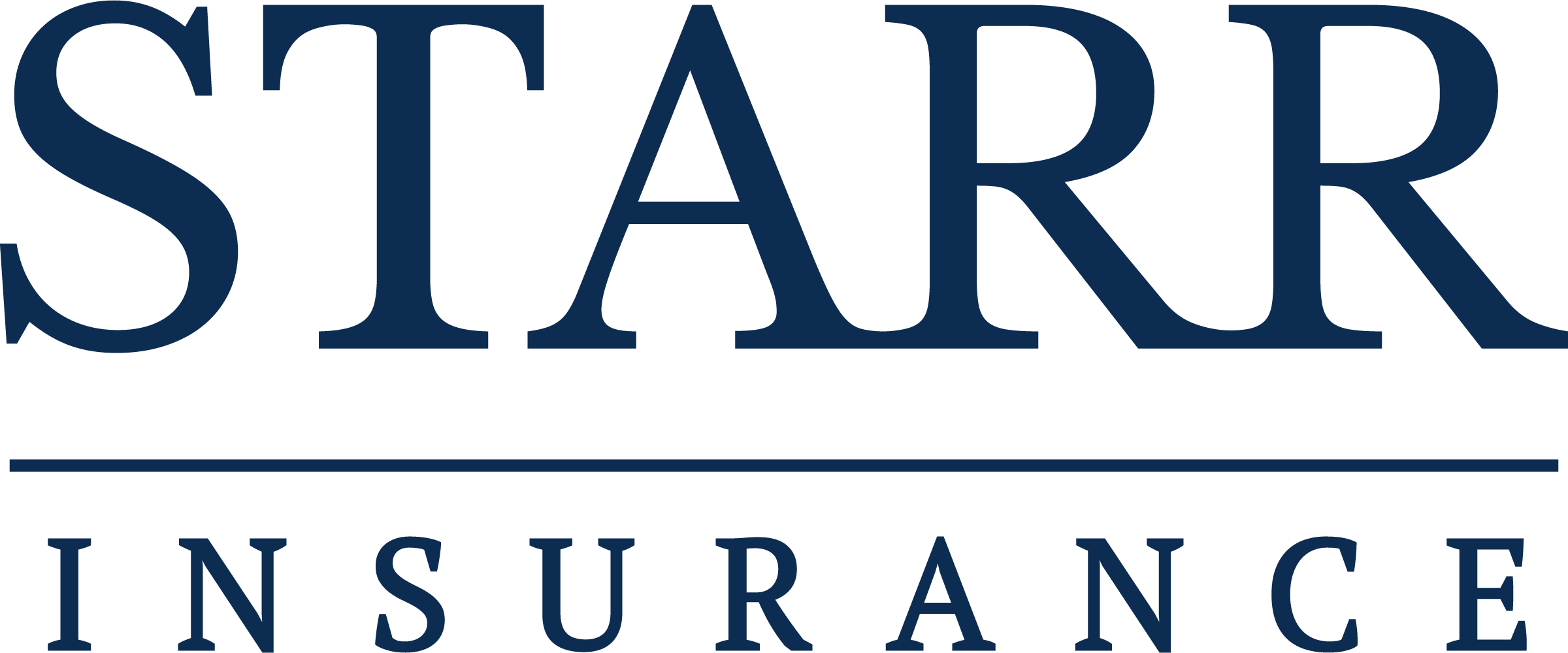
- Industry: Property & Casualty Insurance and Investment Management
- Founded: 1919
- Founder: Cornelius Vander Starr
- Headquarters: New York City
- Total assets: US$43.9 billion
- Total equity: US$14.9 billion
- Subsidiaries: STARR International Company, Inc. C.V. Starr & Co., Inc.; Starr Private Equity Partners, LLC; Starr Investment Holdings, LLC
- Website: starr.com

Starr is a marketing name for the operating insurance and travel assistance companies and subsidiaries of Starr International Company, Inc. and for the investment business of C. V. Starr & Co., Inc. and its subsidiaries. Starr is an insurance and investment organization with a presence on six continents; through its operating insurance companies, Starr provides property, casualty, and accident and health insurance products, as well as a range of specialty coverages, including aviation, marine, energy and excess casualty insurance. Starr's insurance company subsidiaries — domiciled in the U.S., Bermuda, China, Hong Kong, Singapore, U.K. and Malta — each have an A.M. Best rating of “A” (Excellent). Starr's Lloyd's syndicate has a S&P Global Ratings grade of “A+” (Strong).

Cornelius Vander Starr established his first insurance company in Shanghai, China in 1919. Today, Starr is capable of writing in 128 countries on six continents.

Maurice R. Greenberg was the chairman and chief executive officer of Starr until 2025 when his sons Jeffrey W. Greenberg and L. Scott Greenberg took over. In 2005, Mr. Greenberg retired as chairman and CEO of American International Group (AIG), a former Starr subsidiary, which became the first fully licensed foreign insurance company in China.

Starr owns Morefar Back O’Beyond, a private golf course located on 500 acres (2.0 km2) in both Danbury, Connecticut and Southeast, New York.

In 2023, Starr became the Signature Partner of the New York Yankees, an agreement allowing them exclusive rights to advertise on the player's jerseys. The agreement was implemented on July 21, 2023, with the contract being active until 2031 and this made the Yankees the 13th team to add advertisements to their jerseys.

In October 2025, Starr announced plans to acquire the IQUW group, which also included ERS. The acquisition was complete in March 2026.
