= Jeffrey W. Greenberg =

American lawyer

- Born: Jeffrey Wayne Greenberg; 1951 (age 74–75); United States
- Occupations: Lawyer, business executive
- Spouse: Nikki Finke (m. 1980; div. 1982)
- Father: Maurice R. Greenberg
- Relatives: Evan G. Greenberg (brother)

Jeffrey Wayne Greenberg (born 1951) is an American lawyer and business executive, who was chairman and CEO of Marsh & McLennan Companies from 1999 to 2004.

== Early life and education ==
Greenberg was born the son of Corinne Phyllis (née Zuckerman) and Maurice R. Greenberg, the former chairman and CEO of American International Group (AIG). He attended Choate Rosemary Hall in Connecticut. He earned a bachelor's degree from Brown University in 1973 and a JD degree from Georgetown University Law School in 1976.

== Career ==
He began his career at Marsh & McLennan after graduation. During the September 11 attacks, 295 staff members were killed. Greenberg was then in midtown Manhattan, at the company's headquarters, with "an unobstructed view of lower Manhattan" where he witnessed "smoke rising from One World Trade Center and the fireball erupt from the second tower." He then led the company's immediate response to the crisis.

Greenberg resigned as CEO of Marsh & McLennan after the firm was charged with conducting a lucrative kickback scheme by then New York State Attorney General Eliot Spitzer, who demanded management changes, stating that "The leadership of that company is not a leadership I will talk to and not a leadership I will negotiate with." In 2012, the Financial Times reported that "Mr. Greenberg was never charged with any wrongdoing, while Mr. Spitzer was later engulfed in a prostitute scandal."

Greenberg is chairman of the private equity firm he founded, Aquiline Holdings. He is a member of the Council on Foreign Relations, serves as a trustee of the Brookings Institution, and has served as a member of Brown University's corporation. He has sat on the board of trustees of New York-Presbyterian Hospital since 1998.

== Personal life ==
Greenberg had a 14-year relationship with journalist Nikki Finke, getting engaged in 1974 and married in 1980. The couple divorced in 1982. He later remarried and has four children.
