= College of Insurance =

American specialized college

Coordinates: 40.71616°N 74.01266°W

The School of Risk Management, Insurance and Actuarial Science
- Type: School within St. John's University
- Established: 1901
- Location: Manhattan, New York, U.S.
- Campus: 101 Murray Street
- Website: www.stjohns.edu

The College of Insurance (TCI) was a specialized accredited college, started by insurance industry leaders in 1901 as an insurance library society, the Insurance Society of New York (ISNY). It became a part of St. John's University in 2001.

== History ==
The Insurance Society of New York initially provided study space and material to young people entering the insurance industry, and served as a site for insurance lectures. Over the years, ISNY developed a curriculum based upon these lectures. The curriculum ultimately led to the creation of The School of Insurance, followed by The College of Insurance.

The College of Insurance offered bachelor's and master's degrees in insurance and actuarial science. It provided professional exam preparatory seminars for insurance and actuarial science designations and held classes after business hours for working professionals in New York City. At its largest, total enrollment was approximately 400. Among the benefits of the college was its co-operative program. Although most students were employed by local insurers prior to enrolling at TCI, others were placed with an insurer who paid the student and often subsidized the student's tuition.

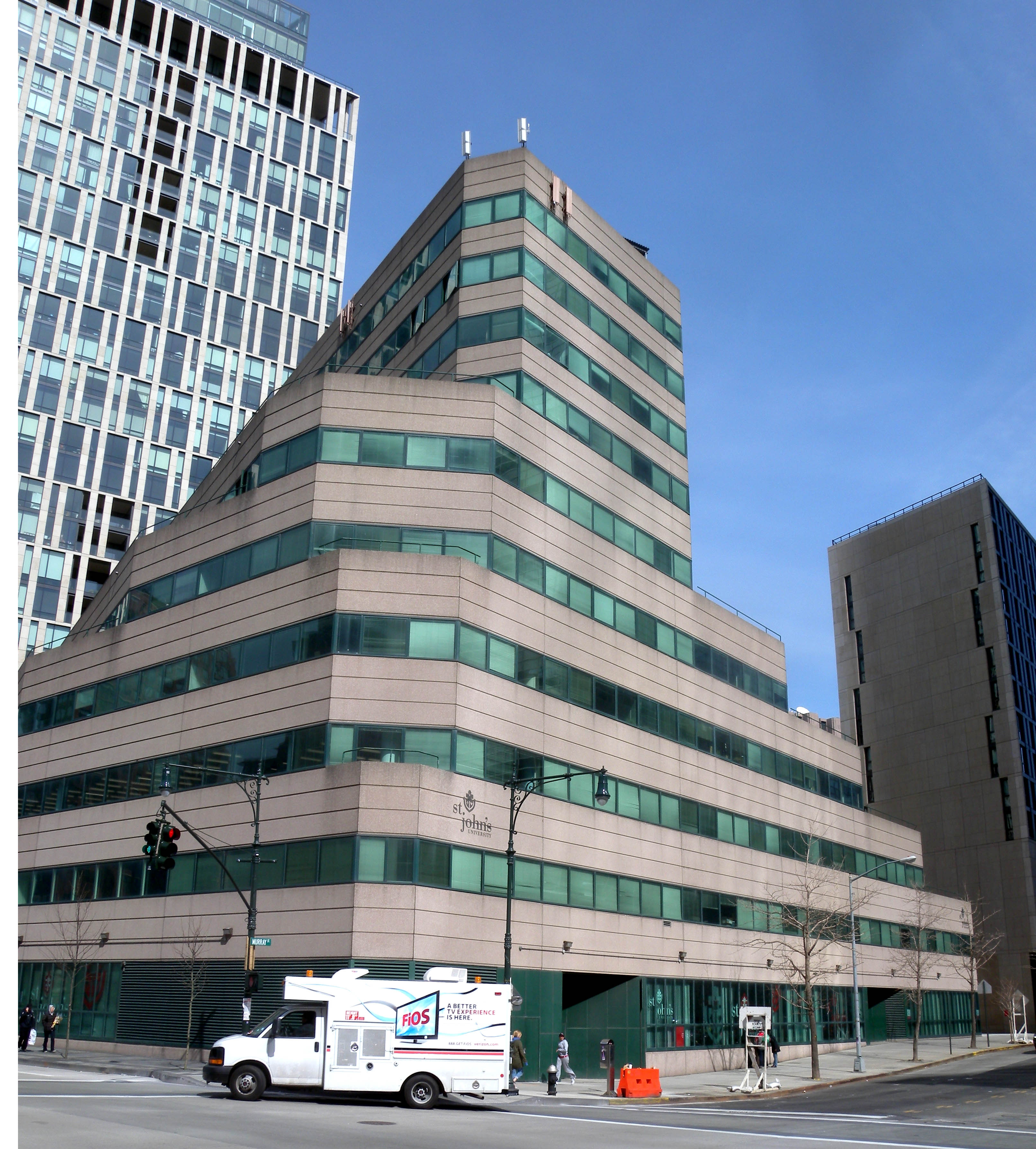
Former campus at 101 Murray Street

=== As a school of St. John's University ===
In 2001, St. John's University in Jamaica, New York took over the college's programs, creating The School of Risk Management, Insurance and Actuarial Science (SRM). The Manhattan location of the college now houses many graduate business and professional programs of St. John's Peter J. Tobin College of Business.

Until May 2014, the college was located within the Financial District of lower Manhattan, at 101 Murray Street. The college consisted of a ten-story building, including a five-story entrance atrium, 16 conference and seminar rooms, 24 classrooms, computer labs, a cafeteria, dormitories and the Kathryn and Shelby Cullom Davis Library.

Following the sale of the 101 Murray Street campus, the School of Risk Management including the Davis Library moved to St. John's new Manhattan location at 101 Astor Place, part of the Maki-designed office tower at 51 Astor. The previous building at Murray Street was demolished in May 2015.

== Kathryn and Shelby Cullom Davis Library ==
The Kathryn and Shelby Cullom Davis Library at the college comprises the world's largest collection of risk and insurance literature, policies, and related documents. Throughout its history, the library has served students, faculty, staff, and industry practitioners seeking specialized knowledge in risk management, insurance, and actuarial science. The library maintains the original archive of the Insurance Society of New York, as well as many historical insurance documents.

Under The Insurance Society of New York, a number of individuals and organizations contributed to the library's growing collection throughout the 1900s. In 1974, Shelby Cullom David and his wife Kathryn presented The College of Insurance with a major endowment. This endowment helped to secure the library's future and it was renamed in their honor. With the merger of The College of Insurance and St. John's University, the Davis Library became part of the St. John's University library system.

== Center for Professional Education ==
The Center for Professional Education is located within the School of Risk Management, Insurance and Actuarial Science. For over 30 years, the center has served the educational needs of more than 10,000 professionals in the insurance, risk management and financial services industry. The Center provides seminars, workshops, certificate programs and professional designation examination preparation courses for students of St. John's School of Risk Management within the Tobin College of Business, and working professionals in the New York City area. The Center for Professional Education also provides consulting services to the industry, governments and regulators worldwide.

== See also ==
- List of defunct colleges and universities in New York
