= Cornelius Vander Starr =

American businessman

- Born: October 15, 1892; Fort Bragg, California, U.S.
- Died: December 20, 1968 (aged 76)
- Other names: Neil Starr, C. V. Starr
- Education: University of California, Berkeley
- Occupation: Businessman
- Known for: Founder of C.V. Starr & Co. and the American International Group and AIA Group

Cornelius Vander Starr (October 15, 1892 – December 20, 1968), known as Neil Starr, was an American businessman and founded the insurance and investment organization C.V. Starr & Co. (later known as Starr Companies) in Shanghai, China. 1919 he opened a subsidiary which became insurance giant American International Group (AIG) and AIA Group. AIG was the first international finance and insurance company and he became an intelligence asset under the Roosevelt presidency (1933–1945).

Ken Starr was his grand nephew.

AIG grew from an initial market value of $300 million to $180 billion, becoming the largest insurance company in the world.

== Early life ==
Starr was born to parents of Dutch ancestry. His father was a railroad engineer. The Special prosecutor Ken Starr (1946 – 2022) was his grand nephew. Starr attended University of California, Berkeley from 1910 to 1911 before dropping out and returning to his hometown of Fort Bragg, California.

He joined the U.S. Army in 1918 but was never deployed overseas because World War I had ended. He joined the Pacific Mail Steamship Company as a clerk in Yokohama, Japan. Later that year, he traveled to Shanghai where he worked for several insurance businesses.

== Starr Companies ==
In 1919 he founded what was then known as American Asiatic Underwriters (later American International Underwriters) in Shanghai, China, a global insurance and investment organization. After Japan invaded China in 1939, he moved his operation to New York to work for the Office of Strategic Services (OSS), the precursor to the CIA. During World War II Starr worked for the OSS, in 1943 he established the OSS insurance intelligence unit with William "Wild Bill" Donovan and served as the chief operative behind former U.S. Army Air Force officer Claire L. Chennault.

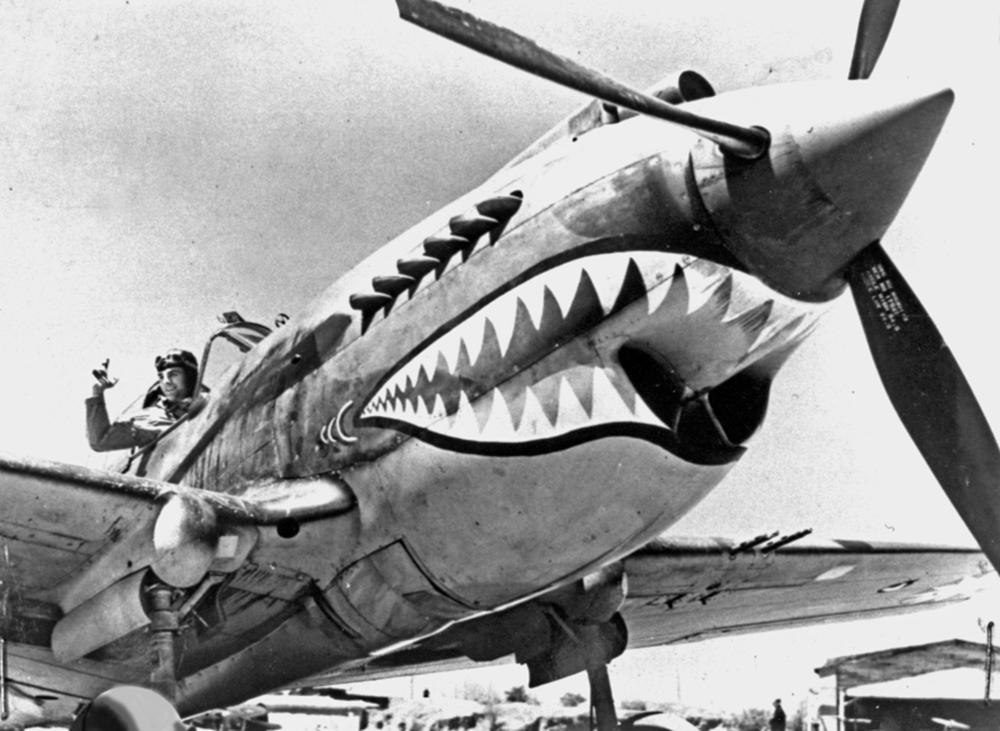
The First American Volunteer Group, the fighter aircraft known as ‘Flying Tigers’, was founded to help the Chinese in the fight against the Japanese occupiers

Chennault is best known for coordinating the OSS-bankrolled American Volunteer Group (better known as the "Flying Tigers") to bring the fight to the Japanese without a declaration of war and return Generalissimo Chiang Kai-shek to dominance in China. Starr and the OSS later backed Chiang over Communist leader Mao Zedong.

In 2000, war correspondent and author Mark Fritz wrote in the article entitled The Secret (Insurance) Agent Men for the Los Angeles Times:

They knew which factories to burn, which bridges to blow up, which cargo ships could be sunk in good conscience. They had pothole counts for roads used for invasion and head counts for city blocks marked for incineration. They weren't just secret agents. They were secret insurance agents. These undercover underwriters gave their World War II spymasters access to a global industry that both bankrolled and, ultimately, helped bring down Adolf Hitler's Third Reich.

After World War II, Starr hired O.S.S. captain Duncan Lee, a lawyer, who became the long-term general counsel of AIG.

AIG left China in early 1949, as Mao led the advance of the Communist People's Liberation Army on Shanghai, and Starr moved the company headquarters to its current home in New York City. AIG was the world's largest insurance company, and as of 2021 remains unchallenged in that respect.

== Legacy ==
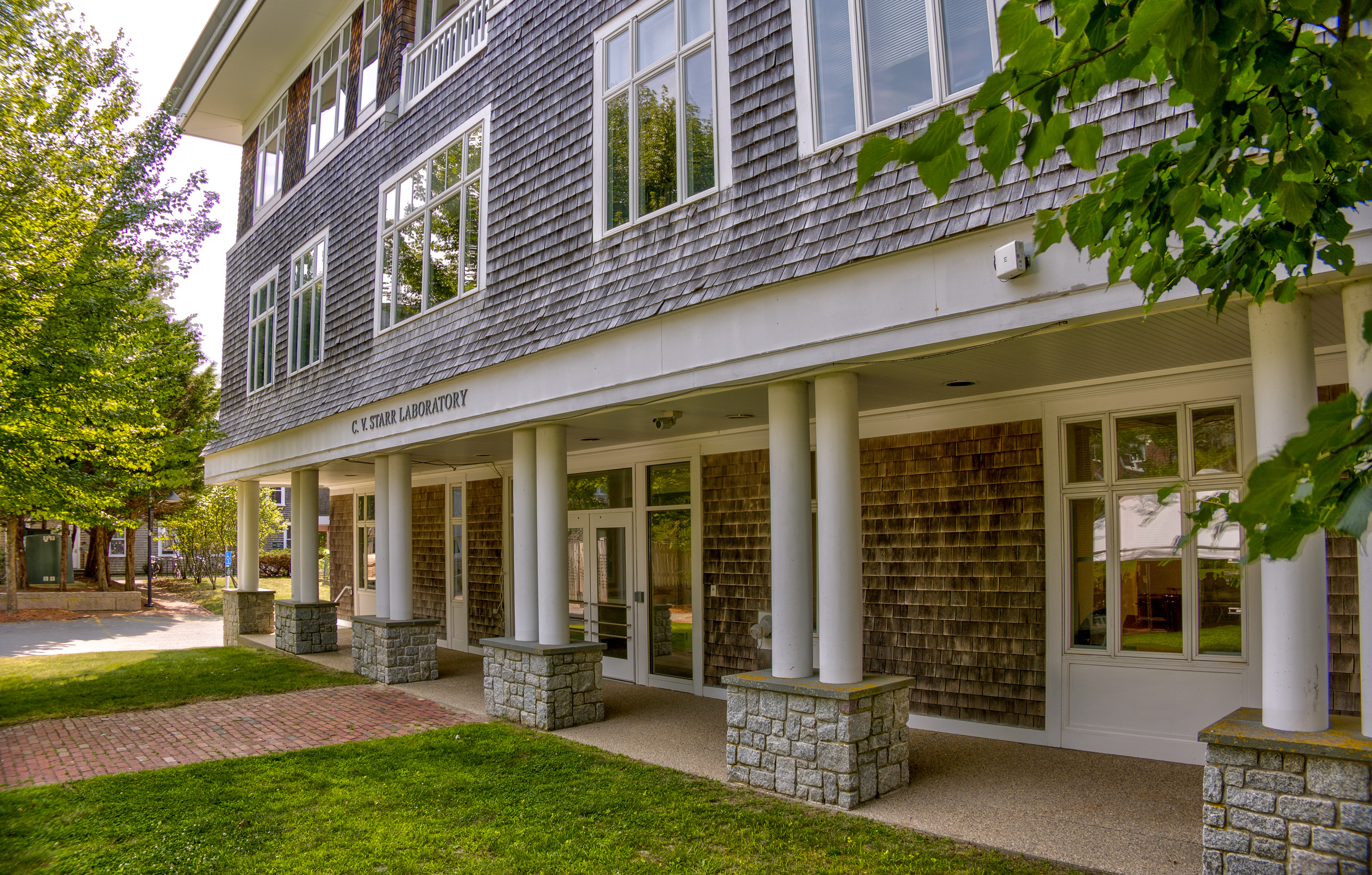
C.V. Starr Laboratory at the Marine Biological Laboratory at Woods Hole, Massachusetts

In 1955 he founded the C. V. Starr Foundation, to which he left his entire residuary estate, after a small proportion in the eight figures along with his home in Brewster was awarded to his niece upon his death in 1968. He set up several other trusts for his close relatives. The sum of money left to his niece and relatives (not including the majority of his wealth left to charity) would have been worth several billion USD in the 21st century. Since its founding, the foundation has made more than $3.8 billion in grants worldwide in education, medicine and healthcare, human needs, public policy, culture, and the environment.

The C.V. Starr East Asian Library at Columbia University was named for Starr in recognition of an endowment gift by the Starr Foundation in 1981. Starr's alma mater, Berkeley, is also home to the C. V. Starr East Asian Library, which houses 900,000 volumes in Chinese, Japanese, Korean, and other East Asian languages, making it one of the top two such collections in the United States outside of the Library of Congress. Students at Hofstra University will know C.V. Starr Hall as home to the Frank G. Zarb School of Business, a state-of-the-art technologically advanced building, which opened for classes in the fall of 2000 and houses the Martin B. Greenberg Trading Room complete with a stock ticker that is delayed only 15 minutes from Wall Street. The C.V. Starr Center for the Study of the American Experience in Chestertown, MD, works in conjunction with Washington College to promote the American Pictures Series at the National Portrait Gallery in Washington D.C.

Starr was also an early investor in skiing at Mount Mansfield in Stowe, Vermont, acquiring the Stowe Mountain Resort in 1949. It passed on to AIG in 1988. One of the famous Front Four double diamond trails there is named Starr in his honor, as is the base lodge of the Middlebury Bowl, the private ski slope belonging to Middlebury College in Vermont.

Business positions
New title	President of American International Underwriters; 1919–1968	Succeeded by Maurice R. Greenberg
