= Maurice R. Greenberg =

American business executive (born 1925)

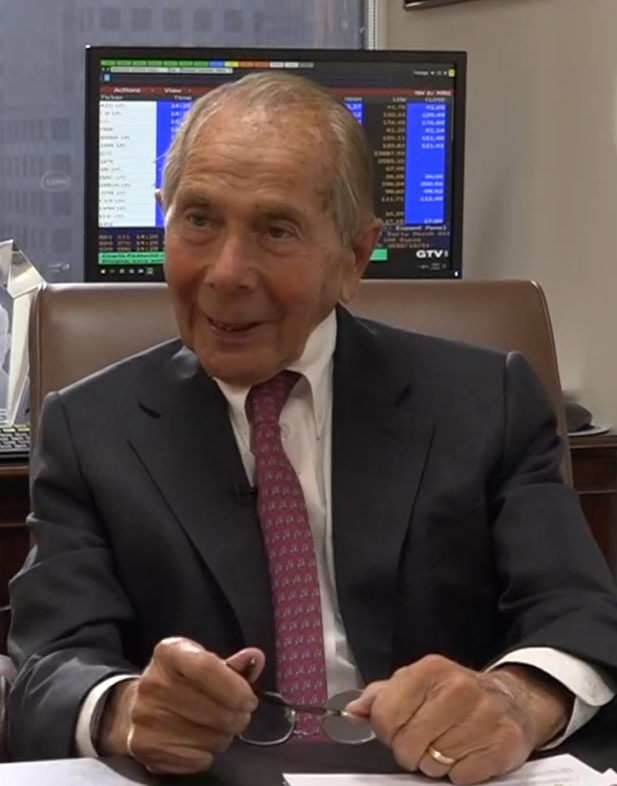
- Greenberg in 2019
- Born: Maurice Raymond Greenberg; May 4, 1925 (age 101); New York City, U.S.
- Education: University of Miami (BA); New York Law School (LLB)
- Political party: Republican
- Spouse: Corinne Zuckerman (m. 1950; died 2024)
- Children: 4, including Jeffrey and Evan

Maurice Raymond "Hank" Greenberg (born May 4, 1925) is an American business executive and former chairman and chief executive officer of American International Group (AIG).

== Early life and education ==
Greenberg was born into a Jewish family in Greenwich Village, New York City. His father, Jacob Greenberg, died when Hank was six and his mother, Ada Rheingold, married a dairy farmer.

Greenberg served in the United States Army in Europe during World War II, participating in Operation Overlord at Normandy, the liberation of Dachau concentration camp, and in the Korean War, rising to the rank of captain. He received the Bronze Star, and the French Legion of Honour as a result of his military service in the European theatre of World War II.

Greenberg attended the University of Miami, where he was a member of Sigma Alpha Mu fraternity, and received his bachelor's degree in 1948. In 1950, he obtained his law degree from New York Law School. He was admitted to the New York Bar in 1953 but did not practice law. He holds honorary degrees from Brown University, Middlebury College, New York Law School, and The Rockefeller University.

== Career ==
In 1962, Greenberg was named by AIG's founder, Cornelius Vander Starr, as the head of AIG's North American holdings after working for Continental Casualty Company, a unit of CNA in Chicago. In 1968 Starr picked Greenberg as his successor. Greenberg held the position until March 2005, when he retired from AIG and was replaced by Martin J. Sullivan. Greenberg was a social friend and client of Henry Kissinger. In 1987, he appointed Kissinger as chairman of AIG's International Advisory Board.

In 2008, he appeared on ABC's Good Morning America, criticizing the board of directors of AIG. In an interview with Reactions magazine in March 2010, serialized over three parts, Greenberg stated that he did not condone AIG's strategy of selling non-core assets to pay back the United States government, and believed the terms under which AIG was provided access to bail-out funds needed to be renegotiated.

=== C.V. Starr ===
He is chairman and chief executive officer of C.V. Starr, a global insurance and investment organization that is named for the founder of AIG, Cornelius Vander Starr. He joined C.V. Starr as vice president in 1960 and was given the additional responsibilities of president of American Home Assurance Company in 1962. He was elected director of C.V. Starr in 1965, chairman and chief executive officer in 1968 and continues in that role. Greenberg is also the chairman of the board of directors and managing director of Starr International Company Inc. C.V. Starr and Starr International are collectively known as the Starr Companies. Greenberg was named the most connected business executive in New York by Crain's New York Business.

In February 2014, Greenberg led a group through Starr Investment Holdings that acquired health insurance claims processor MultiPlan Inc. for around $4.4 billion. This group, on May 5, 2016, sold MultiPlan Inc. to Hellman & Friedman for approximately $7.5 billion. Under Greenberg's leadership, Starr has invested more than $1 billion in China since 2005. Starr led the IPO for the People's Insurance Company of China (PICC), and acquired Dazhong Insurance, the first privatization of a state-owned insurance company.

== Legal issues ==
In August 2009, the U.S. Securities and Exchange Commission charged Greenberg for his involvement in alleged fraudulent accounting transactions that inflated AIG's finances. Without conceding or denying the SEC charges, Greenberg agreed to pay $15 million in penalties.

The New York Attorney General brought civil fraud charges against Greenberg in May 2005, charging him with engaging in fraud to exaggerate AIG's finances. On September 13, 2016, the fraud case against Greenberg came to trial in a state courthouse in Lower Manhattan. The New York State trial counsel said a guilty verdict was needed to "send a message to CEOs of other companies" that "you can't do this sort of thing." The case was resolved on February 10, 2017, subject to a settlement in which Greenberg admitted to fraud and agreed to pay $9 million.

In late 2011, Greenberg's Starr International announced a lawsuit against the federal government. According to Reuters, the lawsuit requested $55.5 billion in damages against the government stemming from the government's financial bailout of AIG in 2008. Following a trial in Fall 2014, the Court of Federal Claims ruled in June 2015 that the federal government acted without authority, but did not award any damages. On appeal, US Court of Appeals for the Federal Circuit threw out the original case, ruling that Starr lacked standing to bring the case, holding that standing belonged solely to AIG, which had not sued. The Supreme Court declined in 2018 to review the case. The market value of the 79.9% of AIG common stock the government acquired on the day the government agreed to loan AIG up to $85 billion was $55.4 billion. By the end of 2012, AIG had repaid all of its loans and the government had made a $17.7 billion profit on the AIG equity it had acquired as a result, plus $6.7 billion in interests and fees.

In November 2012, a Manhattan court dismissed Greenberg's claims that the Federal Reserve Bank of New York breached its fiduciary duties to AIG shareholders. The ruling was upheld in appeals court in January 2014.

In July 2013 Greenberg filed a civil lawsuit against New York Attorney General Eliot Spitzer alleging that Spitzer made repeated defamatory statements against him. In November 2020, a judge dismissed Greenberg's defamation case against Spitzer.

In December 2013, Greenberg filed a complaint with the New York State Joint Commission on Public Ethics alleging that New York State Attorney General Eric Schneiderman had violated the state's public officer's law by making disparaging comments about him that could potentially taint a jury selection in any trial.

== Public positions ==
In 1990, Greenberg was appointed by Zhu Rongji, then Mayor of Shanghai, to be the first chairman of the International Business Leaders' Advisory Council for the Mayor of Shanghai. In 1994 Greenberg was appointed senior economic advisor to the Beijing municipal government. He was awarded "Honorary Citizen of Shanghai" in 1997. He is a member of the advisory board of the Tsinghua School of Economics and Management, a member of the International Advisory Council of the China Development Research Foundation and China Development Bank. Greenberg was appointed as a member of the Hong Kong Chief Executive's Council of International Advisers from 1998 to 2005. He is a member of the US-China Business Council, honorary chair of the U.S.-China Policy Foundation and is vice-chairman of the board of directors of the National Committee on United States – China Relations. Greenberg sits on the steering committee of the China–United States Exchange Foundation. The Maurice "Hank" Greenberg Scholarship, administered in his name by the US–China Education Trust, supports the studies of ten Chinese students from low-income families each year at Yunnan University. Greenberg was presented the Friendship Medal for Contribution to China's Reform by President Xi Jinping in 2018.

In July 2022, Greenberg announced the founding of a group composed of senior U.S. business and policy leaders who share the view that the United States should engage more constructively with China. Greenberg stated, "The deteriorating state of affairs between the U.S. has destabilized the most important bilateral relationship in the world," and the new group is intended to "help foster a meaningful but frank exchange between the U.S. and Chinese governments on issues of mutual concern."

He is founding chairman of the U.S.-Philippine Business Committee, chairman emeritus of the US-ASEAN Business Council and chairman of the U.S.-Korea Business Council. Greenberg has served on the board of directors of the New York Stock Exchange, the President's Advisory Committee for Trade Policy and Negotiations, and the Business Roundtable and is a member of the Board of Directors of the Peterson Institute for International Economics. He was a director of the Federal Reserve Bank of New York from 1988-1995 and served as its Chairman 1994-1995. He was awarded "CEO of the Year 2003" by Chief Executive magazine.

Greenberg was vice chairman and director of the Council on Foreign Relations and a member of the Trilateral Commission. He is a former chairman and current trustee of the Asia Society, a trustee emeritus of the Rockefeller University and is an honorary trustee of the Museum of Modern Art. Greenberg is chairman emeritus of the Board of Trustees of New York-Presbyterian Hospital having joined the Board in 1979. He serves as a member of the board of overseers of the Weill Cornell Medical College of Cornell University, as a life trustee of New York University, a trustee for the School of Risk Management, Insurance, and Actuarial Science and is the chairman of the Academic Medicine Development Company (AMDeC) Foundation. Greenberg also serves as a member of the President's Council on International Activities of Yale University. and on the board of the Manhattan Institute for Policy Research. He is the former chairman of The National Interest. He is on the board of directors of the International Rescue Committee, is a former trustee of the American Museum of Natural History and is active in a number of other civic and charitable organizations. As chairman of The Starr Foundation, Greenberg oversees the disbursement of major financial support to academic, medical, cultural and public policy institutions.

=== Incident with Mahmoud Ahmadinejad ===
Greenberg gained visibility when he clashed with Mahmoud Ahmadinejad over the Iranian president's denial of the Holocaust. On September 20, 2006, the Council on Foreign Relations hosted a small meeting of select council members with Ahmadinejad, who began by saying that we need to "continue studying" whether it happened. According to David E. Sanger, Chief Washington Correspondent for The New York Times, Greenberg listened for fifteen minutes while Ahmadinejad continued talking about the Palestinians, World War II, and if the Holocaust killings had happened at all. Sanger writes, "Then Hank Greenberg, who had been on a slow boil through the evening, spoke up. He had been a young soldier at the end of the war, and participated in the liberation of the camps. 'I went through Dachau in the war and saw with my own eyes.'" President Ahmadinejad responded by asking if Greenberg was old enough to have participated in the liberation of Dachau. "I'd like an answer regarding whether you think the Holocaust occurred," insisted Greenberg. To which Ahmadinejad replied "I think we should allow more impartial studies to be done on this."

== Political involvement ==
Greenberg is a Republican donor. He donated to Mitt Romney's presidential candidacy.

In the 2016 Republican Party presidential primaries, he donated $10 million to support Jeb Bush's candidacy and at a later point also donated $5 million to Conservative Solutions PAC which supported Marco Rubio's campaign.

== Maurice R. Greenberg Fellowships ==
There are a number of Maurice R. Greenberg Fellowships:

- Maurice R. Greenberg Chair in China Studies, Council on Foreign Relations (senior fellowship).
- Maurice R. Greenberg World Fellows Program, Yale University

== Personal life ==
Greenberg married Corinne Phyllis Zuckerman in 1950 and they remained together until her death at age 95 on March 17, 2024. They have four children:

- Jeffrey W. Greenberg, former chairman and chief executive officer of Marsh & McLennan Companies, chairman and CEO of Aquiline Capital Partners, which he founded in 2005 in New York.
- Evan G. Greenberg, chairman and chief executive officer of Chubb Ltd and Chubb Group.
- L. Scott Greenberg, venture capitalist in New York.
- Cathleen Greenberg London, physician

On May 4, 2025, Greenberg turned 100.

== Works by and about Hank Greenberg ==
Greenberg and Lawrence A. Cunningham wrote The AIG Story, published in 2013. Greenberg's career is chronicled in the 2006 book Fallen Giant: The Amazing Story of Hank Greenberg and the History of AIG. He and his son, Jeffrey, are also discussed in the 2011 book All the Devils Are Here: The Hidden History of the Financial Crisis. Greenberg is discussed in the 2011 book, Wealth Management: Private Banking, Investment Decisions, and Structured Financial Products He is noted in the 2012 book, Black 9/11: Money, Motive and Technology

== Awards ==
- 2015: Commander of the Legion of Honour
- 2014: Legion of Honour
- 2009: Double Helix Medal
- 1952: Bronze Star Medal, for service in Korean War

Business positions
Preceded by Cornelius Vander Starr	Chairman of American International Group; 1967–2005	Succeeded by Robert B. Willumstad
Preceded by Cornelius Vander Starr	CEO of American International Group; 1967–2005	Succeeded by Martin J. Sullivan
Preceded by Cornelius Vander Starr	Chairman & CEO of C.V. Starr & Company; 1968–present	Incumbent
