= Michel Khalaf =

President and CEO, MetLife, Inc.

Michel Abbas Khalaf (born 1964) is a Lebanese-American business executive. He has been the president and CEO of MetLife since May 2019. Prior to becoming CEO, he held senior executive positions at MetLife since 2011, and before that spent 21 years in increasingly senior positions at Alico, which MetLife acquired in 2010.

== Early life and education ==
Khalaf was born and raised in Lebanon. He is the son of Abbas Khalaf, who was Lebanon's Minister of Economy and Trade from 1974-1975. His sister is Roula Khalaf, who has been editor-in-chief of the Financial Times since 2020.

Khalaf was educated at the International College, Beirut. He moved to the United States for university, and at Syracuse University obtained a BS in engineering in 1985 and an MBA in finance in 1989.

== Career ==
=== Alico ===
Khalaf began his career in 1989 as an investment officer at American Life Insurance Company (Alico), AIG's overseas unit which sold life, accident, and health insurance, plus retirement and wealth management products. He initially spent 21 years at Alico, eventually holding a number of leadership roles in various markets including the Caribbean, France, Italy, Egypt, Poland, Romania, and the Philippines.

In 1996, he became the first general manager of Alico’s operation in Egypt. In 2001, he was appointed as regional senior vice president in charge of Alico's life insurance, pension, and mutual fund operations in Poland, Romania, and the Baltics, and was also named president and CEO of Alico's life insurance subsidiary in Poland, Amplico Life.

In 2006, he was made deputy president and COO of Philamlife, AIG's operating company in the Philippines. He became regional president of Middle East, Africa, and South Asia (MEASA) at the company in 2008.

=== MetLife ===
Upon MetLife's acquisition of Alico in 2010, Khalaf became executive vice president and CEO of MetLife’s Middle East, Africa, and South Asia (MEASA) region. In 2011, he became part of MetLife's executive group, and president of the company's Europe, Middle East, and Africa (EMEA) division. In 2017, his position was expanded to president of U.S. Business and EMEA. In this role, he oversaw the group benefits, retirement and income services, and property and casualty insurance businesses in the United States; global employee benefits providing employee benefits services to employers; and individual and group insurance businesses sold in Europe, the Middle East, and Africa.

On May 1, 2019, Khalaf succeeded Steven Kandarian as MetLife's CEO and president. As CEO, he introduced a five-year plan that year called Next Horizon, with the stated goal of focusing, simplifying, and differentiating the company. In 2024 he introduced a new five-year business plan called New Frontier, to boost long-term growth via profit growth, expense reductions, and increased free cash flow.

== Board memberships ==
In addition to being the firm's president and CEO, Khalaf is on the board of directors of MetLife. He serves on the board of the Geneva Association. He is a member of the Business Roundtable and The Business Council.

== Personal life ==
Khalaf is married to Andrea Khalaf, and they are based in New York City.
