= Brian Duperreault =

American executive

- Born: May 8, 1947 (age 79); Paget, Bermuda
- Education: Saint Joseph's University (B.S.)
- Occupation: Insurance executive
- Years active: 1973–present

Brian Charles Duperreault (born May 8, 1947) is a Bermudian insurance executive.

Duperreault is executive chairman of Cedar Trace Limited, a Bermuda-based re/insurer underwriting property, casualty and specialty insurance. His career began in 1973 as an actuary at American International Group. He eventually headed all of AIG's international operations. He was regarded as a likely successor to CEO Hank Greenberg, but as Greenberg showed no signs of retiring Duperreault left AIG in 1994 to head ACE Limited, a boutique specialty-insurance company based in Bermuda. During his 10 years as chairman and CEO of ACE Limited, Duperreault transformed it into global multi-line insurance and reinsurance powerhouse.

After retiring in 2006, upon request Duperreault came out of retirement in January 2008 to turn around the ailing Marsh & McLennan Companies, which was still suffering after a 2004 bid-rigging scandal that cost the company both hundreds of millions of dollars and also its reputation and morale. In his five years as president and CEO of Marsh & McLennan Companies, Duperreault returned it to profitability and growth, rebuilt morale and reputation, and revived the confidence of investors and clients.

Duperreault retired again on December 31, 2012, but soon became interested enough in cutting-edge data analytics to create an insurance company focused on advanced data science with the co-founders of the hedge fund Two Sigma Investments, a leader in quantitative analysis. The result was Hamilton Insurance Group, founded in Bermuda in December 2013 with Duperreault as CEO. He grew the company via acquisitions, including insurance and reinsurance, operations in the U.S., and a syndicate at Lloyd's of London. In late 2016, Hamilton Insurance Group also partnered with AIG and Two Sigma to create Attune, a data-enabled, algorithm-driven company that sells commercial insurance online to small and medium-sized businesses.

In 2017, AIG, still underperforming after its long saga following the 2008 financial crisis, called upon Duperreault to turn around the company following then-CEO Peter Hancock's March 2017 resignation. Duperreault was hired as CEO of AIG In May 2017. He began his tenure as CEO by immediately curtailing share buybacks and instead using capital for acquisitions. He installed a new team of top-tier senior management and 125 senior underwriters to execute his vision of tighter efficiencies and smarter risk-taking. He also eliminated AIG's prior separation into commercial and consumer businesses, instead restructuring the company into three new units: General Insurance, Life and Retirement, and a stand-alone technology unit called Blackboard Insurance which had been Hamilton's U.S. division acquired by AIG upon his hiring.

He stepped down as executive chairman of AIG in December 2021.

== Early life and education ==
Duperreault was born in Paget, Bermuda in 1947. His parents had separated before he was born, and in order to be near her closest friend, his mother had moved to Bermuda. A Catholic single mother, after his birth she moved with her 5-month-old son to Trenton, New Jersey where her sister lived, and worked as an accountant. Duperreault was educated at Catholic schools, graduating in 1965 from St. Anthony High School, since renamed Trenton Catholic Academy.

He attended Saint Joseph's University in Philadelphia, where he received a B.S. in mathematics in 1969.

He began to pursue a master's degree in mathematics at the University of Maryland but was drafted in November 1969. After receiving a waiver to complete his first year of study there, he enlisted in the U.S. Army in May 1970 and spent three years at Fort Knox, Kentucky.

Duperreault had originally thought of becoming a professor of mathematics but, newly married, he decided he wanted a better income than an academic life could provide. After he was discharged from the army, he researched job ideas at a library, where he learned about the actuary profession.

== Career ==
=== AIG 1973–1994 ===
At the age of 26 in 1973, shortly after completing his military service, Duperreault was hired at AIG as an actuary. AIG at the time was a midsize property-casualty insurer, and was in the early stages of its transformation by CEO Maurice R. "Hank" Greenberg into one of the world's largest financial services firms.

Duperreault rose steadily through several leadership positions. He was chief actuary from 1978 to 1981, senior vice president of AIG subsidiary American Home Assurance from 1981 through 1988, and chief casualty officer from 1985 through 1987. He became one of AIG's most senior executives. From 1989 until 1991 he was CEO of AIG affiliates in Japan and Korea. From 1991 to April 1994 he was president of American International Underwriters, AIG's overseas property-casualty insurance unit. In June 1993 while still president of American International Underwriters he was concurrently named to the additional position of executive vice president of AIG's Foreign General Insurance, and in April 1994 he was promoted from president to chairman and CEO of American International Underwriters; in these two positions he headed AIG's entire international operations.

He was long considered by industry colleagues and Wall Street analysts to be a potential successor to Greenberg, but Greenberg showed no signs of retiring, and after 21 years at AIG, Duperreault resigned in September 1994 to head ACE Limited, one of AIG's competitors.

=== ACE Limited ===
In October 1994 Duperreault became the chairman, president, and CEO of ACE Limited, which at the time was a boutique specialty insurance company based in Bermuda with 50 employees. He greatly expanded and diversified the company, particularly via targeted acquisitions. He quickly added new lines of insurance, including satellite, financial lines, aviation, and excess property coverages. In 1996 he led the acquisitions of Tempest Re and Lloyd's managing agencies Methuen and Ockham. In 1997 ACE entered a joint venture to create Sovereign Risk Insurance, to provide political risk insurance around the world. In 1998 he led the acquisitions of Tarquin plc, CAT Limited, and Westchester Specialty Group. In 1999 he made ACE's largest and most significant acquisition, Insurance Company of North America, the global property and casualty insurance division of CIGNA, and ACE also acquired Capital Re Corporation. In 2001 Duperreault restructured ACE's operations into two main groups, ACE U.S and Bermuda, and ACE International, with each group headed by its own chief executive. In 2002 ACE partnered with and acquired the largest stake in Huatai Insurance Company of China, allowing both companies to jointly develop new products and services for delivery nationally in China.

Having transformed ACE from a niche boutique Bermuda-based insurer to a major global multi-line insurer and reinsurer with more than 9,000 employees operating in 50 countries, Duperreault resigned as CEO of the company in May 2004, having resigned as president in November 1999. He retained his position as chairman of the board, and his successor as president and CEO was Evan Greenberg, son of AIG CEO Hank Greenberg and one of Duppereault's protege's while he was at AIG; Duperreault had hired him away from AIG in 2001 to head Ace Tempest Re. Duperreault's leadership of ACE for 10 years has been credited as instrumental in transforming Bermuda from an island nation with a small, reinsurance-focused market into a global insurance center.

In September 2004, four months after he stepped down as CEO, the ACE Limited board of directors honored Duperreault by establishing and funding the Brian Duperreault Endowed Chair for Risk Management and Insurance at Duperreault's alma mater, Saint Joseph's University.

In May 2006 Duperreault retired, becoming non-executive chairman of ACE.

=== Marsh & McLennan Companies ===
Two years after retiring in 2006, upon request Duperreault came out of retirement in January 2008 to be president and CEO of the New York-based global firm Marsh & McLennan Companies (MMC), one of the world's two largest insurance brokerages, which had helped found ACE Limited in 1985 and which was one of AIG's broker partners. The company was in the midst of a serious crisis, suffering heavy outflows from a bid-rigging scandal in 2004 that cost an initial $850 million settlement in 2005, plus additional substantial annual costs and a prohibition on contingent commissions. Due to that 2004-2005 insurance probe by New York Attorney General Eliot Spitzer, which alleged MMC had falsified and rigged bids on contracts and favored insurers at the expense of clients in return for higher commissions, the company had also sustained reputational and morale damage, lost business, and talent loss. Additional problems included excess capacity, lawsuits, organization issues, and very low brokerage margins, and shareholders were insisting that the company be broken up.

Duperreault immediately put into action an emergency turnaround program, announcing plans to divest underperforming assets and immediately lay off hundreds of employees in an effort to restore profitability. He also quickly built a strong new executive management team at the corporate and operating levels, implemented greater expense discipline across the company, and evaluated the overall business for fit and synergy.

In May 2008 he announced he would try to sell the risk-consulting and corporate-investigator firm Kroll Inc.'s government services business and also Kroll Factual Data, which provides services to mortgage lenders; he also announced that he would cut Kroll staff, and he moved Kroll's corporate advisory and restructuring business into a separate unit. After incrementally selling off some of Kroll's divisions over a two-year period, in 2010 he sold Kroll Inc. entirely.

In 2009 he led MMC to settle an investor lawsuit over the 2004 bid-rigging scandal without admitting or denying wrongdoing.

While continuing to reorganize and streamline MMC, Duperreault also acquired and integrated a number of smaller companies to grow the business. He also established Marsh & McLennan Agency, aimed at serving the insurance and advisory needs of smaller and emerging U.S. companies, and grew it substantially via acquisitions.

In 2011 he was named to the U.S. Treasury's inaugural Federal Advisory Committee on Insurance, and in 2012 he was named its first chairman.

After five years as president and CEO of Marsh & McLennan Companies, Duperreault retired on December 31, 2012. He had streamlined costs, the company, the workforce, and service delivery, returned MMC to profitability and growth, rebuilt morale and reputation, and revived the confidence of investors and clients. He had also established a long-term strategy as a foundation for continued success after his departure.

=== Hamilton Insurance Group ===
In 2013 Duperreault became intrigued with the use of cutting-edge data analytics and data science in insurance, after meeting with co-founders of the hedge fund Two Sigma Investments, a leader in quantitative analysis. He came out of retirement a second time to co-found Hamilton Insurance Group in December 2013 with the principals of Two Sigma, and to be its CEO. The focus of Hamilton is applying advanced data analytics and cutting-edge data-science techniques to the property-casualty insurance industry, in order to determine which risks to take and at what price.

Hamilton Insurance Group's initial action in December 2013 was purchasing the recently operational reinsurance business of the beleaguered hedge fund SAC Capital Advisors, called SAC Re and located in Bermuda, and renaming it Hamilton Re, with Duperreault as CEO. In January 2014 Sanford I. Weill, the former head of Citigroup, was hired as the Chairman of Hamilton Insurance Group and Hamilton Re.

Needing a balance of insurance and reinsurance, in 2014 Duperreault set up a Hamilton operation in the U.S., acquiring two U.S.-based Fairfax Financial Holdings insurance subsidiaries, and in April 2015 also acquired Sportscover Underwriting, a managing agency with a syndicate at Lloyd's, renamed Hamilton at Lloyd's. Hamilton became a Bermuda-based holding company of property and casualty insurance and reinsurance operations in Bermuda, the U.S., and the UK.

In February 2016, Weill retired as Chairman of Hamilton Insurance Group and Hamilton Re, and Duperreault succeeded him, retaining his position as CEO.

In late 2016, Hamilton Insurance Group partnered with AIG and Two Sigma to create Attune, a data-enabled, algorithm-driven company that sells commercial insurance online to small and medium-sized businesses, with Duperreault as chairman.

=== AIG ===
In May 2017, Duperreault was hired as CEO of AIG, following Peter Hancock's March 2017 announcement to step down under pressure after what had been a significant period of disappointing financial results. Since late 2008 the AIG conglomerate had sold off many of its businesses to pay off the $185 billion U.S. government bailout it received during the 2008 financial crisis. It was still struggling financially, its profit margins were notably low, it had had a decade of significant underwriting losses, and in addition to the loss of numerous businesses it had lost clients, reputation, talented people, and morale. Duperreault was its seventh CEO in 12 years.

In conjunction with Duperreault's hiring, AIG acquired Hamilton USA, its U.S. platform, and later renamed it Blackboard; AIG entered into a strategic reinsurance partnership with Hamilton Re; and Attune, the joint venture between AIG, Hamilton, and Two Sigma, expanded its target market to include larger companies. In addition, AIG partnered with Two Sigma to leverage its insurance-focused data science and technology expertise for AIG's global commercial-insurance underwriting.

Duperreault immediately announced that he would grow AIG, rather than shrink it or break it up. He also curtailed the practice of share buybacks, asserting that a better use of capital was acquisition of smaller companies.

In late September 2017, federal regulators removed AIG's too big to fail status. Four months later Duperreault acquired Bermuda-based Validus Holdings Ltd. The acquisition added business areas AIG didn't have, including reinsurance, a Lloyd's of London syndicate, insurance-linked securities, a specialist in U.S. small commercial excess and surplus underwriting, and crop insurance. The deal also brought in fresh underwriting talent, particularly in property risk and catastrophe risk. Also in 2018 he acquired Ellipse, a UK life insurance business, from Munich Re.

During his first year as CEO, Duperreault restructured the company into three new units: General Insurance, Life and Retirement, and a stand-alone technology unit called Blackboard Insurance; he eliminated AIG's prior separation into commercial and consumer businesses. He recruited or promoted more than a dozen top-tier senior executives and 125 senior underwriters to help execute his vision; this new management team included his former colleague Peter Zaffino of Marsh & McLennan Companies, whom Duperreault hired as executive vice president and global chief operating officer and also CEO of AIG's General Insurance business. He let his business heads set their own budgets and performance goals, gave underwriters more autonomy, and also took steps to make the job environment more amenable to younger, tech-savvy employees. He also instituted plans to cut costs and to exploit scale in dealing with suppliers and property expenses. He initiated company-wide efforts for smarter, better-calculated risk-taking in underwriting,

In February 2019 Duperreault noted that before his arrival as CEO a company-wide "go large" strategy at AIG had created out-sized risk, volatility, and losses, often exacerbated by multi-year contracts. He stated that his team was investigating and realigning every aspect of AIG's General Insurance risks, re-positioning its private-client personal-insurance portfolios to reduce catastrophe risk, and investing more heavily in technology in AIG's Life and Retirement units. He also said the new executive team had restructured AIG, re-underwritten its book of business, and overhauled its reinsurance buying strategy.

In June 2019 the company formed AIG Re, which consolidated its reinsurance operations, including Validus Re, AlphaCat, and Talbot Treaty, into one global business. In August 2019 AIG reported its second consecutive quarter of underwriting profits. Also in August 2019, Duperreault and Zaffino announced "AIG 200", a three-year company-wide program to improve its operational processes and infrastructure and substantially lower its expenses, by shedding legacy processes and excess manual interventions, modernizing and digitizing workflows, and unifying the company's operations. On 1 January, 2020, Zaffino succeeded Duperreault as AIG president. Then on March 1, 2021, Zaffino succeeded Duperreault as AIG's CEO, with Duperreault becoming executive chairman of the board.

=== Cedar Trace ===
Cedar Trace Limited is the holding company of the re/insurance platform Mereo Insurance. Launched in early 2025, Duperreault is the co-founder along with insurance industry veterans David Croom-Johnson and Richard Holden. The Bermuda-based company, which is licensed by the Bermuda Monetary Authority and holds an "A-" credit rating from AM Best, writes property, casualty and specialty insurance.

== Memberships ==
Duperreault is on the board of directors of the Geneva Association and the Partnership for New York City.

He is a member of the Wall Street Journal CEO Council.

He is on the board of trustees of Saint Joseph's University and is a director emeritus of the Bermuda Institute of Ocean Sciences (BIOS).

== Honors and awards ==
- Market Leader of the Year, from the Bermuda Insurance Institute (1998)
- Saint Joseph's University Haub School of Business Hall of Fame inductee (2002)
- Insurance Leader of the Year, from the School of Risk Management, St. John's University (2004)
- Lifetime Achievement Award from the Bermuda Insurance Institute (2007)
- Honorary Doctorate of commercial science from St. John's University (2006)
- Honorary Doctor of Humanities from Saint Joseph's University (2008)
- Business Achievement Award from Beta Gamma Sigma, the international business honor society (2009)
- Insurance Broking CEO of the Year in Reactions magazine's Global Market Awards (2011)
- Insurance Hall of Fame laureate (2011)
- Shield of Loyola Award from Saint Joseph's University (2011)
- Distinguished Leadership Award from the Insurance Society of Philadelphia (2011)
- Number 3 in Top 25 Living Legends of Insurance, by PropertyCasualty360 magazine (2012)
- One of 24 Key Influencers in the insurance industry, by Best's Review (2016)
- North America Influential Individual of the Year, from Reactions magazine (2017)
- Honoree, Harlem Educational Activities Fund (2018)

== Philanthropy and outreach ==
Duperreault donated $10 million to Saint Joseph’s University, his alma mater, making the largest individual gift in the history of the university. He also worked on charitable projects in China with former U.S. President Jimmy Carter.

He has played a significant role in developing Bermuda's charitable sector, and has been chairman of The Council Partners Charitable Trust, The Centre on Philanthropy, the Bermuda Institute of Ocean Sciences (BIOS), and other Bermuda non-profits. In 2004 he established the Duperreault Fellowship, an annual scholarship which supports the professional development of Bermuda residents working or studying in the field of substance abuse. In 2013 he chaired a non-paid six-month task force in Bermuda called the Spending and Government Efficiency (SAGE) Commission.

He has championed diversity in employment, and has spoken on the need to actively confront unconscious bias when hiring. He has also spoken repeatedly about gender bias, particularly in the insurance industry.

Since the mid-2010s Duperreault has led efforts to attract more Millennials to the insurance industry, both through outreach and through making the industry itself more empathetic, communicative, and tech-savvy – elements that Millennials want.

== Personal life ==
Duperreault is based in the New York City area. He and his wife Nancy have three adult sons. He is the godfather of actress Elizabeth Tulloch.

He credits his career success to his spirituality and his Jesuit education at Saint Joseph’s University. A devout Catholic, he has said of his faith, "It’s everything. It’s the essence of who I am. I try to pray for guidance all the time. It’s the best counsel you can seek." Duperreault claims the impact of his faith was most apparent when he was offered the opportunity to rehabilitate Marsh & McLennan Companies, which had been suffering organizational and financial woes.
