= Pavesich v. New England Life Insurance Company =

1905 court case in Georgia, US

Pavesich v. New England Life Insurance Company was a court case decided by the Georgia Supreme Court in 1905. It is noteworthy as one of the first explicit endorsements of the right to privacy as derived from natural law in US law. In 1997, author Judith Wagner DeCew stated, "Pavesich was the first case to recognize privacy as a right in tort law by invoking natural law, common law, and constitutional values." It has been cited in 209 US legal cases, including four US Supreme Court cases.

The case revolved around the New England Mutual Life Insurance Company (now MetLife) using an image of Paolo Pavesich in an advertisement that Pavesich considered a breach of privacy and libelous.
