= List of cases of Attorney General Eliot Spitzer =

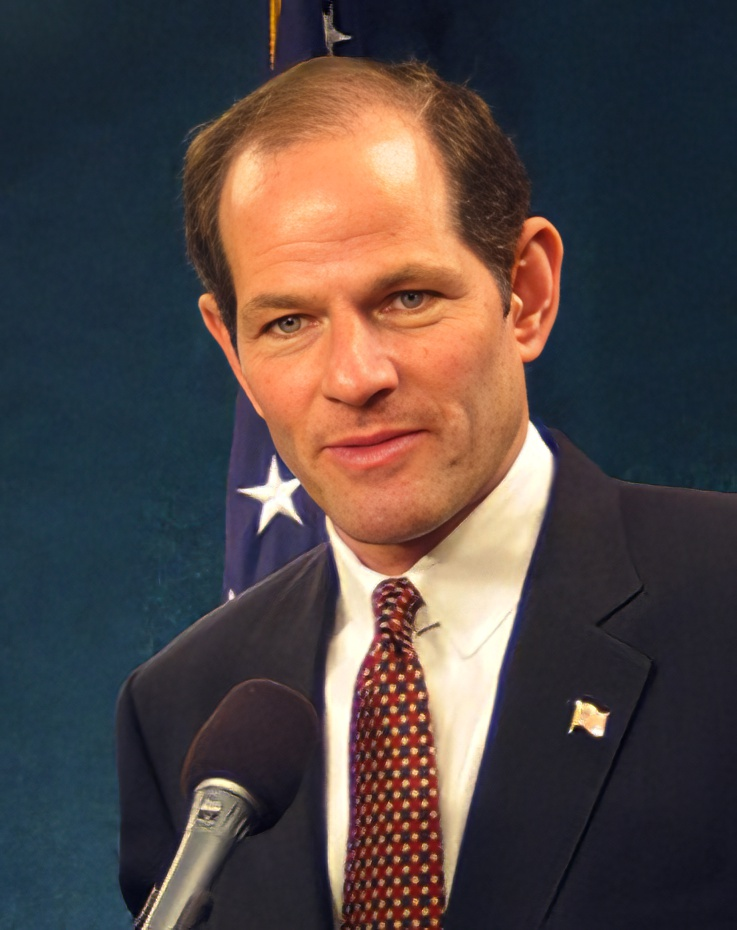
New York State Attorney General at New York Foreign Press Center Briefing on 'Issues Facing New York'

Eliot Spitzer, a Democrat, was Attorney General of New York State from the start of 1999 to the end of 2006. In addition to prosecutions and civil actions in the financial sector, he pursued cases in both state and federal courts involving pollution, entertainment, technology, occupational safety and health and other fields in which New York state plays a part in setting and maintaining national standards of conduct.

== Computer manufacturing ==
- Price fixing (2006): A long-running investigation of five computer chip manufacturers resulted in $730 million in fines and a guilty plea from Samsung Electronics Co., Elpida Memory Inc., Infineon Technologies AG and Hynix Semiconductor Inc. The fifth manufacturer, Micron Technology Inc., was granted immunity in exchange for cooperating with authorities in the case. This case is notable as one of the longest collusions between the largest number of companies to fix prices (1998–2002).

== Securities ==
- Global Analyst Research Settlements (2002): Spitzer sued several investment banks for inflating stock prices, using affiliated brokerage firms to give biased investment advice and "spin" initial public offerings of stock by offering them to CEOs and other influential members of the business community. In 2002, a settlement of these lawsuits was negotiated by Spitzer, federal regulatory bodies, stock exchanges, and the investment banks and brokerage houses in question. The result was $1.4 billion in compensation and fines paid by the brokerages and investment banks, new rules and enforcement bodies created to govern stock analysts and IPOs, and the insulation of brokerage firms from pressures by investment banks. Ten firms paid fines to settle the case: Bear Stearns, Credit Suisse First Boston, Deutsche Bank, Goldman Sachs, J.P. Morgan Chase, Lehman Brothers, Merrill Lynch, Morgan Stanley, Salomon Smith Barney, UBS Warburg.
- Late Trading & Market Timing Investigations (2003): Investigations by the office of Eliot Spitzer beginning in 2003 uncovered mutual fund brokers allowing select clients privileges deprived to ordinary customers. Spitzer targeted two practices in particular: "late trading", which allows hedge fund investors to file trades at the previous day's price after the market close, something ordinary customers cannot do; and "market timing", an investment strategy involving frequent trading, which was allowed by some funds for privileged investors in contravention of the fund's rules. Late trading was clearly illegal and allowed a small number of investors profit at the expense of other fund shareholders. In essence, by placing winning trades the privileged investors diluted the profit pool available to all fund shareholders while they sidestepped their share of the pool's losses. Market timing is still permissible provided a fund discloses that it permits it, and can both harm and benefit funds; the problem prior to 2003 was that some investors and brokers were permitted to engage in timing while others were not, and that fact was not disclosed to other investors. Both late trading and market timing can increase fund expenses and administrative fees borne by other customers and caused fund managers to increase the cash they held to meet liquidity needs. Through a number of prosecutions and lawsuits, joined in many instances by the U.S. Securities and Exchange Commission (SEC), Spitzer secured more than one billion dollars in fines and remuneration for investors as well as forcing reforms to further enforce pre-existing bans on late trading.
- Richard Grasso (Chairman of the NYSE): Eliot Spitzer charged that Dick Grasso, when chairman of the New York Stock Exchange violated his position as chairman of a non-profit organization (the NYSE was at that time a mutually owned not-for-profit exchange) by receiving excessive compensation. Dick Grasso argued that his compensation was openly declared at board meetings and was fully legal and that the lawsuit was an attack on him solely intended to raise Spitzer's image in the press as he went into his gubernatorial campaign. He vowed to fight the action in the courts and, despite losing the initial stages, on July 1, 2008, the New York State Court of Appeals dismissed all claims against Grasso. The majority opinion stated that since the NYSE was now a subsidiary of a for profit multi-national corporation that the State of New York had no oversight over the affairs of the company in this matter and that prosecution was "not in the public interest." Current Attorney General, Andrew Cuomo stated that he had no intention to appeal this decision any further and that the case was effectively over. The court ruled that Grasso was entitled to the entirety of his compensation.

== Insurance ==
- Contingent commissions (2004): In the commercial insurance business "contingent commissions" or "overriders" are fees paid based on the volume and profitability of insurance business generated by brokers. They provide incentive for agents and brokers to underwrite carefully as contingent commissions often serve as rewards for good loss ratios. Without contingency commissions, there is little incentive for agents or brokers to be selective in the risks that they submit to companies. However, some argue that contingent commissions may provide an incentive for insurance brokers to recommend more costly insurance to their clients, presenting a conflict of interest. While many large brokerages such as Marsh & McLennan Companies (against whom Spitzer filed his original suit), Aon and Willis announced plans to stop the practice of contingent commissions, many argued that the practice was not to blame for the rigged bids uncovered by Spitzer. Indeed, the practice accounted for about only five to seven percent of total revenues for brokers and did address a traditional misalignment of interests in insurance between the carrier and the producer. Under a traditional flat commission structure the latter has less incentive to submit risks with an eye for long-term loss potential in mind. So-called finite risk insurance products, which may more closely resemble a loan than insurance, were also investigated, even if there was "transference of risk" involved.
- American International Group (2005): On May 26, 2005, Spitzer filed a civil complaint against Maurice R. "Hank" Greenberg (Chairman and CEO) and Howard I. Smith (ex-CFO of AIG), alleging fraudulent business practice, securities fraud, common law fraud, and other violations of insurance and securities laws. Despite tough talk on a television news show, Spitzer declined to bring any criminal charges against Greenberg, and two of the civil charges were dropped in September 2006. The case was settled in 2017, with Greenberg and Smith agreeing to payments totaling $9.9 million.
- On December 22, 2005, John C. Whitehead, chairman of the Lower Manhattan Development Corporation, alleged that Spitzer had threatened him during a telephone call that took place in April 2005. In a letter to The Wall Street Journal, Whitehead alleged that Spitzer called him regarding a Wall Street Journal opinion piece that he wrote about Spitzer's public comments regarding Maurice R. Greenberg. According to the allegation, Spitzer threatened, "Mr. Whitehead, it's now a war between us and you've fired the first shot. I will be coming after you. You will pay the price. This is only the beginning and you will pay dearly for what you have done. You will wish you had never written that letter." Spitzer has denied the allegation.
- The insurance investigation started by Spitzer spread to other states. Illinois Attorney General Lisa Madigan announced a parallel investigation of insurance brokerages headquartered in Chicago, which led to substantial out-of-court settlements from AJ Gallagher and Willis. Although the practices of these insurance brokerages did not violate criminal law, they violated the code of professional ethics required by the state to obtain licenses. One of the practices alleged by Madigan was "steering" insurance clients to purchase insurance policies that would produce higher commissions for the brokerage.

== Entertainment ==
- An investigation of CD price fixing by 41 states led by Spitzer found between 1995 and 2000 music companies used illegal marketing agreements such as minimum advertised pricing to artificially inflate prices of compact discs. A settlement in 2002 included the music publishers and distributors; Sony Music, Warner Music, Bertelsmann Music Group, EMI Music, Universal Music. In restitution for price fixing they agreed to pay a $67.4 million fine and distribute $75.7 million in CDs to public and non-profit groups but admitted no wrongdoing. It is estimated customers were overcharged by nearly $500 million and up to $5 per album.
- Music Royalty Settlement (2004): Through an investigation of music industry practices, Spitzer's office uncovered $50 million in royalties owed to musicians whose record labels had failed to keep in contact with them. Under New York State's Abandoned Property Law, those royalties not being sent to their rightful owners would have to be surrendered to the state. Under a settlement, the labels were required to take measures to contact artists owed royalties.
- Payola Settlement: The office of Eliot Spitzer served subpoenas against record labels in an investigation into "payola," the illegal compensation of radio stations for playing certain songs. These subpoenas were related to allegations of deals for disc jockeys to receive gifts from promoters in exchange for playing the songs a certain number of times during the day. On July 25, 2005, Spitzer announced a settlement with Sony BMG Music Entertainment. In November 2005, a similar settlement was announced with Warner Music Group.

== Abortion ==
- In 2002, Spitzer's office issued subpoenas to 24 non-profit crisis pregnancy centers that sought to dissuade women from having abortions. Anti-abortion groups criticized Spitzer, charging that he was harassing the centers on behalf of a political ally, NARAL Pro-Choice America. Spitzer's office contended that the centers used deceptive advertising and were practicing medicine without a license. However, the subpoenas were subsequently withdrawn.

== Police corruption ==
- Town of Walkill (2001): Spitzer sued the town of Walkill in federal court, accusing the police department of petty corruption, civil liberties violations, and harassment. The town entered into an agreement with the state, dismissed the police chief, agreed to the appointment of an overseer and accepted a lengthy code of conduct laid out by the state. The police chief, James Coscette, had been appointed by Town supervisor Howard Mills and unanimously confirmed by the Town Board.

== Others ==
- United States Microsoft antitrust case (April 3, 2001):
