= C. Robert Henrikson =

Rob Henrikson
- Born: Carl Robert Henrikson; May 21, 1947 (age 79)
- Education: University of Pennsylvania (BA); Emory University (JD)
- Occupation: corporate executive

Carl "Rob" Robert Henrikson (born May 21, 1947) was the Chairman of the Board, president and chief executive officer of MetLife, Inc. Henrikson was appointed CEO on March 1, 2006 and Chairman of the Board on April 25, 2006. Henrikson was succeeded by Steven A. Kandarian as Chair, President and CEO of MetLife, Inc. in 2011.

Henrikson received a B.A. from the University of Pennsylvania in 1969 and a J.D. from Emory University School of Law in 1972. In addition, he is a graduate of the Wharton School's Advanced Management Program.He has testified at a number of congressional hearings on retirement, pension and employee benefits matters.

He is a board member of the American Council of Life Insurers, a board member of The Ron Brown Award for Corporate Leadership and a board member emeritus of the American Benefits Council. He also serves on the National Board of Advisors at the Morehouse School of Medicine, the board of directors of The New York Botanical Garden, and is a trustee of the American Museum of Natural History. He serves as chairman of the board of the S.S. Huebner Foundation for Insurance Education, and as a member of the Emory Law School Council and the Emory Campaign Steering Committee.

In 2006, he was honored with Emory Law School's Distinguished Alumni Award, and was elected to Emory's Board of Trustees as an Alumni Trustee in 2007. In 2024, he received the Emory Medal, the highest distinction awarded to Emory University alumni.
