= Ed Liddy =

American businessman (born 1946)

- Born: January 28, 1946 (age 79); New Brunswick, New Jersey, U.S.
- Education: B.A., Catholic University of America - 1968; MBA, George Washington University - 1972
- Known for: Clayton, Dubilier & Rice (2008, 2010-2015) - partner; AIG (2008-2009) - interim chairman & CEO; The Allstate Corp. (1994-2008), chairman and CEO (1999-2006); Sears, Roebuck & Co (1988-1994), CFO (1992-1994)
- Board member of: Abbott Laboratories, AbbVie Inc. and the Forum Club of Southwest Florida

Edward "Ed" Liddy (born January 28, 1946) is an American businessman who was chairman of the Allstate Corporation from 1999 to 2008.

In September 2008, at the request of the secretary of the U.S. Department of the Treasury, Liddy agreed to serve as interim chairman and chief executive officer of American International Group, Inc. (AIG). His placement in the role was one of numerous government actions to provide stability to U.S. financial firms during the 2008 financial crisis. Liddy requested a salary of just $1 a year.

== Early life ==
Liddy was born in New Brunswick, New Jersey. After the death of his father in 1959, he moved to Clearwater, Florida, with his mother and older sister. He was a member of the first graduating class of Clearwater Central Catholic High School in 1964. He earned his bachelor's degree from the Catholic University of America (1968) and MBA from George Washington University (1972).

== Career ==
Liddy began his career as a financial analyst with Ford Motor Company in 1972. He joined G.D. Searle & Co., and its CEO Donald Rumsfeld, in 1979, eventually becoming CFO. Upon the sale of Searle to Monsanto, he served from 1986 to 1988 as executive vice president and a member of the board of directors of ADT, Inc.

=== Sears, Roebuck and Co. ===
Upon the sale of ADT, Liddy joined Sears in April 1988 and served in a variety of financial and senior operating roles before being named chief financial officer in February 1992. In that role, he was the architect and implementer of the successful restructuring of Sears, which involved breaking the company into numerous public companies (Sears, The Allstate Corporation, Dean Witter) and selling non-core assets (Homart Development Company, Coldwell Banker Residential Broker, Sears Mortgage and Sears Savings Bank). He led the 1993 initial public offerings of Dean Witter/Discover and Allstate, two of the largest ever IPOs at that time. He also led the 1995 spinoff of Allstate from Sears.

=== The Allstate Corporation ===
After the IPO of Allstate, Liddy held positions of increasing responsibility with the Allstate Corporation, the largest publicly held personal lines property and casualty insurer in America, from 1994 to 2008. He served as chairman from January 1999 until his retirement in April 2008. He was chief executive officer from January 1999 until December 2006, and president and chief operating officer from August 1994 to December 1998. Under Liddy's leadership, the company was streamlined by exiting non-core businesses and the company expanded its distribution system beyond its traditional agency force to reach customers through the internet and call centers. During Liddy's tenure as president and then CEO, Allstate's market value more than tripled, from $11 billion (December 31, 1994) to over $40 billion (December 31, 2006).

=== American International Group ===
In September 2008, at the request of the Secretary of the U.S. Department of the Treasury, Liddy agreed to serve as interim chairman and chief executive officer of American International Group, Inc. (AIG). His placement in the role was one of numerous government actions to provide stability to U.S. financial firms during the 2008 financial crisis. He requested a salary of just $1 per year.

The restructuring of AIG that Liddy took on was one of the largest in U.S. corporate history. He and the AIG team developed a strategy to stabilize the company and its $1.2 trillion balance sheet; keep the company out of bankruptcy; repay with interest all money invested in the company by various U.S. government entities, which eventually totaled $182 billion; and keep the remaining business that would comprise AIG vital and competitive.

The government bailout of AIG garnered national headlines in May 2009 when AIG, with the concurrence of the U.S. Treasury and Federal Reserve, paid earned bonuses to employees of its Financial Products Business, determining the payments were contractual obligations. Liddy noted that "honoring contractual commitments is at the heart of what we do in the insurance business." At the same time, he urged the employees who received $165 million in bonuses to "do the right thing" and return at least part of their bonus.

Once the company was stabilized, a viable plan in place to repay the government assistance and a management team partially in place to execute the strategy, Liddy announced on May 21, 2009, he would resign as AIG chairman and CEO when replacements were found. He suggested the two roles be split. In August 2009, Robert Benmosche took over as CEO and Harvey Golub as chairman.

By December 2012, AIG had fully repaid the entire $182 billion, plus required interest, invested in the company by the government.

=== Clayton, Dubilier & Rice, LLC ===
Liddy served as a partner in the private equity investment firm Clayton, Dubilier & Rice, LLC from April to September 2008 and from January 2010 to December 2015.

=== Board of directors roles ===
Liddy serves on the board of directors of Abbott Laboratories, AbbVie Inc. and the Forum Club of Southwest Florida. He previously served on the board of directors of 3M Company and the Boeing Company.

== Philanthropy and civic engagement ==
Liddy has been actively involved in a number of philanthropic and civic endeavors. He serves as a life trustee for Northwestern University. He is also life trustee and chairman emeritus of Northwestern Memorial Hospital in Chicago, a life trustee of the Museum of Science and Industry in Chicago and a life trustee and former national chairman of the Boys & Girls Clubs of America. He served as chairman of the Civic Committee of the Commercial Club of Chicago as well as chairman of the club. He also served as chairman of the Executives Club of Chicago and Metropolitan Family Services.
