= Steven A. Kandarian =

American businessman

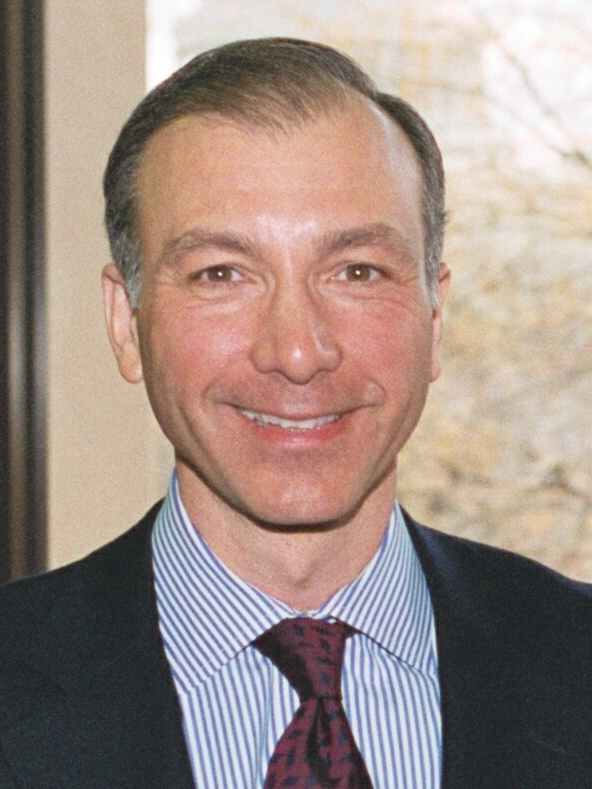
- Kandarian in 2001
- Born: Steven Albert Kandarian; March, 1952; West Hartford, Connecticut, US
- Education: Clark University; Georgetown University; Harvard University
- Known for: former President, Chairman, and CEO, MetLife

Steven A. Kandarian (born March, 1952) was the president, chairman, and chief executive officer of MetLife. He became president and CEO on May 1, 2011, and chairman in January 2012 succeeding Robert Henrikson, who retired from those roles. Kandarian retired from MetLife on April 30, 2019 and was succeeded as president and CEO by Michel Khalaf and as chairman by Glenn Hubbard.

== Life and career ==
Kandarian grew up in West Hartford, Connecticut, the son of Lillian and Albert Kandarian. He graduated from William H. Hall High School and held several roles in private equity, including as founder and managing partner of Orion Partners, LP and executive director of the Pension Benefit Guaranty Corporation. He is a board member of the Damon Runyon Cancer Research Foundation and a member of the Financial Services Forum and the Economic Club of New York. He received a B.A. from Clark University, a J.D. from Georgetown University Law Center, and an M.B.A. from Harvard Business School.

=== MetLife ===
Prior to becoming CEO, Kandarian was MetLife's chief investment officer since April 2005. As CIO, Kandarian oversaw a number of initiatives that strengthened MetLife's investment portfolio, enhanced the company's focus on effective risk management and contributed to the bottom line. He is credited with preparing MetLife's portfolio prior to the 2007 recession, partly by anticipating the housing bubble and selling Stuyvesant Town—Peter Cooper Village in Manhattan in 2006.

In his first three months as CEO, Kandarian expanded the company's senior leadership team with the hiring of Frans Hijkoop to head human resources and Martin Lippert to oversee global technology. He also announced MetLife's 25-year agreement to acquire the naming rights to the home of the New York Giants and New York Jets, which is now known as MetLife Stadium.

In addition, Kandarian has also moved the company away from retail banking. On July 21, 2011, MetLife said the company would seek to sell its deposit banking business. In announcing the move, Kandarian said it "was not appropriate for the overwhelming majority of our business to be governed by regulations written for banking institutions." Three months later, MetLife said it would look to sell its residential mortgage lending business as well, saying the marketplace and regulatory environment for the business was uncertain and that the company needed to focus its resources on its global insurance and employee benefits businesses.

=== Pension Benefit Guaranty Corporation ===
Kandarian is a former executive director of the Pension Benefit Guaranty Corporation, an agency of the United States Government. Kandarian was appointed to head the PBGC on December 2, 2001, by Secretary of Labor Elaine L. Chao, announcing his departure on January 7, 2004. to return to his family in Boston. He left on February 13, 2004.
