= Costis Maglaras =

Greek engineer and academic administrator

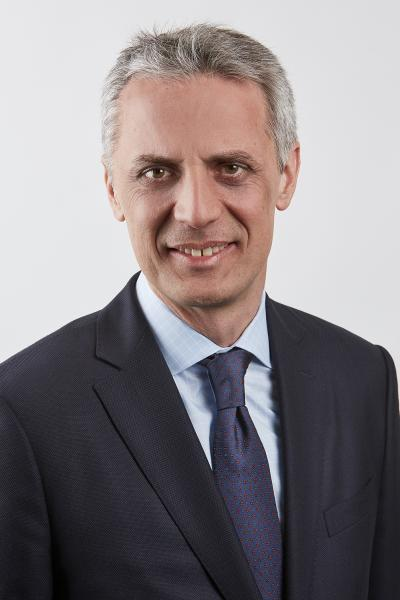

16th Dean of Columbia Business School
- Incumbent
- Assumed office July 1, 2019
- Preceded by: Glenn Hubbard

Personal details
- Born: December 18, 1969 (age 56) Athens, Greece
- Education: Imperial College London (BSc); Stanford University (MS, PhD)

Costis Maglaras (Greek: Κωστής Μαγκλάρας; born December 18, 1969) is a Greek engineer and academic administrator. He is currently serving as the Dean and David and Lyn Silfen Professor of Business at Columbia Business School.

== Early life and education ==
Maglaras was born in Athens, Greece, went to Athens College, and then moved to Imperial College London where he graduated with a Bachelor of Science in electrical engineering in 1990. He then moved to Stanford University for his Master of Science and Ph.D. also in electrical engineering. Upon graduation he moved to Columbia Business School, where he has been since 1998.

== Career ==
=== Research ===
Early work focused on the control of stochastic networks – motivated by manufacturing operations and communication networks. His doctoral dissertation work was awarded first place in the INFORMS George Nicholson Student Paper Competition in 1999.

Later on he worked on aspects of congestion pricing in information services, such as bandwidth provision and service differentiation, for which he won the INFORMS Section Prize in 2008, and on algorithmic pricing, such as the one encountered in retailing, airlines and hotels.

=== Academic ===
Maglaras joined Columbia Business School in 1998, received tenure in 2006, was promoted to full professor in 2008 and was named the David Lyn Silfen Professor of Business in 2009. He was Chair of the Decision Risk and Operations division from 2015-2018, member of the executive committee of Columbia University’s Data Science Institute, Director of the Business Schools PhD program from 2011 to 2017. He was elected to the 2019 class of Fellows of the Institute for Operations Research and the Management Sciences. Maglaras is a fellow of the Foreign Policy Association and received an award from the organization in 2020.

In June 2019, Columbia University President, Lee Bollinger, announced that Maglaras had been selected as the 16th Dean of Columbia Business School. Maglaras took office on July 1, 2019, succeeding economist Glenn Hubbard.

=== Industry ===
In 2007, Maglaras helped found Mismi Inc., a financial technology firm based in New York City focusing on quantitative trading in the equities market. From 2007 to 2014, he served as Mismi's head of research.
