= Balance (2013 book) =

Balance: The Economics of Great Powers
- First edition
- Authors: Tim Kane R. Glenn Hubbard
- Language: English
- Genre: Economic History
- Publisher: Simon and Schuster
- Publication date: May 20, 2014
- Publication place: United States
- Pages: 368 pp
- ISBN: 9781476700267

Balance: The Economics of Great Powers from Ancient Rome to Modern America, known colloquially as Balance is a non-fiction economic history text written by former US intelligence officer and economist Captain Tim Kane and economist Glenn Hubbard. While criticized for its brevity across a wide range of historical matters, it has become an often cited text in the debate around American Isolationism and fiscal policy.

== Summary ==
The text's principal concern is why economic imbalances have historically caused civil collapse, and asks whether The United States could experience a similar decline. The book summarizes the fall of a range of civilizations, including the Ming Dynasty, Ottoman Turkey and Imperial Spain, and reflects on the resulting patterns within their socioeconomic, military and political policies.

From this, Kane and Hubbard introduce a new measure of economic power, based around fiscal balance, national debt and social spending. The text is particularly critical of heavy regulation on internal employment, markets and trade, highlighting the limits of the Japanese model of growth, including an ageing population. The book concludes with a comparison of the twenty-first century United States to former fallen civilizations, and the challenges Americans face in order to address what Kane and Hubbard regard as "dysfunctional fiscal imbalance".

== Reception ==
The book received mixed to positive reviews during the initial release, with The New York Times describing the book's analysis of imperial history as "one-dimensional" but praising the book's overall focus on domestic issues as "dead-on". The Financial Times described the book as "a readable, data-rich history of the fall of great powers through the eyes of two fiscally troubled US conservatives in 2013."

The book has found success in political debate circles, and is often cited within other socioeconomic texts and analysis.
