= Glenn Hubbard (economist) =

American economist (born 1958)

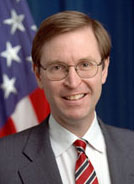

15th Dean of Columbia Business School
- In office July 1, 2004 – July 1, 2019
- Preceded by: Meyer Feldberg
- Succeeded by: Costis Maglaras

20th Chair of the Council of Economic Advisers
- In office May 11, 2001 – February 28, 2003
- President: George W. Bush
- Preceded by: Martin Baily
- Succeeded by: Greg Mankiw

Personal details
- Born: Robert Glenn Hubbard; September 4, 1958 (age 68) Orlando, Florida, U.S.
- Party: Republican
- Education: University of Central Florida (BA, BS); Harvard University (MA, PhD)
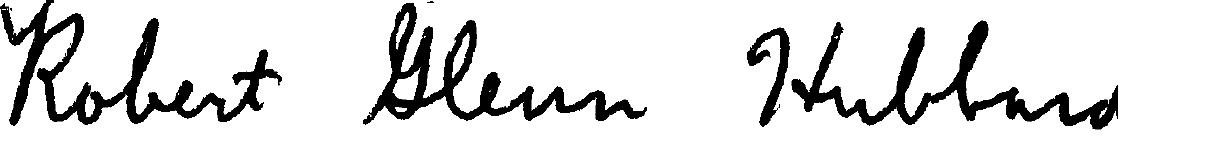
- Signature
- Website: Official website

Academic background
- Doctoral advisor: Benjamin M. Friedman; Jerry A. Hausman; Martin Feldstein

Academic work
- Discipline: Public economics Corporate finance Financial institutions Macroeconomics; Industrial organization Natural resource economics Public policy
- School or tradition: Supply-side economics
- Website: Information at IDEAS / RePEc

Robert Glenn Hubbard (born September 4, 1958) is an American economist. He was the dean of Columbia Business School from 2004 to 2019, and remains the Russell L. Carson Professor of Finance and Economics there. Hubbard previously served as Deputy Assistant Secretary at the U.S. Department of the Treasury from 1991 to 1993, and as Chairman of the Council of Economic Advisers from 2001 to 2003.

Hubbard is a visiting scholar at American Enterprise Institute, where he studies tax policy and health care. He was criticized for his reports and papers on deregulation during the 2008 financial crisis. He was also heavily criticized in the documentary Inside Job about the credit default swap scams that led to the 2008 financial crisis.

== Early life and education ==
Born September 4, 1958, Hubbard was raised in Apopka, Florida, a suburb of Orlando, Florida. His father taught at a local community college and his mother taught at a high school. Hubbard's younger brother, Gregg, is a member of the country-pop band Sawyer Brown.

Hubbard is an Eagle Scout. A member of the chess team, he graduated at the top of his class. He scored well enough on his College Level Examination Program to enter the University of Central Florida with enough credits to graduate with two degrees in three years. He obtained his B.A. and B.S. degrees summa cum laude from the University of Central Florida in 1979, and his masters and PhD in economics from Harvard University in 1983.

== Career ==
=== Academic ===
Hubbard has been at Columbia University since 1988, being Russell L. Carson Professor of Finance and Economics since 1994.

He was named Dean of Columbia Business School on July 1, 2004. During his tenure, the construction of the 11-story Henry R. Kravis Hall was launched. In September 2018, it was reported that Hubbard would be stepping down from his role as Dean at the end of the 2018–19 academic year.

=== Government ===
Hubbard was Deputy Assistant Secretary at the U.S. Department of the Treasury from 1991 to 1993.

From February 2001 until March 2003, Hubbard was chairman of the Council of Economic Advisors under President George W. Bush. A supply-side economist, he was instrumental in the design of the 2003 Bush Tax cuts.

He was tipped by some media outlets to be a candidate for the position of Chairman of the Federal Reserve when Alan Greenspan retired, although he was not nominated for the position.

=== Political advisor ===
Hubbard served as economic advisor to the 2012 presidential campaign of Mitt Romney, a position he also held during Romney's 2008 presidential campaign. In August 2012, Politico identified Hubbard as "a likely Romney appointee as Federal Reserve chairman or Treasury secretary".

Hubbard was an economic advisor for the Jeb Bush 2016 presidential campaign. After Donald Trump became the presumptive Republican nominee, Hubbard was mentioned as a potential Treasury secretary (which eventually went to Steven Mnuchin), and also as a potential Fed chair (which eventually went to Jerome Powell). Hubbard had been critical of both Trump and Democratic presidential candidate Hillary Clinton, including after Bush had suspended his campaign. In August 2016, Hubbard declined to say which candidate he supported in the general election, but did say that Trump's taxation plans and their impact on economic growth were in a "direction" somewhat better than Clinton's plans. Hubbard criticized Trump's plans on trade and immigration for their predicted economic impact.

=== Other ===
Hubbard serves as co-chair of the Committee on Capital Markets Regulation.

Hubbard is a member of the Board of Directors of Automatic Data Processing, Inc., BlackRock Closed-End Funds, Capmark Financial Corporation, Duke Realty Corporation, KKR Financial Corporation, The TIFIN Group LLC and Ripplewood Holdings. He is also a Director or Trustee of the Economic Club of New York, Tax Foundation, Resources for the Future, Manhattan Council and Fifth Avenue Presbyterian Church, New York, and a member of the Advisory Board of the National Center on Addiction and Substance Abuse... Director of MetLife and Metropolitan Life Insurance Company since February 2007.

Hubbard is currently a board member of:

- Automatic Data Processing
- Duke Realty
- Ripplewood Holdings
- MetLife Inc.
- FiscalNote

On January 8, 2019, he was appointed to become MetLife's non-executive chairman of the board as of May 1, 2019, upon the retirement of Steven A. Kandarian.

=== Inside Job interview and aftermath ===
Hubbard was interviewed in Charles Ferguson's Oscar-winning documentary film, Inside Job (2010), discussing his advocacy, as chief economic advisor to the Bush administration, of deregulation. Ferguson argues that deregulation led to the 2008 financial crisis sparked by the bankruptcy of Lehman Brothers and the sale of Merrill Lynch. In the interview, Ferguson asks Hubbard to enumerate the firms from whom he receives outside income as an advisory board member in the context of possible conflict of interest. Hubbard, hitherto cooperative, declines to answer and threatens to end the interview with the remark, "You have three more minutes; give it your best shot." After the release of the film, Columbia ramped up ongoing efforts to strengthen and clarify their conflict of interest disclosure requirements.

== Books ==
Hubbard is the author of a number of economic and socioeconomic texts, with a focus on deregulation, conservative fiscal policy and taxation. In 2009, he wrote and published The Aid Trap with economist William Duggan Columbia University Press, criticizing the aid system provided by NGOs in western countries as preventing internal growth in poorer nations. In 2013, he published Balance with former intelligence officer and economist Tim Kane.

== Columbia Business School (CBS) Follies ==
Hubbard is also frequently featured in skits by Columbia Business School's "Follies" group, ranging from videos of him monitoring students on classroom video cameras to songs about his relationship with presidential candidate Mitt Romney. Hubbard has also publicized his dissatisfaction with Ben Bernanke's nomination as Chair of the Federal Reserve with his comedic YouTube parody of The Police's "Every Breath You Take", titled "Every Breath Bernanke Takes".

Political offices
Preceded by Martin Baily	Chair of the Council of Economic Advisers; 2001–2003	Succeeded by Greg Mankiw
Academic offices
Preceded by Meyer Feldberg	Dean of Columbia Business School; 2004–2019	Succeeded by Costis Maglaras
