= Bob Benmosche =

American businessman

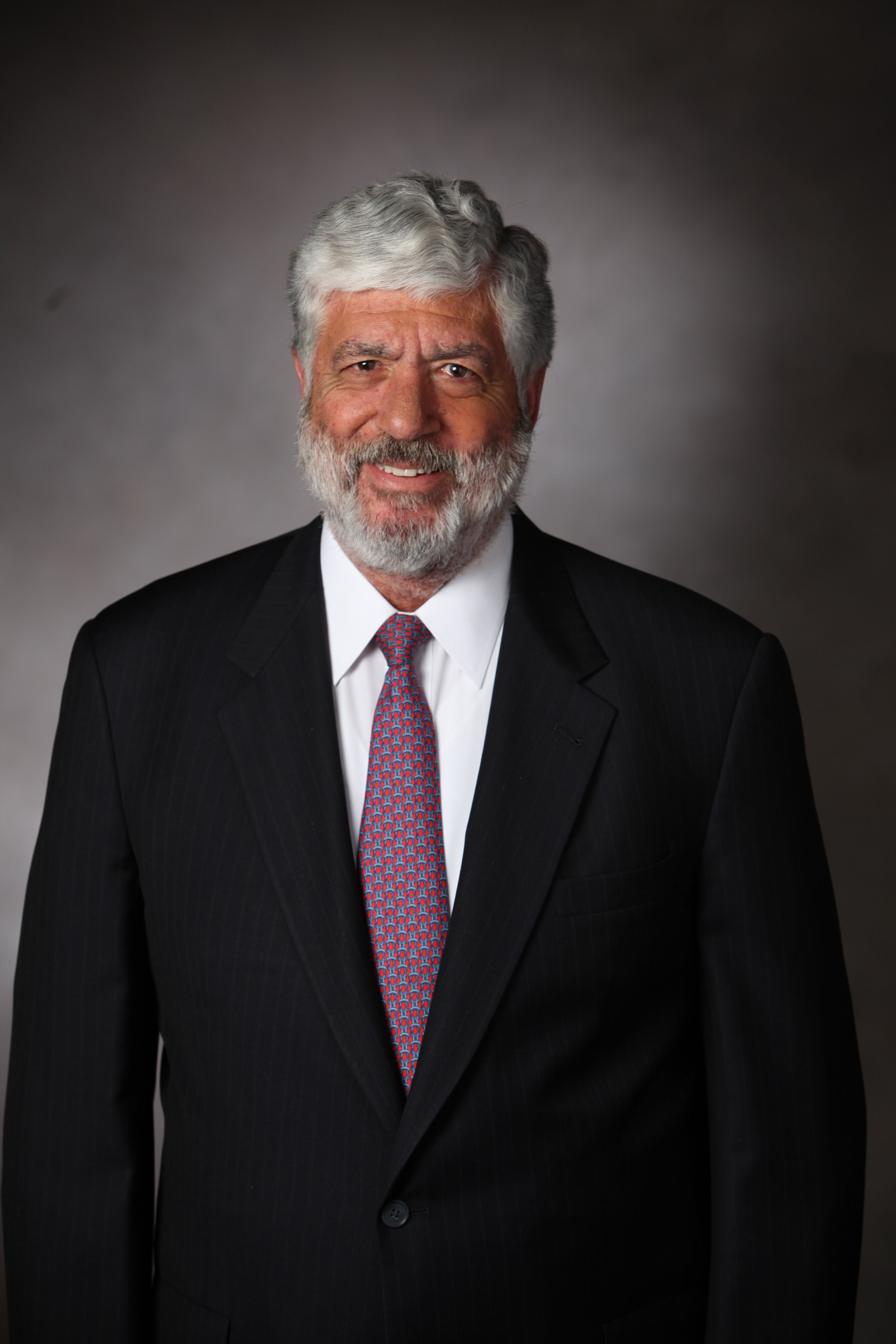
- Benmosche c. 2012
- Born: Robert Herman Benmosche; May 29, 1944; Brooklyn, New York, U.S.
- Died: February 27, 2015 (aged 70); New York City, U.S.
- Education: B.A. 1966
- Alma mater: Alfred University
- Occupation: CEO
- Employer: AIG
- Title: President/CEO of American International Group
- Term: August 2009 – August 2014
- Predecessor: Edward M. Liddy
- Political party: Libertarian
- Spouse: Denise Benmosche
- Children: 2

Robert Herman Benmosche (/bɛnmoʊˈʃeɪ/ ben-moh-SHAY, May 29, 1944 – February 27, 2015) was the president and chief executive officer of American International Group (NYSE: AIG). He was appointed President & Chief Executive Officer by the US Department of Treasury and AIG Board of Directors to succeed Edward M. Liddy. Benmosche is known for his leadership at AIG, where he led a turnaround and paid down government aid pledged by the Bush and Obama Administrations.

== Early life ==
Benmosche was born in Brooklyn, New York. Benmosche traced his Jewish lineage back to Lithuania, where his great-grandfather, Moshe Kreiskol, was one of the first Jews to serve in the tsar's army in the 1830s. Benmosche's grandfather, Rabbi Herman Benmosche moved the family to the US in 1894.

Benmosche's father died when Benmosche was 10 years old. His estate included a newly constructed motel in the Borscht Belt—the small towns in the Catskills where New York City Jews summered; and $250,000 debt. The family kept the motel. Benmosche himself took a series of jobs, working there, caddying, and later, driving a delivery truck. He graduated from New York Military Academy in 1962, and from Alfred University in 1966 with a Bachelor of Arts degree in Mathematics. From 1966 to 1968, Benmosche served as a lieutenant in the U.S. Army, serving a tour of duty in Korea in the U.S. Signal Corps where he led the setup of field communications.

== Career ==
Benmosche began his career when he joined Arthur D. Little and Information Science as a consultant. In 1975, Benmosche joined the Chase Manhattan systems group. In 1982, Benmosche joined Paine Webber to lead the development of Paine Webber's Central Asset Brokerage Account. During his 14-year tenure at Paine Webber, Benmosche gained experience in marketing and operations in different business units, using the knowledge he gained to become Chief Financial Officer of the company's retail business. As his career progressed at Paine Webber, Benmosche continued to gain new responsibilities, eventually earning a promotion to the position of executive vice president and director of operations, administration and technology. In that role, he oversaw the merger of Kidder Peabody's operations and systems with those of Paine Webber.

=== MetLife ===
Benmosche left Paine Webber to join the Metropolitan Life Insurance Company in 1995. He was later promoted to president and chief operating officer, and in November 1997 in his role as COO, oversaw individual and institutional as well as international insurance operations. In 1998 he was named chairman of the board and CEO. He retired in 2006. During his tenure, he oversaw MetLife's successful transition from mutual company to publicly traded firm.

After being a member of the board of Credit Suisse AG for eleven years, Benmosche retired in April 2013.

=== Lafayette Theatre ===
In 2001, Benmosche purchased the 1923 Lafayette Theatre in his hometown of Suffern, New York, and led its preservation effort.

=== Innkeeper and vintner ===
Benmosche owned Villa Splendid in Dubrovnik, Croatia. In 2001, Benmosche bought the one-time discothèque and spent the next six years renovating it. In 2006, Benmosche purchased land and imported 1500 Zinfandel plants from Napa Valley, California. In 2011, Benmosche's vineyard produced 3,000 bottles of wine under The Benmosche Family Dingac label.

=== AIG turnaround ===
In mid-2009, Benmosche was appointed CEO of American International Group. He assumed that role on August 10 of that year. He was recruited by Jim Millstein who was Chief Restructuring Officer at the US Department of Treasury.

During his first meeting with employees, Benmosche stated that Congress was composed of "crazies", that he would not cooperate if asked to testify before Congress, and that New York Attorney General Andrew Cuomo, who had investigated AIG, "doesn't deserve to be in government". He later asked for a personal private jet and said that he might quit over government-imposed pay restrictions.

In 2010, Benmosche testified to the Congressional Troubled Asset Relief Program (TARP) Oversight Panel, on May 26, that AIG would repay the U.S. Government and American taxpayers’ investment in AIG in full, with a profit. "AIG is now on a clear path to repaying taxpayers ... At the end of the day, the U.S. government will make an appropriate profit," he testified.

Benmosche oversaw the sale of non-core assets in AIG's portfolio to pay down the $182 billion in government aid. Business units such as American Life Insurance Company (Alico), American General Finance, 21st Century Insurance, Nan Shan and AIA were sold.

On December 14, 2012, Benmosche announced that the U.S. government and American taxpayers received their full investment in AIG, plus a $22 billion positive return. Benmosche's management has been credited with leading the company back to profitability, the full repayment to the Federal Reserve Bank of New York, reducing the Treasury Department's stake in AIG to below 20% and the repayment of the 2008 $85 billion federal loan.

=== Illness ===
In 2010, Benmosche was diagnosed with lung cancer. He continued to work while also undergoing an aggressive oral chemotherapy regime.

In an interview with Charlie Rose in December 2012, Benmosche said that he would stay at his current position for two more years. In August 2014, he accelerated the timetable of his retirement from AIG due to the progression of his cancer. Peter Hancock took over the role of CEO on September 1, 2014. Benmosche died on February 27, 2015, in Manhattan, aged 70.

=== Controversy over bonuses ===
In September 2013, Benmosche gave an interview to The Wall Street Journal in which he compared public outrage over AIG bonuses to the lynching of African-Americans in the Deep South, saying "the uproar was intended to stir public anger, to get everybody out there with their pitch forks and their hangman nooses, and all that – sort of like what we did in the Deep South [decades ago]. And I think it was just as bad and just as wrong."

This was seen as a reference to the $165 million in bonuses paid out in March 2009 to employees of AIG's "financial products" division, which sold the credit derivatives that put AIG deeply in debt after the Lehman Brothers collapse and compelled the Federal Reserve to bail out AIG with an $85 billion loan six months earlier, that eventually ballooned to $182.7 billion. His comments were labeled insensitive, offensive and tasteless by a number of commentators, with Congressman Elijah Cummings calling for him to resign.

Following the public outrage over the comments and Cummings' call, Benmosche apologized for the remarks two weeks later.

== Honors ==
- Insurance and Technology magazine identified Benmosche as one of the insurance industry's "Tech-Savvy CEOs" in 2010.
- Benmosche ranked 42nd in Fortune magazine's Top 50 Business Leaders of 2010.
- The New York Times DealBook Andrew Ross Sorkin named Benmosche “2010 Executive of the Year”.
- Benmosche ranked #59 of Top 100 CEOs by Harvard Business Review, January 2010.
- Insurance and Technology magazine named Benmosche 2011 “Mover and Shaker”.
- The New York Police & Fire Widows’ & Children's Benefit Fund named Benmosche as an honoree in 2012.
- 2013 winner Insurance Hall of Fame

== Works ==
- Benmosche, Bob (2016). Good for the Money: My Fight to Pay Back America. with Peter Marks and Valerie Hendy. Macmillan: St. Martin's Press. ISBN 978-1250072184.

Business positions
Preceded by Edward M. Liddy	CEO of AIG; 2009–2014	Succeeded by Peter Hancock
