= Alico =

Alico may refer to:

- Alico Arena, an athletics facility at Florida Gulf Coast University donated by
- Alico (company)
- ALICO Building, in Waco, Texas
- American Life Insurance Company, now part of MetLife
- Platani (river), a river in Sicily
