= Peter Hancock (businessman) =

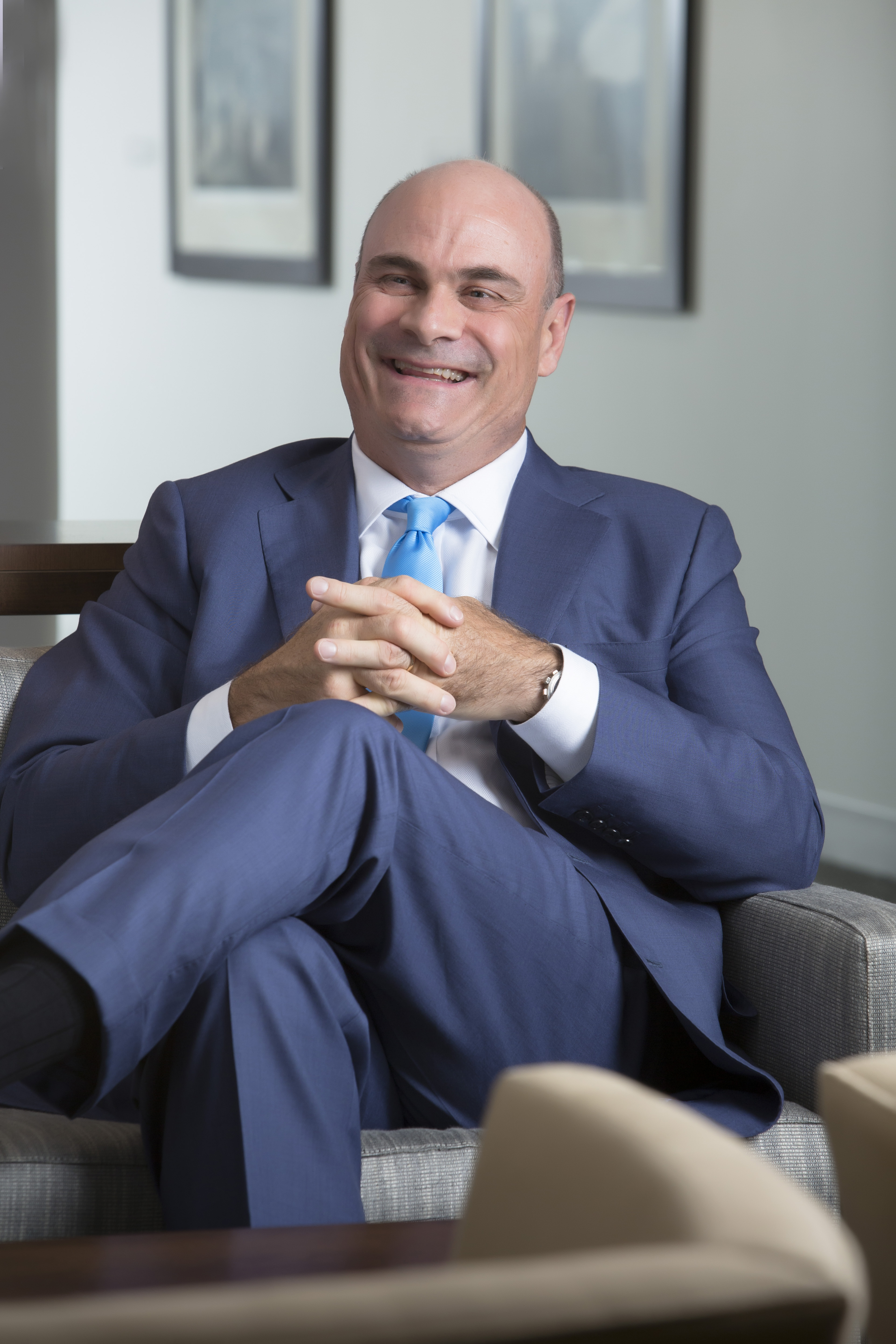

Peter D. Hancock is a British business executive, and a former president and chief executive officer (CEO) of AIG. He resigned in March 2017.

== Biography ==
Hancock was born in London, but raised in Hong Kong. He returned to the UK to attend Oxford University, where he received a B.A. in Politics, Philosophy, and Economics.

== Career ==
Hancock has spent his entire career in financial services, including 20 years at J.P. Morgan, where he founded the global derivatives group in 1991. He left J.P. Morgan in 2000 after working as both chief financial officer and chief risk officer when the company merged with Chase Manhattan Bank. He then started a financial advisory firm, Trinsum, with other J.P. Morgan alumni, before being recruited by KeyCorp during the 2008 financial crisis, where he became vice-chairman.

In 2010, at the recommendation of officials at PricewaterhouseCoopers and the Federal Reserve Bank of New York, Hancock was hired on as executive vice-president of finance, risk and investments at AIG by the then-CEO, Bob Benmosche.

Hancock was CEO of AIG from September 2014 to March 2017. AIG paid $67.3 million to its CEOs in 2017, with part of the payment going to Hancock who resigned under pressure from activist investors as his turnaround plan suffered setbacks.

In March 2021, Hancock joined the board of directors of Ledger Investing.

== Honors ==
Hancock is a member of the board of the Japan Society, as well as a member of the International Advisory Board of British American Business. He is also a William Pitt Fellow of Pembroke College, Cambridge.

Business positions
Preceded by Robert H. Benmosche	CEO of AIG; 2014 – 2017	Succeeded by Brian Duperreault
