= American International Group =

American multinational finance and insurance corporation

American International Group, Inc.

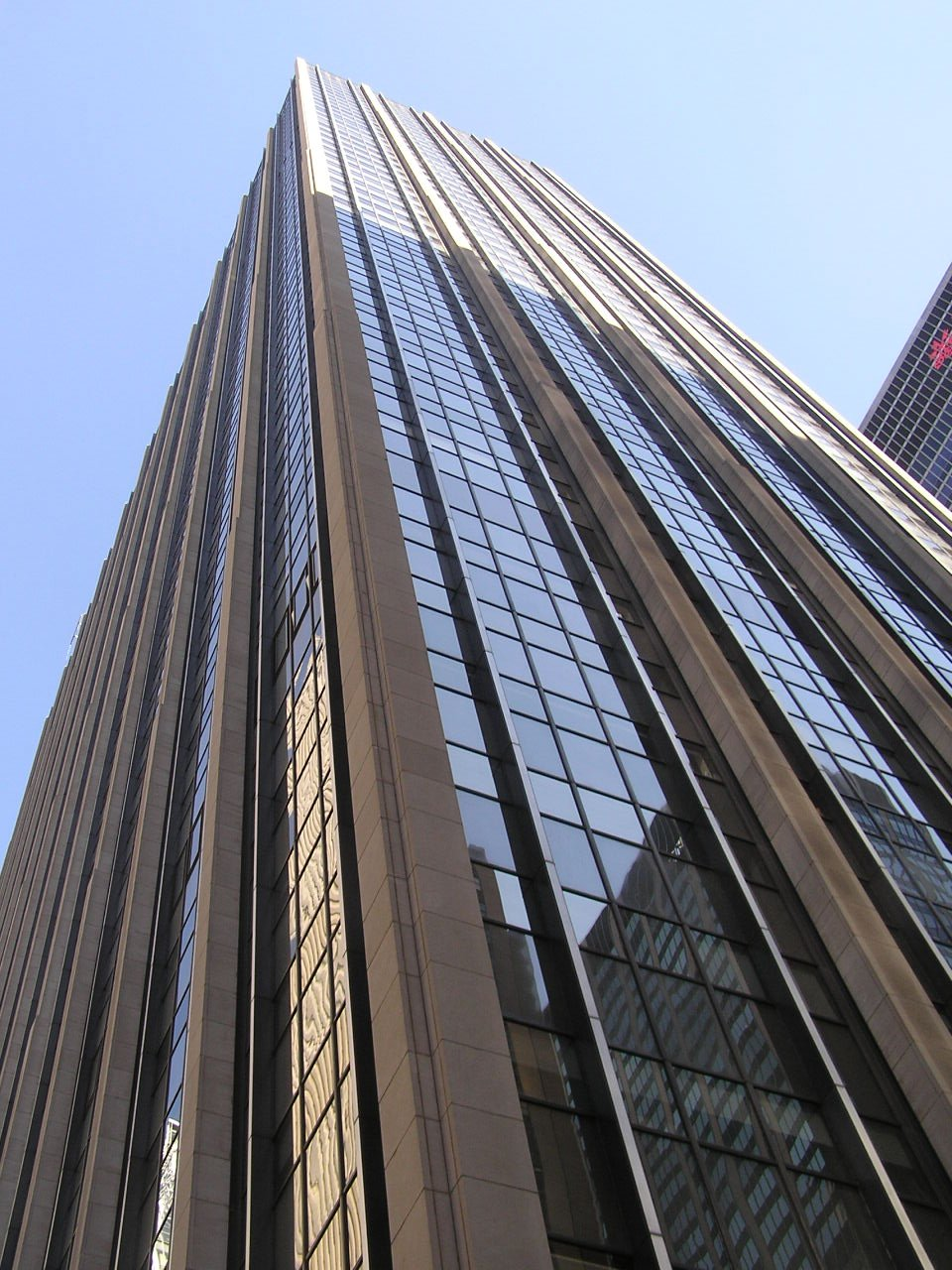
- AIG headquarters, 1271 Avenue of the Americas, New York
- Type: Public
- Traded as: NYSE: AIG; S&P 500 component
- Industry: Financial services
- Founded: December 19, 1919; 106 years ago in Shanghai, China
- Founder: Cornelius Vander Starr
- Headquarters: 1271 Avenue of the Americas, New York City, U.S.
- Area served: Worldwide
- Key people: Eric Andersen (President and CEO)
- Products: General insurance; Casualty insurance; Property insurance; Cyber insurance; Liability insurance; Accident insurance; Health insurance; Travel insurance; Vehicle insurance
- Revenue: ▼US$26.77 billion (2025)
- Operating income: ▲US$3.879 billion (2025)
- Net income: ▲US$3.096 billion (2025)
- Total assets: ▼US$161.2 billion (2025)
- Total equity: ▼US$41.14 billion (2025)
- Number of employees: 22,100 (2025)
- Website: aig.com

American International Group, Inc. (AIG) is a global insurer headquartered in New York City, with operations in more than 200 countries and jurisdictions. Founded in 1919, the company primarily provides commercial and personal insurance products, including property and casualty insurance, liability coverage, accident and health insurance, and specialty insurance products. The company also provides risk management, multinational, and related insurance services to businesses and individuals.

During the 2008 financial crisis, AIG received a $180 billion bailout from the United States Federal Reserve, which assumed a controlling ownership stake in the company. The Financial Crisis Inquiry Commission attributed AIG's failure to the mass sales of unhedged insurance. AIG subsequently underwent a major restructuring, and by 2012, repaid the United States government $205 billion.

AIG has served as the title sponsor of the AIG Women’s Open golf championship since 2019. The company was included on Forbes’ lists of the World Top Companies for Women in 2025 and America’s Best Companies in 2026.

== History ==
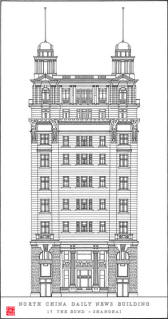
North China Daily News Building on the Bund, Shanghai (elevation): the original home of what became AIG; now the AIA building.

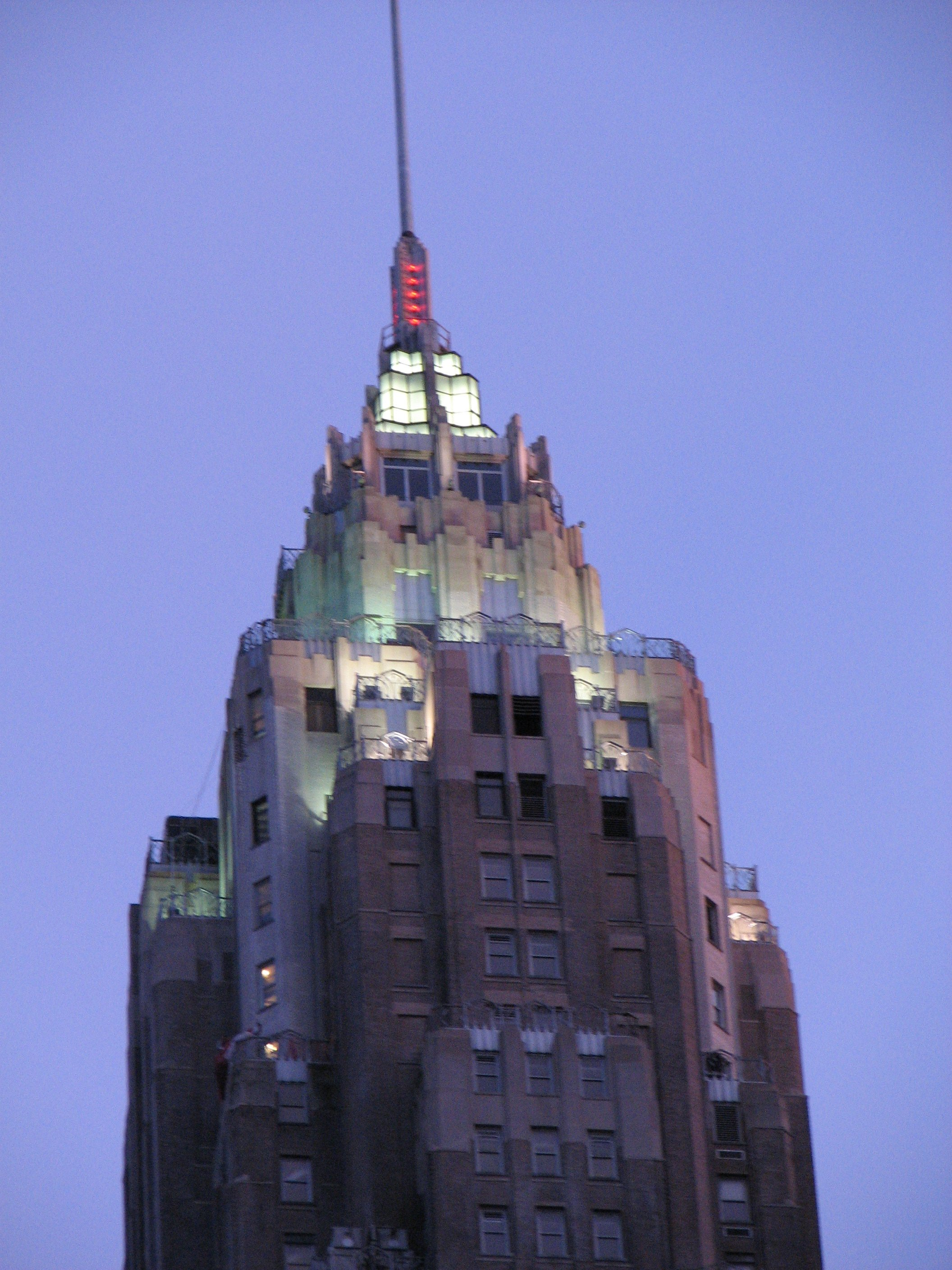
70 Pine Street was known as the American International Building.

=== 1919–1945: early years ===
AIG was founded December 19, 1919 when American Cornelius Vander Starr (1892–1968) established a general insurance agency, American Asiatic Underwriters (AAU), in Shanghai, China. By the late 1920s, AAU had branches throughout China and Southeast Asia. In 1926, Starr opened his first office in the United States, American International Underwriters Corporation (AIU). He also focused on opportunities in Latin America and, in the late 1930s, AIU entered Havana, Cuba. The steady growth of the Latin American agencies proved significant as it would offset the decline in business from Asia due to the impending World War II. In 1939, Starr moved his headquarters from Shanghai to New York City.

=== 1945–1959: international and domestic expansion ===
After World War II, American International Underwriters (AIU) entered Japan and Germany to provide insurance for American military personnel. Throughout the late 1940s and early 1950s, AIU continued to expand in Europe, with offices opening in France, Italy, and the United Kingdom. In 1952, Starr began to focus on the American market by acquiring Globe & Rutgers Fire Insurance Company and its subsidiary, American Home Fire Assurance Company. By the end of the decade, C.V. Starr's general and life insurance organization included an extensive network of agents and offices in over 75 countries.

=== 1959–1979: reorganization and specialization ===
In 1960, C.V. Starr hired Hank Greenberg to develop an international accident and health business. Two years later, Greenberg reorganized one of C.V. Starr's U.S. holdings into a successful multiple line carrier. Greenberg focused on selling insurance through independent brokers rather than agents to eliminate agent salaries. Using brokers, AIU could price insurance according to its potential return even if it suffered decreased sales of certain products for great lengths of time with very little extra expense. In 1968, Starr named Greenberg his successor. The company went public in 1969.

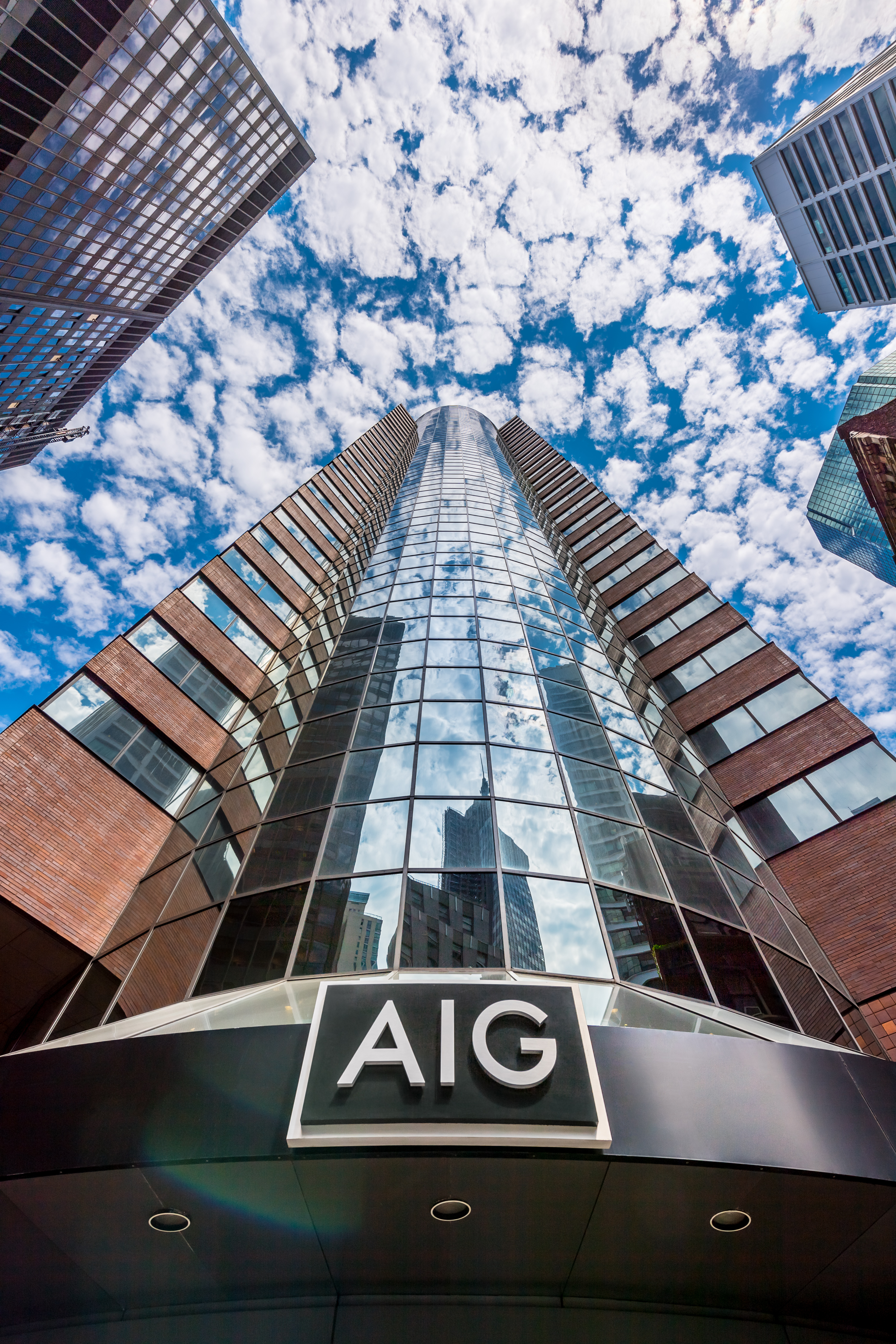
Former AIG Headquarters in New York

The 1970s presented many challenges for AIG as operations in the Middle East and Southeast Asia were curtailed or ceased altogether due to the changing political landscape. However, AIG continued to expand its markets by introducing specialized energy, transportation, and shipping products to serve the needs of niche industries.

=== 1979–2000: new opportunities and directions ===
During the 1980s, AIG continued expanding its market distribution and worldwide network by offering a wide range of specialized products, including pollution liability and political risk. AIG was still characterized as a holding company in the financial press. There continued to be an ongoing trend within the industry for insurers to offer coverage through different but interrelated groups, something that could be especially beneficial when it came to consolidating and managing effective insurance underwriting practices, which were the underpinning of any successful insurance business. In 1983, a spokesman for AIG criticized other companies for "sloppy underwriting", saying those companies did not fully comprehend the policies they were offering and often were mostly interested in writing policies quickly to bring in premiums in order to fund the investment side of their business, without regard for the risks being taken. In 1984, AIG listed its shares on the New York Stock Exchange (NYSE).

Throughout the 1990s, AIG developed new sources of income through diverse investments, including the acquisition of International Lease Finance Corporation (ILFC), a provider of leased aircraft to the airline industry. In 1992, AIG received the first foreign insurance license granted in over 40 years by the Chinese government. Within the U.S., AIG acquired SunAmerica Inc. a retirement savings company managed by Eli Broad, in 1999.

=== 2000–2012: further expansion and decline ===
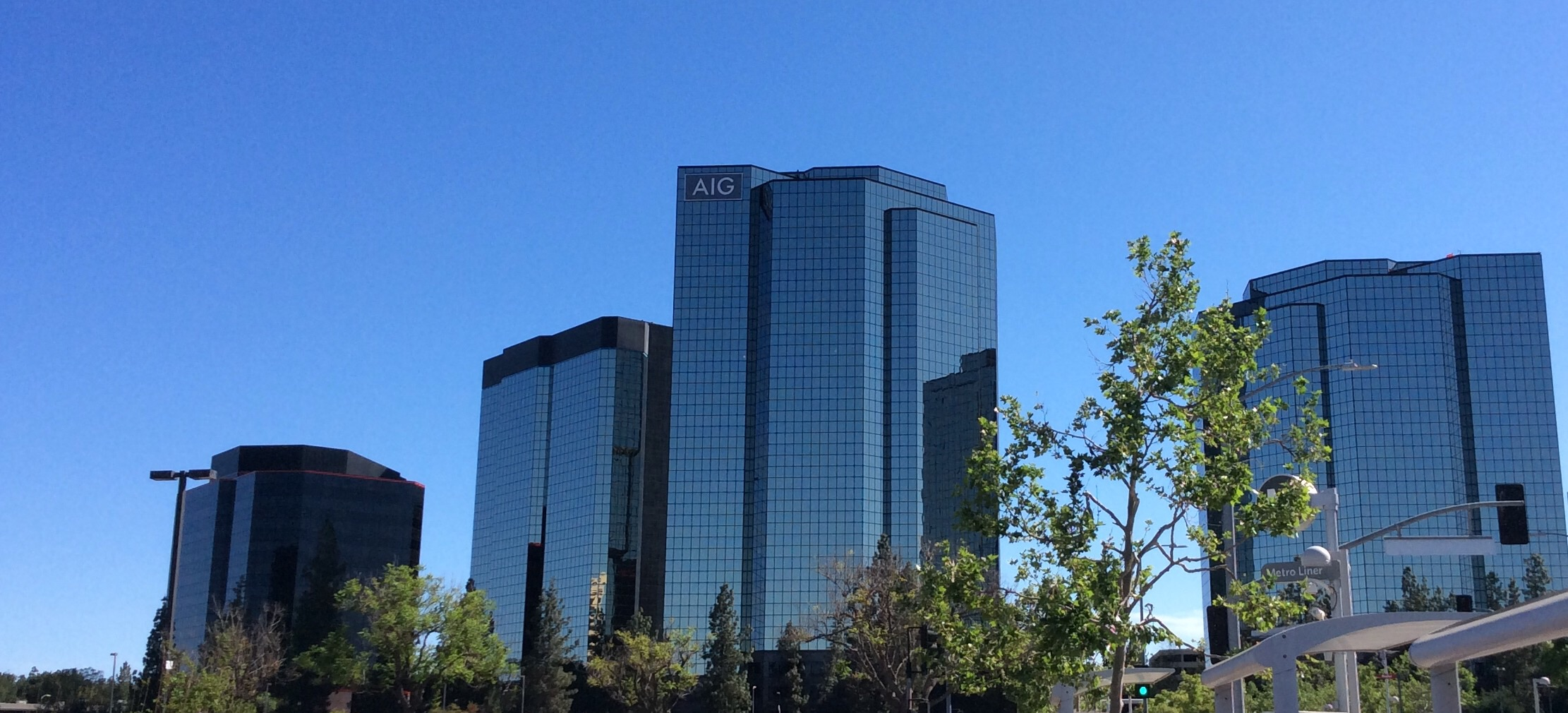
The AIG Towers of Woodland Hills, Los Angeles.

==== Growth ====
The early 2000s saw a marked period of growth as AIG acquired American General Corporation, a leading domestic life insurance and annuities provider, and AIG entered new markets including India. In February 2000, AIG created a strategic advisory venture team with the Blackstone Group and Kissinger Associates "to provide financial advisory services to corporations seeking high level independent strategic advice". AIG was an investor in Blackstone from 1998 to March 2012, when it sold all of its shares in the company. Blackstone acted as an adviser for AIG during the 2008 financial crisis.

In March 2003 American General merged with Old Line Life Insurance Company.

In the early 2000s, AIG made significant investments in Russia as the country recovered from the 1998 Russian financial crisis. In July 2003, Maurice Greenberg met with Putin to discuss AIG's investments and improving U.S.-Russia economic ties, in anticipation of Putin's meeting with U.S. President George W. Bush later that year."

In November 2004, AIG reached a $126 million (~$206 million in 2025) settlement with the U.S. Securities and Exchange Commission and the Justice Department partly resolving a number of regulatory matters, and the company needed to continue to cooperate with investigators continuing to probe the sale of a non-traditional insurance product.

==== Accounting investigations ====
In 2005, AIG was involved in a series of fraud investigations conducted by the Securities and Exchange Commission, U.S. Justice Department, and New York State Attorney General's Office. Greenberg was ousted amid the investigations in February 2005. The New York Attorney General's investigation led to a $1.6 billion fine for AIG and fraud and conspiracy charges for some of its executives.

On May 1, 2005, investigations conducted by outside counsel at the request of AIG's Audit Committee and the consultation with AIG's independent auditors, PricewaterhouseCoopers LLP resulted in AIG's decision to restate its financial statements for the years ended December 31, 2003, 2002, 2001 and 2000, the quarters ended March 31, June 30 and September 30, 2004, and 2003 and the quarter ended December 31, 2003. On November 9, 2005, the company was said to have delayed its third-quarter earnings report because it had to restate earlier financial results to correct accounting errors.

==== Expansion to the credit default insurance market ====
Martin J. Sullivan became CEO of the company in 2005. He began his career at AIG as a clerk in its London office in 1970. AIG then took on tens of billions of dollars of risk associated with mortgages. It insured tens of billions of dollars of derivatives against default, but did not purchase reinsurance to hedge that risk. Secondly, it used collateral on deposit to buy mortgage-backed securities. When losses hit the mortgage market in 2007–2008, AIG paid out insurance claims and replaced the losses in its collateral accounts.

AIG purchased the remaining 39% that it did not own of online auto insurance specialist 21st Century Insurance in 2007 for $749 million. With the failure of the parent company and the continuing recession in late 2008, AIG rebranded its insurance unit to 21st Century Insurance.

On June 11, 2008, three stockholders, collectively owning 4% of the outstanding stock of AIG, delivered a letter to the Board of Directors of AIG seeking to oust CEO Martin Sullivan and make certain other management and Board of Directors changes.

On June 15, 2008, after disclosure of financial losses and subsequent to a falling stock price, Sullivan resigned and was replaced by Robert B. Willumstad, Chairman of the AIG Board of Directors since 2006. Willumstad was forced by the US government to step down and was replaced by Ed Liddy on September 17, 2008. AIG's board of directors named Bob Benmosche CEO on August 3, 2009, to replace Liddy, who earlier in the year announced his retirement.

==== 2008 liquidity crisis and government bailout ====
During the 2008 financial crisis, the United States federal government bailed out AIG for $180 billion, and assumed control to protect the financial integrity of other major firms that were its trading partners, including Goldman Sachs, Morgan Stanley, Bank of America and Merrill Lynch, as well as dozens of European banks. In January 2011, the Financial Crisis Inquiry Commission issued a report stating that AIG was bailed out by the government because of its sales of credit default swaps were made without putting up the initial collateral, setting aside capital reserves, or hedging its exposure. Other analysts believed AIG's liquidity crisis occurred because of the sweeping deregulation of over-the-counter (OTC) derivatives, including credit default swaps, which effectively eliminated federal and state regulation of these products, including capital and margin requirements.

AIG had sold credit protection through its London unit in the form of credit default swaps (CDSs) on collateralized debt obligations (CDOs) but by 2008, they had declined in value. AIG's Financial Products division, headed by Joseph Cassano in London, had entered into credit default swaps to insure $441 billion worth of securities originally rated AAA. Of those securities, $57.8 billion were structured debt securities backed by subprime loans. As a result, AIG's credit rating was downgraded and it was required to post additional collateral with its trading counter-parties, leading to a liquidity crisis that began on September 16, 2008, and essentially bankrupted all of AIG. The New York United States Federal Reserve Bank (led by Timothy Geithner who would later become Treasury secretary) stepped in, announcing creation of a secured credit facility, initially of up to $85 billion to prevent the company's collapse, enabling AIG to deliver additional collateral to its credit default swap trading partners. The credit facility was secured by the stock in AIG-owned subsidiaries in the form of warrants for a 79.9% equity stake in the company and the right to suspend dividends to previously issued common and preferred stock. The AIG board accepted the terms of the Federal Reserve rescue package that same day, making it the largest government bailout of a private company in U.S. history.

In March 2009, AIG compounded public cynicism concerning the "too big to fail" firm's bailout by announcing that it would pay its executives over $165 million in executive bonuses.

AIG began selling some assets to pay off its government loans in September 2008 despite a global decline in the valuation of insurance businesses, and the weakening financial condition of potential bidders. In December 2009, AIG formed international life insurance subsidiaries, American International Assurance Company, Limited (AIA) and American Life Insurance Company (ALICO), which were transferred to the Federal Reserve Bank of New York, to reduce its debt by $25 billion. AIG sold its Hartford Steam Boiler unit on March 31, 2009, to Munich Re for $742 million. On April 16, 2009, AIG announced plans to sell its 21st Century Insurance subsidiary to Farmers Insurance Group for $1.9 billion. In June 2009 AIG sold its majority ownership of reinsurer Transatlantic Re. The Wall Street Journal reported on September 7, 2009, that Pacific Century Group had agreed to pay $500 million for a part of AIG's asset management business, and that they also expected to pay an additional $200 million to AIG in carried interest and other payments linked to future performance of the business.

AIG then sold its American Life Insurance Co. (ALICO) to MetLife Inc. for $15.5 billion in cash and MetLife stock in March 2010. Bloomberg L.P. reported on March 29, 2010, that after almost three months of delays, AIG had completed the $500 million sale of a portion of its asset management business, branded PineBridge Investments, to the Asia-based Pacific Century Group. Fortress Investment Group purchased 80% of the interest in financing company American General Finance in August 2010. In September 2010 AIG sold AIG Starr and AIG Edison, two of its Japan-based companies, to Prudential Financial for $4.2 billion in cash and $600 million in assumption of third party AIG debt by Prudential. On November 1, 2010, AIG raised $36.71 billion from both the sale of ALICO and its IPO of AIA. Proceeds went to repay some of the aid it received from the government during the 2008 financial crisis.

AIG sold its Taiwanese life insurance company Nan Shan Life to a consortium of buyers for $2.16 billion in January 2011. Due to the Q3 2011 net loss widening, on November 3, 2011, AIG shares plunged 49 percent year to date. The insurer's board approved a share buyback of as much as $1 billion.

Nine years after the initial bailout, in 2017, the U.S. Financial Stability Oversight Council removed AIG from its list of too-big-to-fail institutions.

=== 2012–2016 ===
The United States Department of the Treasury announced an offering of 188.5 million shares of AIG for a total of $5.8 billion on May 7, 2012. The sale reduced Treasury's stake in AIG to 61 percent, from 70 percent before the transaction. Four months later, on September 6, 2012, AIG sold $2 billion of its investment in AIA to repay government loans. The board also approved a $5 billion stock repurchase of government-owned shares in AIA. The next week, on September 14, 2012, the Department of Treasury completed its fifth sale of AIG common stock, with proceeds of approximately $20.7 billion, reducing the Treasury's ownership stake in AIG to approximately 15.9 percent from 53 percent. Government commitments were fully recovered, and Treasury and the FRBNY to date had received a combined positive return of approximately $15.1 billion.

On October 12, 2012, AIG announced a five and a half year agreement to sponsor six New Zealand–based rugby teams, including the world champion All Blacks. The AIG logo and the Adidas logo, the league's primary sponsor, were displayed on the league's team jerseys.

The U.S. Department of the Treasury in December 2012 published an itemized list of the loans, stock purchases, special purpose vehicles (SPVs) and other investments engaged in with AIG, the amount AIG paid back and the positive return on the loans and investments to the government. The U.S. Treasury and the Federal Reserve Bank of New York provided a combined $182.3 billion in financial assistance to AIG. AIG repaid $205 billion, resulting in a $22.7 billion profit for the government. In addition, AIG sold off a number of its own assets to raise money to pay back the government. On December 14, 2012, the Treasury Department sold the last of its AIG stock in its sixth stock sale for a total of approximately $7.6 billion. In total, the Treasury Department realized a gain of more than $22 billion from the sale of AIG common stock and $0.9 billion from the sale of AIG preferred stock. The same month, Robert Benmosche announced that he would be stepping down from his position as president and CEO due to his advancing lung cancer.

AIG began an advertising campaign on January 1, 2013, called "Thank You America", in which several company employees, including AIG President and CEO Robert Benmosche, talked directly to the camera and offered their thanks for the government assistance. Peter Hancock succeeded Benmosche as president and CEO of AIG in September 2014. While Benmosche stayed on in an advisory role, he died in February the following year.

In June 2015, Taiwan's Nan Shan Life Insurance acquired a stake in AIG's subsidiary in Taiwan for a fee of $158 million. Later that year, activist investor Carl Icahn called for a breakup of AIG, describing the company as "too big to succeed". AIG announced plans for an initial public offering of 19.9 percent of United Guaranty Corp., a Greensboro, North Carolina–based provider of mortgage insurance for lenders in January 2016. Later that year, Icahn won a seat on the board of directors and continued to pressure the company to split up its major divisions. AIG also began a joint venture with Hamilton Insurance Group and Two Sigma Investments to serve the insurance needs of small- to medium-sized enterprises. Industry veteran Brian Duperreault became the chairman of the new entity, and Richard Friesenhahn, the executive vice president of U.S. casualty lines at AIG, became CEO. In August 2016, AIG sold off United Guaranty, its mortgage-guarantee unit, to Arch Capital Group, a Bermuda-based insurer, for $3.4 billion.

=== 2017 ===
Brian Duperreault was appointed CEO of AIG on May 15, 2017. Duperreault, who previously worked at AIG from 1973 until 1994, was hired as CEO from Hamilton Insurance Group following Hancock's announcement in March 2017 that he would step down as AIG CEO under pressure after a period of disappointing financial results. Due to previous calls in 2015 and 2016 to shrink or break up AIG, Duperreault announced his intention to grow AIG and maintain its multiline structure as a provider of life and retirement solutions and non-life insurance, outlining a strategy to focus on technology, "underwriting discipline", and diversification.

2017 through early 2019 saw AIG hire a number of new upper level executives. In 2017, Duperreault named Peter Zaffino as AIG COO, later also naming him CEO of AIG's General Insurance business. Zaffino succeeded Duperreault as president of AIG in January 2020, with Duperreault remaining AIG's CEO. The company announced plans in 2017 to reorganize its Commercial and Consumer segments into General Insurance and Life & Retirement, respectively. In September 2017, the Financial Stability Oversight Council determined that AIG was no longer considered a nonbank systemically important financial institution (SIFI). Duperreault commented in response that the development reflected "the progress made since 2008 to de-risk the company."

=== 2018–2023 ===
AIG made a number of acquisitions in 2018. That July, AIG acquired Validus Holdings Ltd., a provider of reinsurance based in Bermuda. The company was also a Lloyd's of London syndicate, involved in insurance-linked securities, a specialist in US small commercial excess and surplus underwriting, and a provider of crop insurance. The deal "brought in fresh underwriting talent", particularly in property risk and catastrophe risk. Also in 2018 AIG acquired Ellipse, a UK life insurance business, from Munich Re. In 2018, AIG established Fortitude Re to hold most of its run-off portfolios and late in 2018 sold a minority stake to The Carlyle Group. In November 2019, a Carlyle-managed fund and T&D Holdings acquired a majority interest in Fortitude Re, leaving AIG with a 3.5% stake "subject to required regulatory approvals and other customary closing conditions."

Duperreault and Zaffino set out a turnaround strategy for the General Insurance business in 2017 and began execution. In 2019, Duperreault stated that the new executive team had restructured the business, implemented new risk and underwriting guidelines, and "overhauled its reinsurance buying strategy."

In 2019, the company announced "AIG 200", a multi-year program to improve operations by shedding legacy processes and excess manual interventions, modernizing and digitizing workflows, and unifying operations. Also during that month, AIG reported its second consecutive quarter of underwriting profits, and AIG's Life and Retirement business, led by CEO Kevin Hogan, delivered "solid growth" and returns despite a volatile credit and equity market. In January 2020, AIG announced it was ending its decade-long sponsorship of the All Blacks in 2021.

On March 1, 2021, Peter Zaffino succeeded Brian Duperreault as AIG's CEO, with Duperreault becoming executive chairman of the board. Then, in January 2022, Zaffino also became chairman of the AIG board.

As part of AIG's 2020 plan to spin off its life and retirement insurance business with a 2022 IPO, the company announced, in July 2021, that Blackstone Group would acquire 9.9% of the new unit for $2.2 billion cash. Blackstone and AIG also entered a long-term asset management agreement for about one quarter of AIG's life and retirement portfolio, set to increase in subsequent years. After the spin-off, Corebridge Financial became an independent entity, raising $1.68 billion in the largest U.S. IPO of 2022.

In February 2023, AIG and Stone Point Capital entered into an agreement to establish an independent managing general agency and relocate AIG's current private client group to the independent new company, Private Client Select Insurance Services (PCS). That May, AIG agreed to sell subsidiary Crop Risk Services to American Financial Group for $240 million, as well as Validus Re, including AlphaCat and the Talbot Treaty reinsurance business, to RenaissanceRe for $2.985 billion, in cash and RenaissanceRe common shares.

=== 2024–present ===
In March 2024, British regulators cleared the sale of the UK arm of AIG Life Ltd to British insurer Aviva for £460 million.

In June 2024, AIG deconsolidated Corebridge after waiving its right to majority representation on the company’s board while retaining an ownership stake of 48.4%. AIG continued to sell shares of Corebridge throughout 2024, including completing the sale of approximately 120 million shares to Nippon Life Insurance Company in December for $3.8 billion. In May 2026, AIG agreed to sell its remaining approximately 25 million shares of Corebridge for about $710 million, completing its divestment from the company.

In 2025, AIG expanded its use of generative artificial intelligence in its underwriting and claims operations, including through partnerships with technology companies Anthropic and Palantir.

In January 2026, AIG announced that Eric Andersen would succeed Peter Zaffino as CEO. Andersen joined the company as president and CEO-elect in February 2026, and the transition was completed on 1 June 2026. Andersen also joined AIG's board of directors, and Zaffino transitioned to the role of executive chair. In September 2026, Zaffino transitioned from AIG’s board of directors and became a senior advisor to the company.

== Sponsorships ==
AIG was the shirt sponsor of the English football club Manchester United F.C. between 2006 and 2010. AIG was the first American shirt sponsor of the club and AIG shirts were worn for one of the most concentrated periods of success in the club's history, coinciding with Alex Ferguson's Manchester United team winning three Premier League titles, as well as the Champions League, in the space of four seasons.

In 2019, AIG signed a five-year contract to be the title sponsor of the Women's British Open, its first deal in golf. In 2020, the contract was extended to 2025 and the championship was rebranded as the AIG Women's Open, with the largest major women's golf prize fund in 2021, totaling $US5.8 million. The AIG Women's Open set a new benchmark in 2022 of $7.3 million for women's major championship golf prize payouts, increasing the tournament's purse 125% since 2018. In 2023, AIG announced it will continue as the title sponsor of the event through 2030, along with another increase in the total purse to $9 million.

In 2025, AIG became a strategic investor and commercial partner of Salford City F.C., an English Football League (EFL) League Two club. In 2026, AIG agreed in principle to become the largest minority equity investor in the club’s women’s team, the Salford City Lionesses, which would make it the first Fortune 500 company to take an ownership stake in a UK women’s football club. The expanded partnership also made AIG the front-of-shirt sponsor for the men’s and women’s teams and granted the company naming rights to Moor Lane, which was renamed AIG Stadium.

== Subsidiaries ==
- AIG Europe S.A.
- American Home Assurance Company
- Lexington Insurance Company
- National Union Fire Insurance Company of Pittsburgh, PA
- American International Group UK Ltd.
- AIG General Insurance Co. Ltd.
- AIG Asia Pacific Insurance Pte. Ltd.
- Talbot Underwriting Ltd.
- Western World Insurance Company
- Glatfelter Insurance Company

== AIG bailout litigation ==
- Starr International Co v U.S. Federal Circuit Court of Appeals

Maurice ("Hank") Greenberg, with lead lawyer David Boies, independently sued the U.S. Government for US$40 billion in the United States Court of Federal Claims in 2011. In Starr v. United States, the plaintiffs argued that the government denied AIG access to discounted federal loans that would have enabled the company to pay off creditors; instead, AIG was forced to pay a high interest rate and hand the government an 80 percent equity stake in the company. The AIG board had announced on January 9 that the company would not join the lawsuit.

The trial judge was Thomas C. Wheeler. In his opening, David Boies called the United States' demand for a 79.9% equity stake a "grab" at "an extortion rate." In response, government lawyer Kenneth Dintzer sought to paint Greenberg and the A.I.G. shareholders as ingrates with a sense of "entitlement" that "knows no bounds." The trial lasted thirty-seven days and included testimony from former chairman of the Federal Reserve Ben Bernanke, and former Secretaries of the Treasury Timothy Geithner, Henry Paulson. Banker Jimmy Lee testified that AIG had no hope of obtaining private financing. Former secretary Paulson testified that the terms of the bailout were meant to be punitive. John J. Studzinski testified that he advised the AIG Board when it decided to accept the bailout. After closing arguments by Boies and Dintzer, Judge Thomas C. Wheeler ruled that the terms of the Federal Reserve loan to AIG had been an illegal exaction, as the Federal Reserve Act did not authorize the New York Fed to nationalize a corporation by owning its stock. Judge Wheeler did not award compensation to the plaintiffs, ruling that they did not suffer economic damage because "if the government had done nothing, the shareholders would have been left with 100 percent of nothing."

Greenberg and the U.S. Government appealed to the Court of Appeals for the Federal Circuit, which ruled that Greenberg had no legal right to challenge the bailout because that right belonged to AIG, which had chosen not to sue.

- AIG Inc. et al. v. Maiden Lane II LLC

AIG filed suit against the Federal Reserve Bank of New York in January 2013 to maintain the former's right to sue Bank of America and other issuers of bad mortgage debt. The specific issue was whether the Federal Reserve Bank of New York transferred $18 billion in litigation claims on troubled mortgage debt through Maiden Lane Transactions, entities created by the Fed in 2008. This transaction, AIG argued, prevented them from recouping losses from insured banks. Owing to events which allowed AIG to proceed in another related case, AIG Inc. v. Bank of America Corporation LLC, AIG withdrew the Maiden Lane case "without prejudice" on May 28, 2013.

- AIG Inc. v. Bank of America Corporation LLC

On May 7, 2013, Los Angeles U.S. District Judge Mariana Pfaelzer ruled in a case between AIG and Bank of America concerning possible misrepresentations by Merrill Lynch and Countrywide as to the quality of the mortgage portfolio, that $7.3 billion of the disputed claims had not been assigned. The two parties settled in July 2014, with Bank of America paying out $650 million to AIG, which in turn dismissed their litigation.

== Corporate governance ==
=== Board of directors ===
As of July 2026, the AIG board includes:

- Eric Andersen – president and CEO, AIG
- James Cole Jr. – chairman and CEO, The Jasco Group
- John Chris Inglis – senior strategic advisor, Paladin Capital Group
- Courtney Leimkuhler – founder and managing partner, Springbank
- Linda A. Mills – former vice president of operations, Northrop Grumman Corporation
- Diana M. Murphy – managing director, Rocksolid Holdings; former president, USGA
- Juan R. Perez – chief information officer advisor, Salesforce
- Peter R. Porrino – former executive vice president and CFO, XL Group Ltd
- John G. Rice – chairman, AIG board of directors; former vice chairman, GE; former president and CEO, GE Global Growth Organization
- Thomas D. Stoddard – former vice chairman of Global Investment Banking, Bank of America
- Vanessa A. Wittman – former CFO, Glossier, Dropbox, Marsh McLennan

== See also ==
- Bailout
- 2008 financial crisis
- List of United States insurance companies
