= Robert Gerling =

German insurance businessman (1878–1935)

- Born: Robert Wilhelm Gerling; 13 August 1878; Elberfeld, Rhine Province, Kingdom of Prussia (now Wuppertal, Germany)
- Died: 25 January 1935 (aged 56); St. Moritz, Switzerland
- Occupations: Businessman, insurance executive
- Known for: Founding and leading Gerling-Konzern
- Spouse: Auguste Hoffmeister (m. 1907)
- Children: 3, including Hans
- Relatives: Rolf Gerling (grandson)

Robert Wilhelm Gerling (13 August 1878 - 25 January 1935) was a German insurance executive and businessman who founded the Gerling-Konzern, of the largest insurance providers in Germany in 1904. He was the patriarch of the Gerling family of Cologne, Germany.

== Early life and education ==
Gerling was born 13 August 1878 in Elberfeld (today part of Wuppertal), the fourth of six children, to Robert Gerling Sr. (1847–1934), a commercial representative for his fathers button factory, and Anna Gerling (née Fromm; 1850–1938). After school he completed a 3-year apprenticeship as insurance agent with C. Mihr & Co., which owners were friends of his fathers.

== Career ==
After briefly working for C. Mihr & Co., he joined Mannheimer Versicherungsgesellschaft (Mannheim Insurance Company) in 1896. He founded the Gerling-Konzern on 7 May 1904.

== Personal life ==
On 11 July 1907, Gerling married Auguste Hoffmeister (1879–1964), who was the daughter of a penitentiary director in Cologne. They had three sons;

- Robert Gerling Jr. (born 1914)
- Hans Gerling (1915–1991), married, one son Rolf Gerling (born 1954), who was the majority owner of Gerling-Konzern until 2005 (sold to Talanx)
- Walter Gerling (24 October 1918 - 9 March 2019), insurance executive and philanthropist.

He died on 25 January 1935 in St. Moritz, Switzerland. His last residence was Villa Marienburg in Cologne.

== Literature ==
- Peter Koch: Gerling, Robert Wilhelm. In: Neue Deutsche Biographie (NDB). Band 6, Duncker & Humblot, Berlin 1964, ISBN 3-428-00187-7, S. 308 f. (Digitalisat) (in German)
- Ders.: Robert Gerling (1878–1935), in: Rheinisch-Westfälische Wirtschaftsbiographien, Band 9, Münster 1967, S. 133–150 (in German)
