= Leo Goodwin =

Leo Goodwin may refer to:

- Leo Goodwin Sr. (1886–1971), founder of GEICO
- Leo Goodwin Jr. (died 1978), businessman
- Leo Goodwin (swimmer) (1883–1957), American swimmer and gold medalist
