= Rolf Gerling =

German businessman (born 1954)

- Born: 15 December 1954 (age 71); Cologne, West Germany
- Education: University of Zurich
- Occupations: Businessman, investor, philanthropist, environmentalist
- Known for: Owning and leading Gerling-Konzern; Philanthropy
- Spouse: Katharina Gerling
- Children: 1
- Father: Hans Gerling

Rolf Gerling (born 15 December 1954) is a German billionaire businessman, philanthropist, investor and heir to the Gerling-Konzern. His net worth is estimated at $2.3 billion (2024) by Forbes magazine.

== Early life and education ==
Gerling was born 15 December 1954 in Cologne, West Germany, one of three children, to Hans Gerling, then the largest insurance provider in Germany through Gerling-Konzern, and Irene "Inge" Gerling (née Uhrmacher; died 1990), an interior designer and gallery owner. Gerling was educated at the Montessori school followed by Schiller-Gymnasium in Cologne. After completing his Abitur he completed an internship at Vereins- und Westbank Hamburg followed Economics studies at University of Zurich from 1974 to 1979 (Licentiate). In 1986, he completed his doctorate.

== Career ==
Gerling has been employed with his family firm since 1989. He inherited a 94% stake in Gerling-Konzern from his father Hans Gerling, valued at US$1.6 billion in 1992. Gerling Konzern is one of the world's largest writers of reinsurance policies. Gerling managed the firm until he sold his stake in 2005 to the Talanx Group.

Today, Gerling primarily is a private investor and environmentalist. His portfolio includes real estate through companies like DufourIm AG. He also operates the charitable Fondazione Gerling where he resides in Ticino, Switzerland.

== Private ==
Gerling is married to Katharina Gerling, a German Canadian dual citizen, and resides in Tegna, Switzerland. He has one daughter.
