= Insurance Hall of Fame =

American hall of fame for the international insurance field

The Insurance Hall of Fame, occasionally referred to as the International Insurance Hall of Fame, honors exceptional members of the insurance field. It was created in 1957 and is administered by the global nonprofit International Insurance Society (IIS), which was founded in 1965 and is based in New York City.

The Insurance Hall of Fame's museum and portrait gallery at the University of Alabama houses a collection of portraits and memorabilia of the laureates. A multimedia collection of laureate portraits, videos, and biographies are also housed in a gallery at St. John's University in New York City.

== Qualification ==
To qualify for inclusion in the Insurance Hall of Fame, nominees must be adjudged to have made a lasting contribution to the insurance industry. They also may have shown creative thinking and imaginative actions – starting trends, discovering new products or methods, or uncovering and resolving problems.

Nominees for the Insurance Hall of Fame are submitted by the IIS membership and evaluated for selection by the IIS Honors Committee, a body of senior insurance executives and academics. The nominees are then voted on by the IIS membership by secret ballot, which is tabulated and conducted by an independent auditing firm.

== History ==
The Insurance Hall of Fame was conceived and organized in 1957 by John S. Bickley, who was then professor of insurance at Ohio State University. It was sponsored by the Griffith Foundation for Insurance Education, which had its headquarters on the OSU campus. The Griffith Foundation for Insurance Education is a nonprofit educational corporation founded in 1947 at Ohio State University in memory of a young Columbus, Ohio insurance agent, Charles W. Griffith, who was killed in World War II; the foundation was affiliated with OSU until 1992.

Bickley, who continued to spearhead the Insurance Hall of Fame as its Chairman, later moved to the University of Texas, and then to the University of Alabama, where he had started his academic career.

In 1965 the Insurance Hall of Fame became international, appointing electors from 32 countries and voting on candidates from anywhere in the world. That year Bickley founded the International Insurance Society (IIS), based in New York City, as a forum where people involved in insurance could share their ideas and interests. The IIS encourages networking, academic pursuits, and education; it sponsors annual meetings, and funds research projects and awards. A committee of insurance industry leaders at IIS annually elects the inductees to the Insurance Hall of Fame – those who have made notable contributions to the insurance industry worldwide. As of 2019 the IIS includes electors from over 90 countries.

In 1987 the Insurance Hall of Fame's museum and portrait gallery moved to the University of Alabama, where Bickley taught. Space at the New York City-based International Insurance Society is too limited to display any but the current year's inductees. By 2010 the museum in Alabama had drawn over 250,000 visitors. The facility includes a portrait gallery of inductees through the years, a museum of insurance, and a lecture hall.

In 2003 an additional gallery was opened at St. John's University in New York City, which hosts a multimedia collection of laureate portraits, videos, and biographies. In 2004 the Insurance Hall of Fame launched its website, with lists and profiles of all inductees since its inception.

== Insurance Hall of Fame laureates ==
Data is from Insurance Hall of Fame Laureates by Year of Induction.

=== 1950s ===
==== 1957 ====
- Elizur Wright - USA
- Solomon S. Huebner - USA
- Benjamin Franklin - USA

==== 1958 ====
- Charles Evans Hughes - USA
- Ralph H. Blanchard - USA

==== 1959 ====
- Frederick H. Ecker - USA
- Albert F. Dean - USA

=== 1960s ===
==== 1960 ====
- M. Albert Linton - USA
- John A. Diemand, Sr. - USA

==== 1961 ====
- Clarence Arthur Kulp - USA
- Louis I. Dublin - USA

==== 1962 ====
- John Marshall Holcombe, Jr. - USA
- Alfred M. Best - USA

==== 1963 ====
- Julian S. Myrick - USA
- Sheppard Homans - USA

==== 1964 ====
- William Leslie, Sr. - USA

==== 1965 ====
- Ernst Froelich - Switzerland
- Haley Fiske - USA
- James Dodson - United Kingdom
- Johan DeWitt - Netherlands
- James G. Batterson - USA
- Nicholas Barbon - United Kingdom

==== 1966 ====
- Alfred Manes - Germany
- Holgar J. Johnson - USA
- Cuthbert Eden Heath - United Kingdom

==== 1967 ====
- William David Winter - USA
- Georges Tattevin - France
- Edmond Halley - United Kingdom
- Alfred N. Guertin - USA
- Leighton Foster - Canada

==== 1968 ====
- Arthur Hunter - USA
- Joseph Arnould - India
- Zachariah Allen - USA

==== 1969 ====
- Charles J. Zimmerman - USA
- Harry J. Loman - USA
- Max E. Eisenring - Switzerland

=== 1970s ===
==== 1970 ====
- Tsuneta Yano - Japan
- James Scott Kemper, Sr. - USA
- Kenkichi Kagami - Japan
- Hendon Chubb - USA
- John Julius Angerstein - United Kingdom

==== 1971 ====
- John F. Dryden - USA
- Paul F. Clark - USA
- Alois Alzheimer - Germany

==== 1972 ====
- David McCahan - USA
- Walter Arnold Dinsdale - United Kingdom

==== 1973 ====
- Maurice Picard - France
- Albert Henry Mowbray - USA

==== 1974 ====
- Richard Price - United Kingdom
- Cecil Edward Golding - United Kingdom
- Harald Cramer - Sweden
- Eugenio Artom - Italy

==== 1975 ====
- Cornelius V. Starr - USA
- Murray D. Lincoln - USA
- J. Roger Hull - USA
- Jacques Basyn - Belgium

==== 1976 ====
- Otto von Bismarck - Germany
- Edwin W. Patterson - USA
- Gen Hirose - Japan

==== 1978 ====
- Taizo Abe - Japan

==== 1979 ====
- Herbert W. Heinrich - USA
- Henry S. Beers - USA

=== 1980s ===
==== 1980 ====
- Joseph B. Maclean - USA
- Andre Besson - France

==== 1981 ====
- Antigono Donati - Italy

==== 1982 ====
- Haruo Murase - Japan

==== 1983 ====
- Ikunoshin Kadono - Japan

==== 1984 ====
- B. K. Shah - India
- Benjamin Rush - USA

==== 1985 ====
- S. Bruce Black - USA

==== 1986 ====
- Robert E. Dineen - USA
- Jean-Baptiste Colbert - France

==== 1987 ====
- Victor Dover - United Kingdom
- Jorge Bande - Chile

==== 1988 ====
- Alex Möller - Germany
- John S. Bickley - USA
- Robert A. Beck - USA

==== 1989 ====
- Edwin S. Overman - USA
- Maurice R. Greenberg - USA

=== 1990s ===
==== 1990 ====
- Douglas A. Barlow - Canada

==== 1991 ====
- Alfred H. Pollard - Australia
- Horst K. Jannott - Germany

==== 1992 ====
- John E. Fisher - USA

==== 1993 ====
- C. Arthur Williams - USA
- Kenneth Black - USA

==== 1994 ====
- Davis W. Gregg - USA

==== 1995 ====
- Ronald M. Hubbs - USA
- Willem de Wit - Netherlands

==== 1996 ====
- Yong Ho Shin - South Korea
- Robert F. McDermott - USA

==== 1997 ====
- Alfonso Yuchengco - Philippines
- Saburo Kawai - Japan

==== 1998 ====
- Thomas Bassett Macaulay - Canada
- José Maria De Delas Y Miralles - Spain
- Hans Bühlmann - Switzerland

==== 1999 ====
- George J. Mecherle - USA
- Edwin A. G. Manton - USA
- Claude Bébéar - France

=== 2000s ===
==== 2000 ====
- Jose Pinera - Chile
- Hans Gerling - Germany

==== 2001 ====
- Josei Itoh - Japan
- Leo Goodwin, Sr. - USA
- James C. H. Anderson - USA

==== 2002 ====
- Lutgart Van den Berghe - Belgium
- Aad Jacobs - Netherlands
- Edison L. Bowers - USA

==== 2003 ====
- Edmund Tse - Hong Kong
- Clemente Cabello P. - Mexico

==== 2004 ====
- Kees J. Storm - Netherlands
- Takeo Inokuchi - Japan
- Per M. Hansson - Norway

==== 2005 ====
- William Meredith - Canada
- Walter Kielholz - Switzerland
- Ignacio Hernando de Larramendi - Spain

==== 2006 ====
- Siegfried Sellitsch - Austria
- Orio Giarini - Italy

==== 2007 ====
- Frederic Reiss - Bermuda
- José Manuel Martínez - Spain
- Robert Clements - USA

==== 2008 ====
- Patrick G. Ryan - USA
- Professor G. S. Diwan - India
- Dominic D'Alessandro - Canada

==== 2009 ====
- Sir David Rowland - United Kingdom
- Jack Byrne - USA

=== 2010s ===
==== 2010 ====
- Frank O'Halloran - Australia
- William C. Greenough - USA

==== 2011 ====
- Brian Duperreault - USA
- Guy Carpenter - USA

==== 2012 ====
- Ikuo Uno - Japan
- Manuel Povoas - Brazil

==== 2013 ====
- Robert Benmosche - USA

==== 2014 ====
- Robert Kiln - United Kingdom
- Denis Kessler - France

==== 2015 ====
- Stephen Catlin - United Kingdom

==== 2016 ====
- Donald Kramer - USA

==== 2017 ====
- Nikolaus von Bomhard - Germany

==== 2018 ====
- Shuzo Sumi - Japan

==== 2019 ====
- Michael A. Butt - Bermuda

==== 2021 ====
- Greig Woodring - USA

==== 2022 ====
- Larry Zimpleman - USA

==== 2023 ====
- Chang-Jae Shin - South Korea
