= Lillian Goodwin =

American businesswoman

Lillian Goodwin was an American businesswoman who co-founded private auto insurance company GEICO with her husband Leo Goodwin, Sr. in 1936.

She was the mother to Leo Goodwin, Jr. She moved to Fort Lauderdale, Florida in the 1960s. She died in 1970.

== Professional career ==
Lillian Goodwin worked alongside her husband to launch GEICO and took an active role in virtually all aspects of the early operation. Lillian, a bookkeeper by profession, took on the accounting tasks but also worked to underwrite policies, set rates, issue policies and market auto insurance to GEICO’s target customers, federal employees and the top three grades of non-commissioned military officers. She worked up to 12 hours a day at the inception of GEICO.
