= Phelsuma laticauda angularis =

Scientific classification
- Domain: Eukaryota
- Kingdom: Animalia
- Phylum: Chordata
- Class: Reptilia
- Order: Squamata
- Infraorder: Gekkota
- Family: Gekkonidae
- Genus: Phelsuma
- Species: P. laticauda
- Subspecies: P. l. angularis

Trinomial name
- Phelsuma laticauda angularis Mertens, 1964

Subspecies of lizard

Phelsuma laticauda angularis Mertens, 1964 is a diurnal subspecies of geckos. It lives in northern Madagascar and typically inhabits different trees and houses. The Gold dust day gecko feeds on insects and nectar.

== Description ==
This lizard is slightly smaller than the nominate form. It can reach a total length of about 11 cm (4 in). The body colour is a bright green or yellowish green or rarely even blue. Typical for this day gecko are the yellow speckles on the neck and the upper back. There are three rust-coloured transverse bars on the snout and head. The upper eyelid is blue. In contrast to the nominate form, there is a wide, irregular, v-shaped marking which points to the head on the lower back. The tail is wider and flatter than in Phelsuma laticauda laticauda. The ventral side is off-white.

== Distribution ==
This day gecko inhabits northwest Madagascar. It is only known from the region around Antsohihy.

== Habitat ==
P. laticauda angularis inhabits different trees, and other pantropic vegetation.

== Diet ==
These day geckos feed on various insects and other invertebrates. They also like to lick soft, sweet fruit, pollen and nectar.

== Behaviour ==
The males of this species are apparently not as aggressive as Phelsuma laticauda laticauda.

== Reproduction ==
The females lay up to 5 pairs of eggs. At a temperature of 28 °C, the young will hatch after approximately 40–45 days. The juveniles measure 55–60 mm. They should be kept separately since even the juveniles can be quite quarrelsome. Sexual maturity is reached after 10–12 months.

== Care and maintenance in captivity ==
These animals can be housed in pairs or small groups with one male and several females. They need a large, well planted terrarium. The temperature should be about 28 °C during the day and drop to around 20 °C at night. The humidity should be maintained between 65 and 75%. In captivity, these animals can be fed with crickets, wax moth, fruits flies, mealworms and houseflies.
