= AM Best =

American credit rating service

A.M. Best Company, Inc.
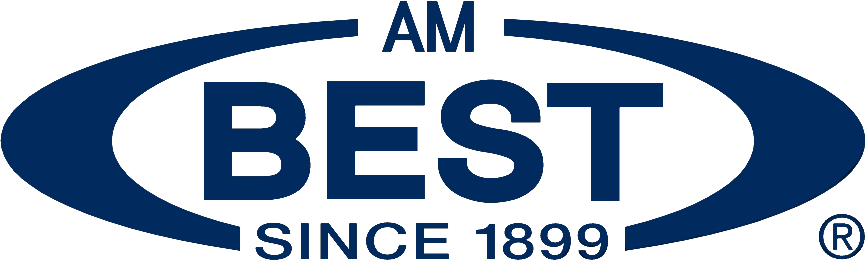
- Company type: Private
- Industry: Financial services
- Founded: 1899; 127 years ago
- Founder: Alfred M. Best
- Headquarters: Oldwick, New Jersey, U.S.
- Key people: Arthur Snyder III (chairman & president)
- Services: Rating agency, financial information publications
- Website: web.ambest.com

A.M. Best Company, Inc. is an American credit rating agency headquartered in Oldwick, New Jersey, that focuses on the insurance industry. Both the U.S. Securities and Exchange Commission and the National Association of Insurance Commissioners have designated the company as a Nationally Recognized Statistical Rating Organization (NRSRO) in the United States.

== Business ==
AM Best issues financial-strength ratings measuring insurance companies' ability to pay claims. It also rates financial instruments issued by insurance companies, such as bonds, notes, and securitization products.

AM Best publishes a series of printed and online resources of insurance professionals and publications. The oldest and best known is Best's Recommended Insurance Attorneys & Adjusters. Insurance publications include BestWeek, a weekly newsletter, Best's Review, a monthly digital & print magazine, and an online wire service called BestWire.

== History ==
Founded in 1899 by Alfred M. Best in New York City, the privately held company moved to Morristown, New Jersey, in 1965, and subsequently to Oldwick in 1974. It also maintains offices in London, Hong Kong, Dubai, Mexico City, Singapore and a news bureau in Washington, D.C.

While the company is a primary source for national insurance industry statistics in the United States, it is becoming increasingly well known in Europe, the Pacific Rim and Latin America. The company's London offices consist of A.M. Best Europe—Rating Services and A.M. Best Europe—Information Services. A.M. Best Asia-Pacific is located in Hong Kong and Singapore. A.M. Best America Latina is located in Mexico City. AM Best recently opened a branch of A.M. Best Europe in Amsterdam that provides Ratings Services.

== See also ==
- Nationally Recognized Statistical Rating Organization
