= Alfred M. Best =

American actuary

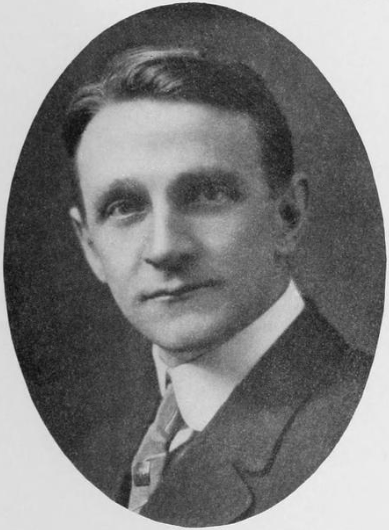
- Born: Alfred Magilton Best; August 31, 1876; Caldwell, New Jersey, US
- Died: May 6, 1958 (aged 81); New York, New York, US
- Occupation: Insurance executive

Alfred Magilton Best (August 31, 1876 – May 6, 1958) was an American insurance industry executive who founded the firm now known as AM Best to evaluate the financial stability of insurance companies, their ability to pay claims, as well as the financial viability of surplus notes and other financial instruments issued by insurers.

== Biography ==
Born on August 3, 1876, in Caldwell, New Jersey, Best was first hired in the insurance industry as a teenager, working for insurers and brokers. Working for a planned insurance company in his late teens and earning a "princely sum" of a salary that he thought was unjustifiably high, he realized that the company he was working for was a "den of thieves". Working for The Spectator, a leading insurance publication, he realized that there were insurers who were issuing policies but lacked the capital to adequately cover losses. In 1897, Best started a business with two other partners to produce financial reports on insurers, but the partnership fizzled out after 18 months.

Building on his industry experience, Best established his eponymous company in 1899 to provide guidance to brokers and customers about the financial status of insurers based on analysis of their accounting records. Beginning with a series of annual evaluations, he added monthly reports in 1904 and started issuing formal ratings in 1906. After the 1906 San Francisco earthquake, Best and his staff devoted months to producing a report analyzing the impact of fire losses experienced by more than 200 insurers, which generated sales of 250,000 copies and generated publicity for A. M. Best.

In 1958, Best was named Insurance Man of the Year by the Federation of Insurance Counsels. He was posthumously inducted into the Insurance Hall of Fame in 1962.

In addition to his insurance and construction interests, Best grew flowers and ran a dairy farm in Peru, Vermont. A resident of Sutton Place South in Manhattan, he died on May 6, 1958, and was survived by a daughter and a son.
