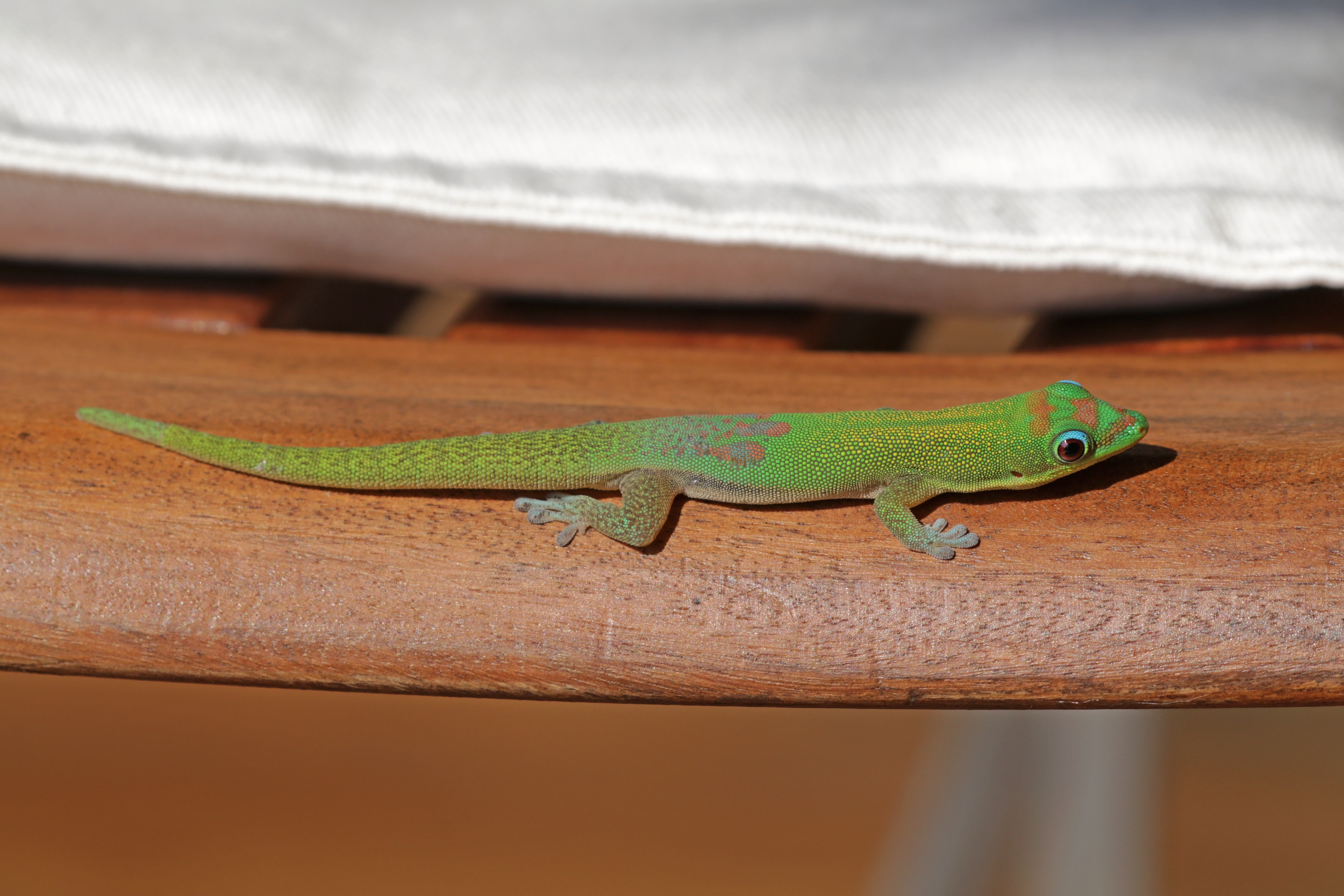
- Island of Nosy Komba, Madagascar

Conservation status
- Least Concern (IUCN 3.1)

Scientific classification
- Kingdom: Animalia
- Phylum: Chordata
- Class: Reptilia
- Order: Squamata
- Suborder: Gekkota
- Family: Gekkonidae
- Genus: Phelsuma
- Species: P. laticauda

Binomial name
- Phelsuma laticauda (Boettger, 1880)
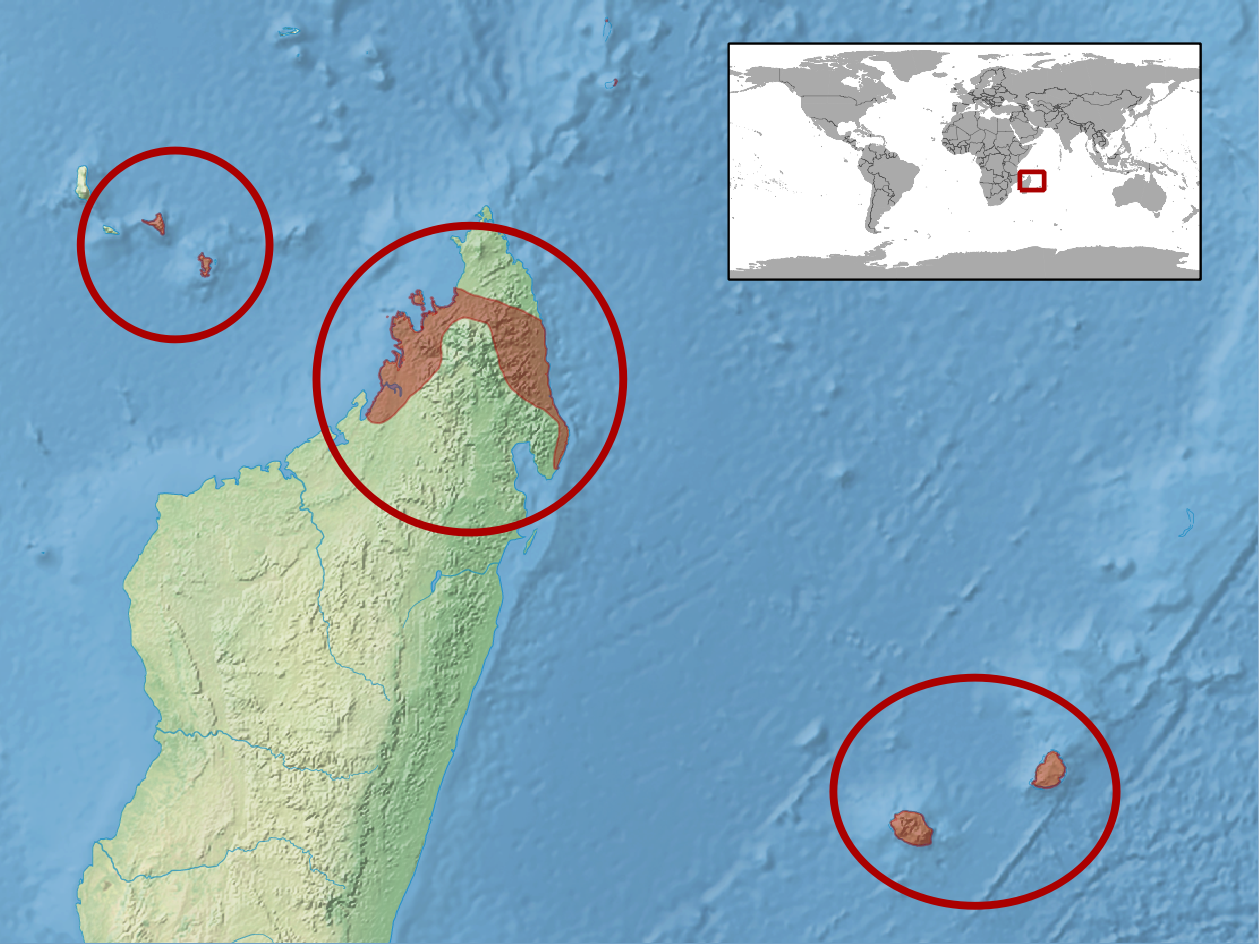

Synonyms
- Pachydactylus laticauda Boettger, 1880

= Gold dust day gecko =

Species of lizard

The gold dust day gecko (Phelsuma laticauda) is a diurnal species of gecko. It lives in northern Madagascar, the Comoro Islands, and the Mascarene Islands; it has also been introduced to Hawaii and other Pacific islands. It is primarily an arboreal species which can be found in tropical forests and may also associate with human dwellings. The gold dust day gecko feeds on insects and nectar.

One subspecies is recognized (in addition to the nominate one): Phelsuma laticauda angularis.

== Description ==
This lizard can reach a total length of 3.9–5.1″ (10–13cm). The body colour is a bright green or yellowish green or rarely blue. Typical for this day gecko are the gold speckles on the neck and the upper back. There are three rust-coloured transverse bars on the snout and head; the upper part of the skin around the eye is blue. On the lower back there are three tapering red bars. The tail is slightly flattened. The under side is off-white. Juveniles lack the red colourations and the tail and limbs appear off-white.

== Diet ==
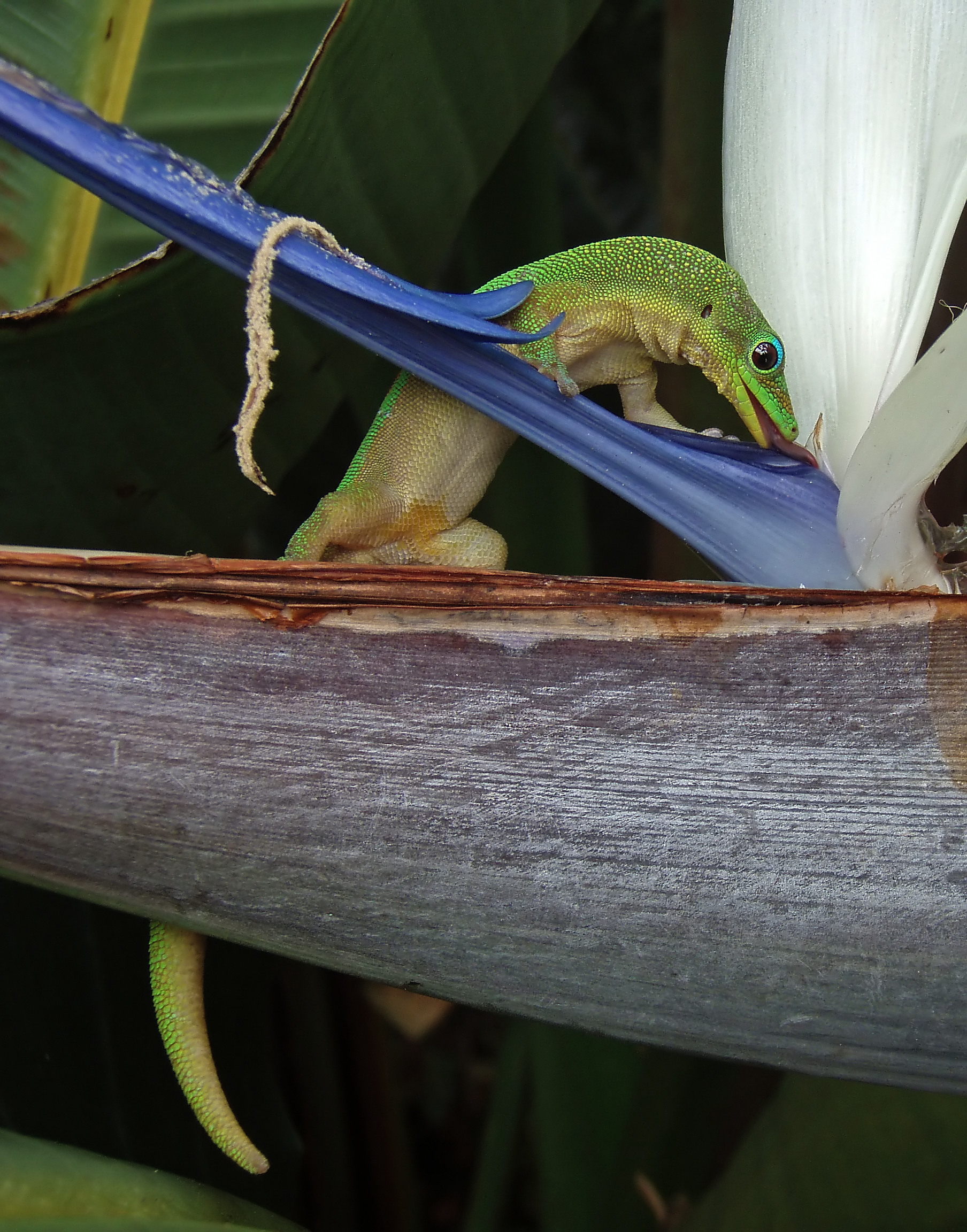
Phelsuma laticauda laticauda licking nectar from the 'bird of paradise' flower of Strelitzia

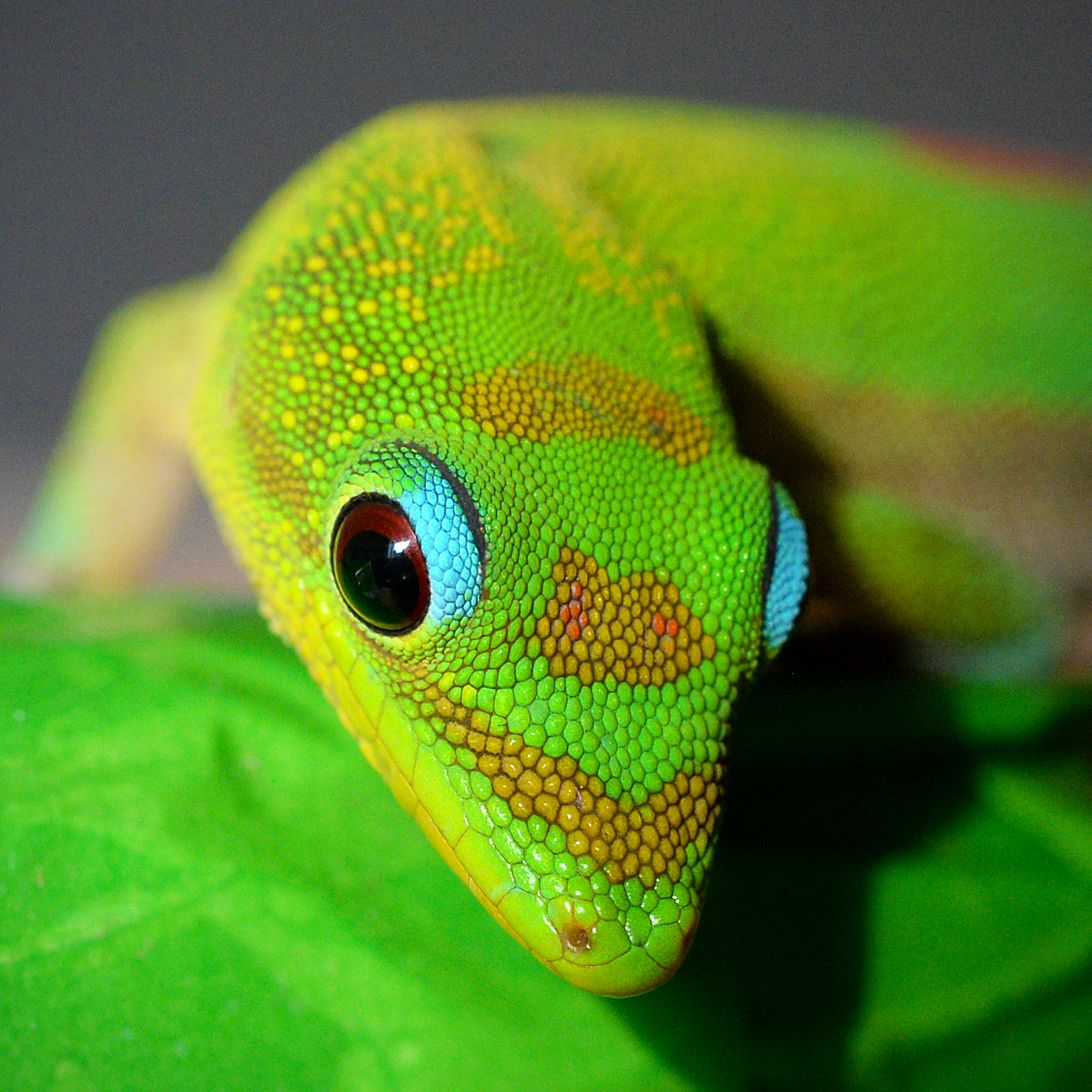
Close-up of gold dust day gecko on the island of Hawaii

These day geckos feed on various insects and other invertebrates, and are capable of eating other smaller lizards. They also eat soft, sweet fruit and pollen and nectar from flowers, often congregating in groups of many individuals to feed off of one plant.

== Behavior ==
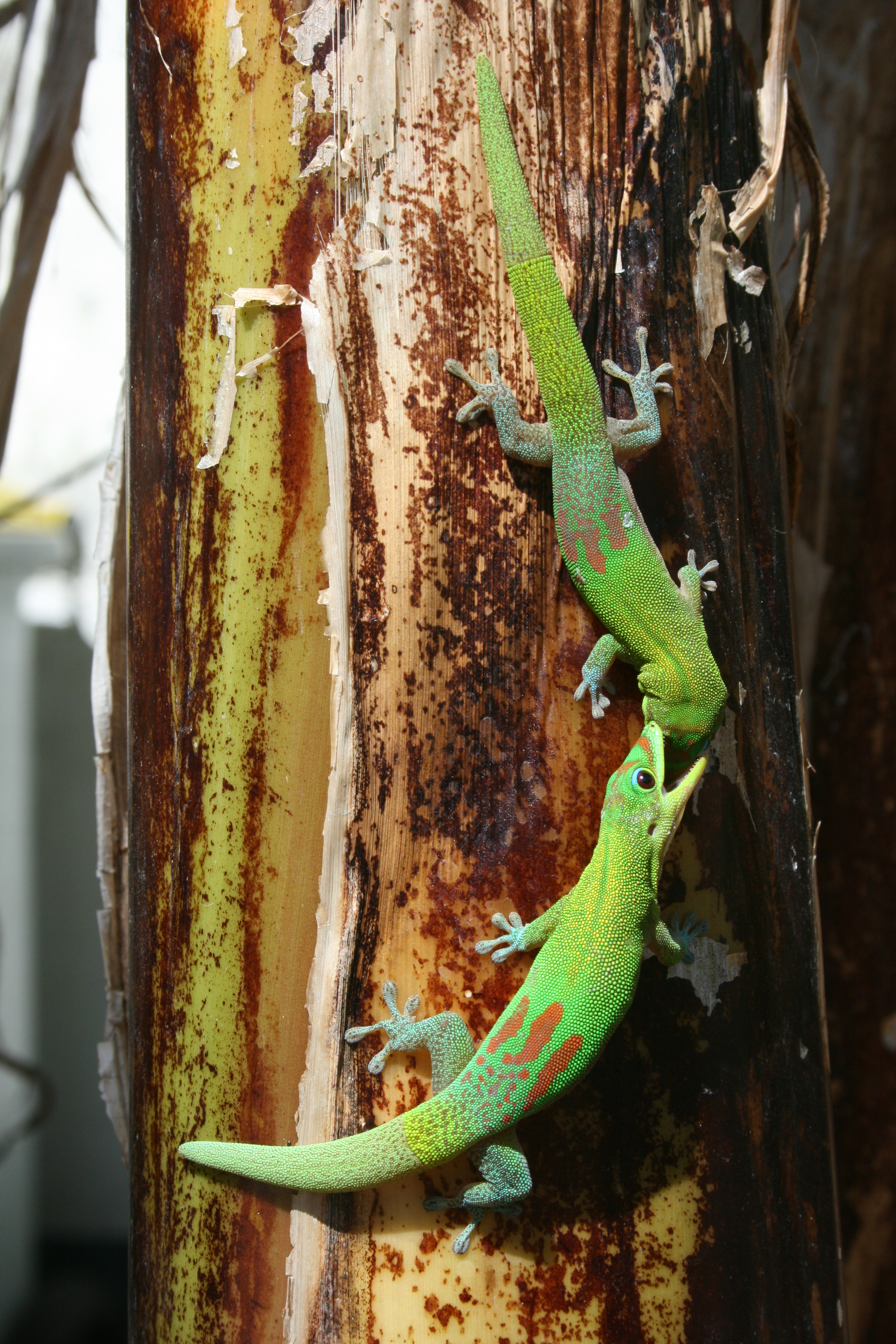
Gold dust day geckos fighting on a banana plant in central Saint-Denis, Réunion

The males of this species are rather aggressive. They do not accept other males in their territory. In captivity, where the females cannot escape, the males may also seriously wound a female.

== Reproduction ==
The females lay 1–2 eggs. At a temperature of 28 °C, the young will hatch after approximately 40–45 days. The juveniles measure 55–60 mm. They should be kept separately since the juveniles can be quite quarrelsome. Sexual maturity is reached after 10–12 months.

== Captivity ==
This gecko is occasionally kept as a pet; with good care, this species may live up to 15 years.

== In popular culture ==
Since 1999, an anthropomorphic and English-speaking Gold dust day gecko, voiced by British actor Jake Dylan Wood has appeared as the mascot for the American vehicle insurance Company GEICO.The inclusion of the gecko in their advertisements has since become a key part of the marketing of the company.
