= Aad Jacobs =

Dutch businessman

Adrianus G. Jacobs (born 1936) is a Dutch businessman, the former chairman of Royal Dutch Shell from 2004 to 2006, and of ING Group from 1992 to 1998.

Jacobs has been a director of numerous companies. In 2002, Jacobs was inducted into the Insurance Hall of Fame.
