= Arno Breker =

German sculptor, a favorite of Adolf Hitler

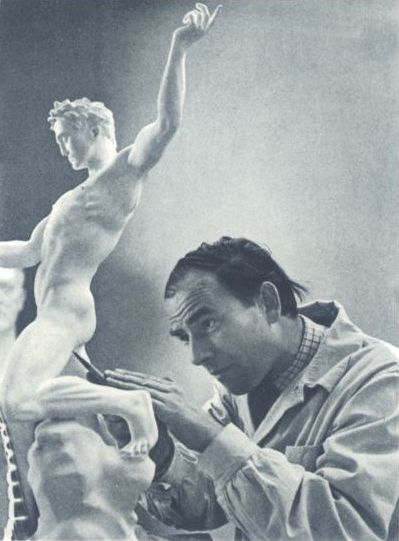
- Breker in the 1930s
- Born: 19 July 1900; Elberfeld, Kingdom of Prussia, German Empire
- Died: 13 February 1991 (aged 90); Düsseldorf, Germany
- Known for: Sculpting
- Spouses: Demetra Messala (m. 1937; died 1956); Charlotte Kluge (m. 1958)
- Children: 2

Olympic medal record

Art competitions
Silver medal – second place	1936 Berlin	Statues

Arno Breker (19 July 1900 – 13 February 1991) was a German sculptor who is best known for his public works in Nazi Germany, where he was endorsed by the authorities as the antithesis of degenerate art. He was made official state sculptor and exempted from military service. One of his better known statues is Die Partei, representing the spirit of the Nazi Party, which flanked one side of the carriage entrance to Albert Speer's new Reich Chancellery.

After the fall of Nazi Germany in 1945 Breker continued to thrive professionally as a sculptor in the new West Germany.

== Life ==
Breker was born in Elberfeld, in the west of Germany, the son of stonemason Arnold Breker. He began to study architecture, along with stone-carving and anatomy. At age 20 he entered the Düsseldorf Academy of Arts where he concentrated on sculpture, studying under Hubert Netzer and Wilhelm Kreis. He first visited Paris in 1924, shortly before finishing his studies. There he met with Jean Cocteau, Jean Renoir, Pablo Picasso, Daniel-Henry Kahnweiler, and Alfred Flechtheim. In 1927 he moved to Paris, which he thereafter considered to be his home, in the same year he had an exhibition with Alf Bayrle. Breker was quickly accepted by the art dealer Alfred Flechtheim. He also established close relationships with important figures in the art world, including Charles Despiau, Isamu Noguchi, Maurice de Vlaminck and André Dunoyer de Segonzac, all of whom he later portrayed. He travelled to North Africa, producing lithographs which he published under the title "Tunisian Journey". He also visited Aristide Maillol, who was later to describe Breker as "Germany's Michelangelo".

Adolf Hitler in Paris, 1940, with Albert Speer (left) and Arno Breker (right)

In 1932, he was awarded a prize by the Prussian Ministry of Culture, which allowed him to stay in Rome for a year. In 1934 he returned to Germany on the advice of Max Liebermann. At this time Alfred Rosenberg, editor of the Nazi newspaper Völkischer Beobachter, actually denounced some of Breker's work as degenerate art. However, Breker was supported by many Nazi leaders, especially Adolf Hitler. Even Rosenberg later hailed his sculptures as expressions of the "mighty momentum and will power" ("Wucht und Willenhaftigkeit") of Nazi Germany. He took commissions from the Nazis from 1933 through 1942, for example participating in a show of his work in occupied Paris in 1942, where he met Jean Cocteau, who appreciated his work. He maintained personal relationships with Albert Speer and with Hitler. In 1936 he won the commission for two sculptures representing athletic prowess, to be entered in the 1936 Olympic games arts competition in Berlin, one representing a Decathlete ("Zehnkämpfer"), which won the silver medal for statues, and the other The Victress ("Die Siegerin"). In 1937 he married Demetra Messala (Δήμητρα Μεσσάλα), a Greek model. The same year, Breker joined the Nazi Party and was made "official state sculptor" by Hitler, given a large property and provided a studio with forty-three assistants. Breker was on a list of 378 "Gottbegnadeten" (divinely gifted) artists exempted from wartime military duty by Hitler and chief propagandist Joseph Goebbels. His twin sculptures The Party and The Army held a prominent position at the entrance to Albert Speer's new Reich Chancellery, as well as Josef Thorak's "Striding Horses" (1939), which until 1945 flanked the entrance stairs on the garden front of Adolf Hitler's Reich Chancellery in Berlin.

The neoclassical nature of his work, with titles like Comradeship, Torchbearer, and Sacrifice, typified Nazi ideals, and suited the characteristics of Nazi architecture. On closer inspection, though, the proportions of his figures, the highly colouristic treatment of his surfaces (the strong contrasts between dark and light accents), and the melodramatic tension of their musculatures perhaps invites comparison with the Italian Mannerist sculptors of the 16th century. This Mannerist tendency to Breker's neoclassicism may suggest closer affinities to concurrent expressionist tendencies in German Modernism than is acknowledged.

Until the fall of the Third Reich, Breker was a professor of visual arts in Berlin.

== Post-Nazi career ==
Ninety percent of Breker's public works were destroyed during the bombings of Germany toward the end of the war. In 1946, Breker was offered a commission by Soviet leader Joseph Stalin, but he refused, saying "One dictatorship is sufficient for me". In 1948 Breker was designated as a "fellow traveller" of the Nazis and fired, despite which he continued to thrive professionally. He returned to Düsseldorf, now in the new West Germany, which remained his base, with periods of residence in Paris. During this time he worked as an architect. However, he continued to receive commissions for sculptures, producing a number of works in his familiar classical style, working for businesses and individual patrons. He also produced many portrait busts. In 1970 he was commissioned by the king of Morocco to produce work for the United Nations Building in Casablanca, but the work was destroyed. Many other works followed, including sculptures for Düsseldorf's city hall, portraits of Anwar Sadat and Konrad Adenauer, and a statue of Pallas Athene, helmeted and throwing a spear in the same classical style as his Nazi-era work. Breker's rehabilitation continued, culminating in the creation of a Breker museum, funded by the Bodenstein family, who set aside Schloss Nörvenich (between Aachen and Cologne) for the purpose. The Arno Breker Museum was inaugurated in 1985, and was still open as of 2021.

Breker's rehabilitation led to backlash from anti-Nazi activists, including controversy in Paris when some of his works were exhibited at the Centre Georges Pompidou in 1981. In the same year anti-Breker demonstrations accompanied an exhibition in Berlin. Breker's admirers insisted that he had never supported the Nazis' ideology, but merely accepted their patronage.

Breker's last major work was a monumental sculpture of Alexander the Great intended to be located in Greece.

== Marriages and family ==
Arno Breker was married twice. His first wife, Demetra Messala, was a Greek model; they got married in 1937. She died in 1956 in a car accident. He remarried in 1958 to Charlotte Kluge. They had two children, Gerhart (1959) and Carola (1962). Breker remained married to Kluge until his death in 1991.

== Portraits (mostly in bronze) ==
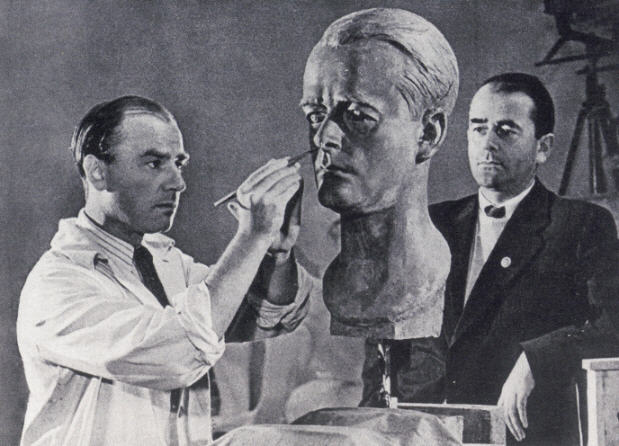
Arno Breker modelling a portrait of Albert Speer in 1940

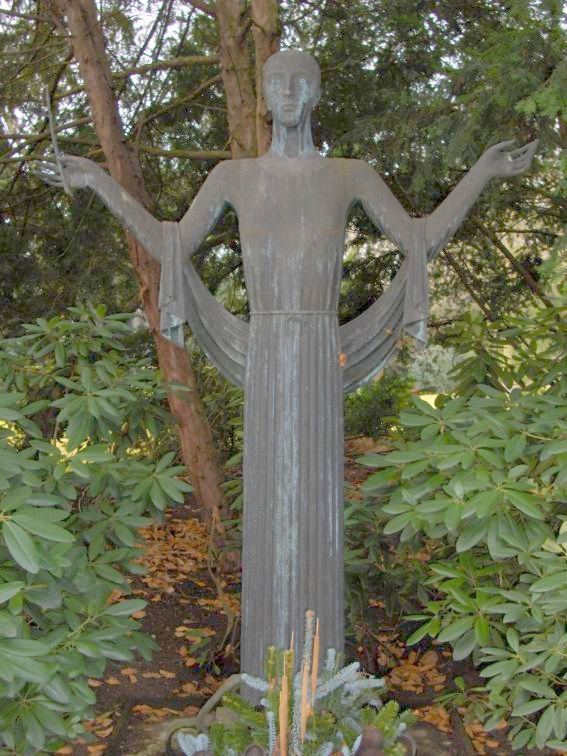
Arno Breker's Grave in Düsseldorf

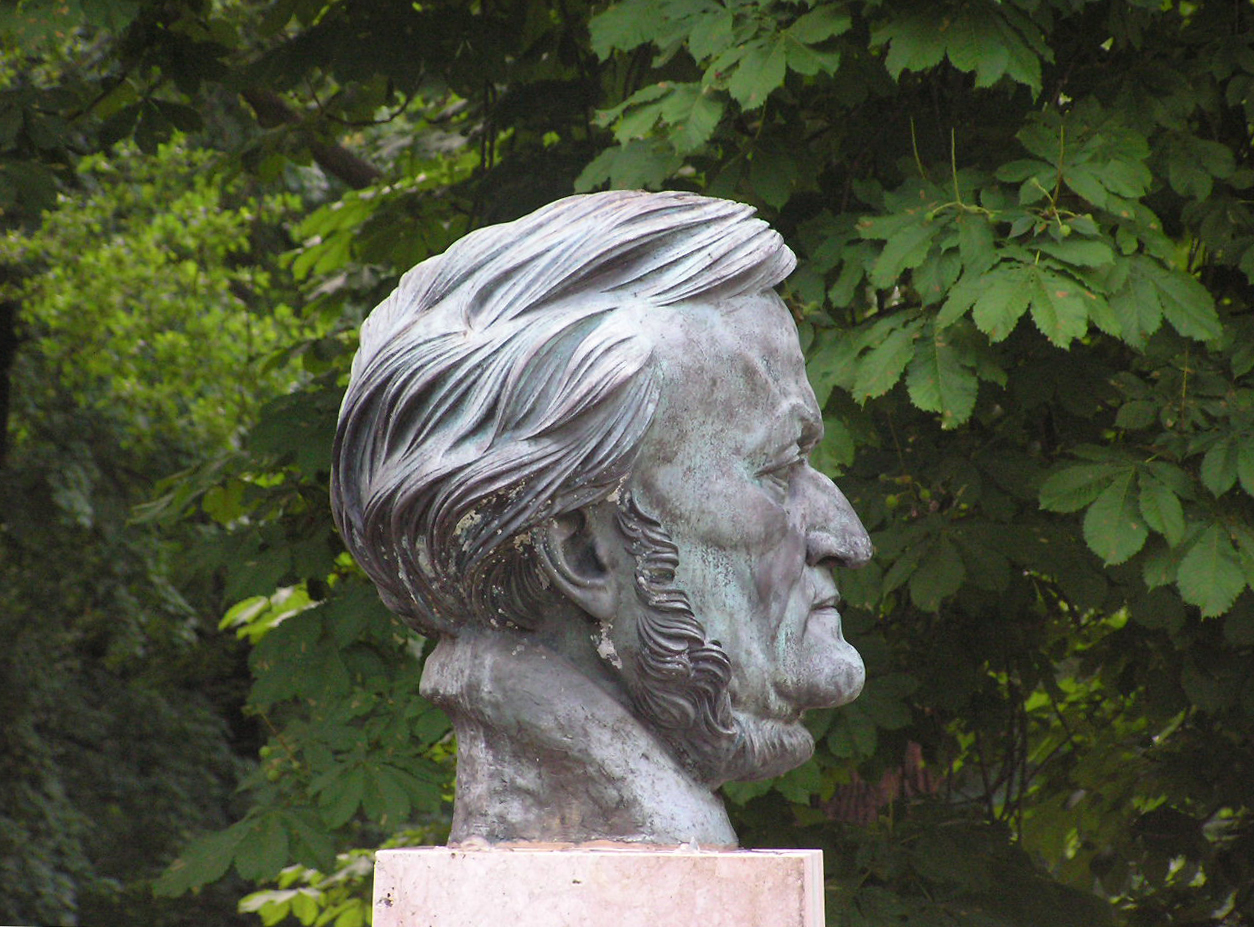
Bust of Richard Wagner in Bayreuth

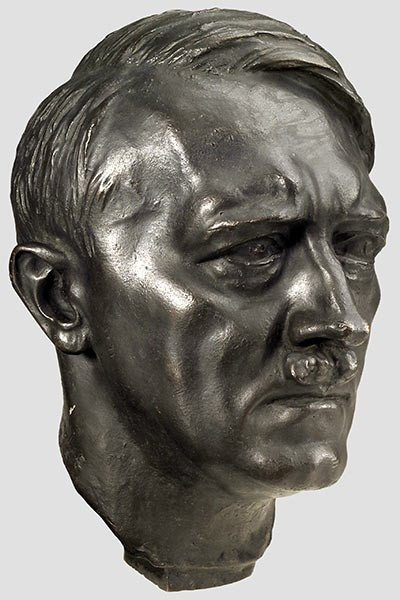
Bust of Adolf Hitler (1938)

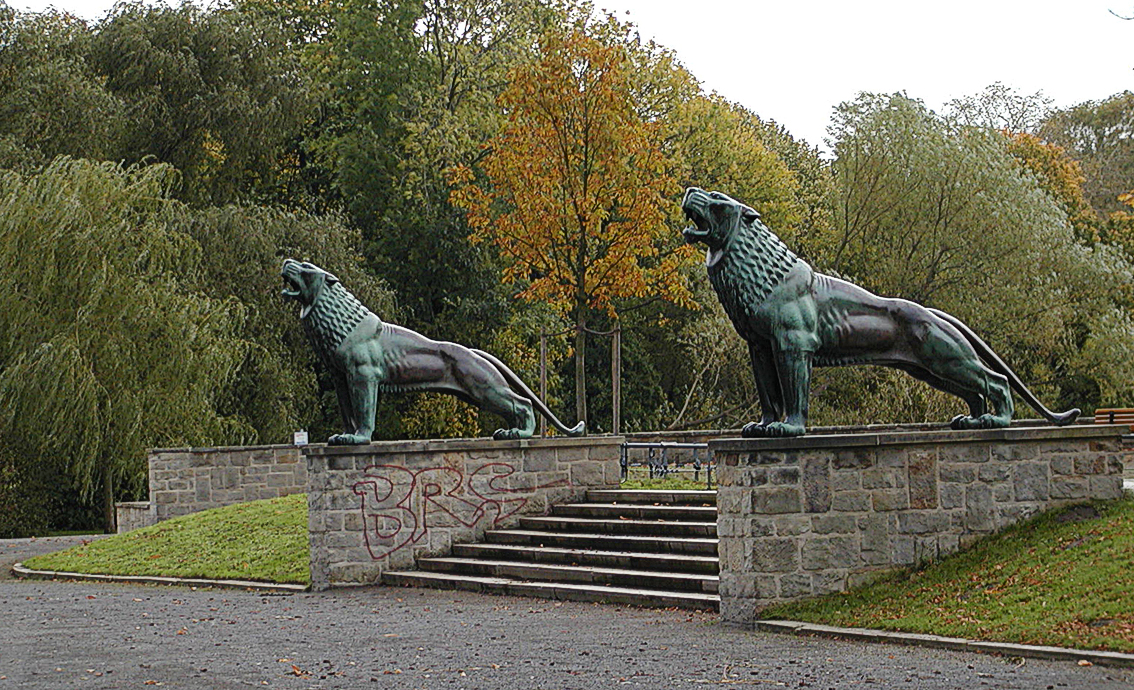
Lions at Löwenbastion in Hanover, Maschsee

- Baron von Mirbach, 1920
- Friedrich Ebert, Berlin 1924 (first state commission)
- Walter Kaesbach, Düsseldorf, 1925
- Artur Kaufmann, 1925
- Herbert Eulenberg, 1925–26
- Otto Dix, Paris 1926–27
- Isamu Noguchi, Paris 1927
- Hermann Kesser, 1927
- Moissey Kogan, Paris 1927/28
- Inge Davemann, 1928
- Albert Lindgens, 1928
- Walter Lindgens, 1928
- Illa Fudickar, 1929
- Robert Gerling, 1929
- Arnold von Guilleaume, 1929
- Jean Marchand, 1929
- Mossey Kogan, 1929
- H. R. von Langen, 1929
- Alberto Giacometti
- Isolde von Conta, 1930
- Abraham Frohwein, 1930
- Heinrich Heine, 1930
- Edith Arnthal, 1930–31
- Demetra Breker, 1931
- Nico Mazaraki, 1931
- Robert Valancey, Paris 1931
- Prince Georg of Bavaria, 1932
- Andreas von Siemens, Berlin 1932
- Nina Bausch, 1933
- Demetra Breker, 1933
- Olga von Dahlgreen, 1933
- Arthur Kampf, 1933
- Victor Manheimer, 1933
- Nora von Schnitzler, 1933
- Robert de Valencay, 1933
- Max Liebermann, 1934
- Gottfried Bermann Fischer, 1934
- Max Baldner, 1934
- Kurt Edzard, 1934
- Graf von Luckner, 1934
- Anne-Marie Merkel, 1934–35
- Pütze von Siemens, 1934–35
- Kurt Edzard, 1935
- Anne-Marie Merkel, 1935
- Pütze von Siemens, 1935–36
- Carl Friedrich von Siemens, 1936
- Leo von König, 1936
- Joseph Goebbels, 1937
- Paul von Hindenburg, 1937
- Wolfgang Reindl, 1938
- Adolf Hitler, 1938
- Richard Wagner, 1939
- Gerda Bormann (wife of Martin Bormann), 1940
- Edda Göring (daughter of Hermann Göring), 1941
- Albert Speer, 1941
- Margarete Speer (wife of Albert Speer), 1941
- Bernhard Rust
- Erika Baeumker (wife of Adolf Baeumker), approx 1941
- Gerhart Hauptmann, 1942
- Serge Lifar, 1942–43
- Aristide Maillol, 1942–43
- Alfred Cortot, 1942–43
- Abel Bonnard, 1943
- Wilhelm Kreis, 1943
- Maurice de Vlaminck, 1943
- Claude Flammarion, 1944
- Gottfried Ude-Bernays, 1945
- Johannes Bork, 1946
- Lothar Albano Müller, 1950
- Ludwig Hoelscher, 1952
- Gustav Lindemann, 1952
- Wilhelm Kempff, 1953
- Emperor Haile Selassie I of Ethiopia, 1955
- Rolf Gerling, 1956
- Hans Gerling
- Friedrich Sieburg, 1961
- Jean Cocteau, 1963
- Jean Marais, 1963
- Henry de Montherlant, 1964
- Marcel Pagnol, 1964
- Roger Peyrefitte, 1964
- Jeanne Castel, 1964
- Paul Morand, 1965
- Jacques Benoist-Méchin, 1965
- Henry Picker
- André Dunoyer de Segonzac, 1966
- Marcel Midy
- Ezra Pound, 1967
- King Mohammed V of Morocco
- Princess Ira von Fürstenberg
- Louis-Ferdinand Céline, 1970
- Salvador Dalí, 1974–75
- Ernst Fuchs, 1976–77
- Leopold Sedar Senghor, 1978
- Anwar El Sadat, 1980
- Ernst Jünger, 1981–82
- Richard Wagner, Cosima Wagner, Franz Liszt, 1982
- Heinrich Heine, 1983
- Peter und Irene Ludwig, 1986–87
- Gerhard Hauptmann, 1988
- Arno Breker (self-portrait), 1991

== Sculptures 1935–1945 ==
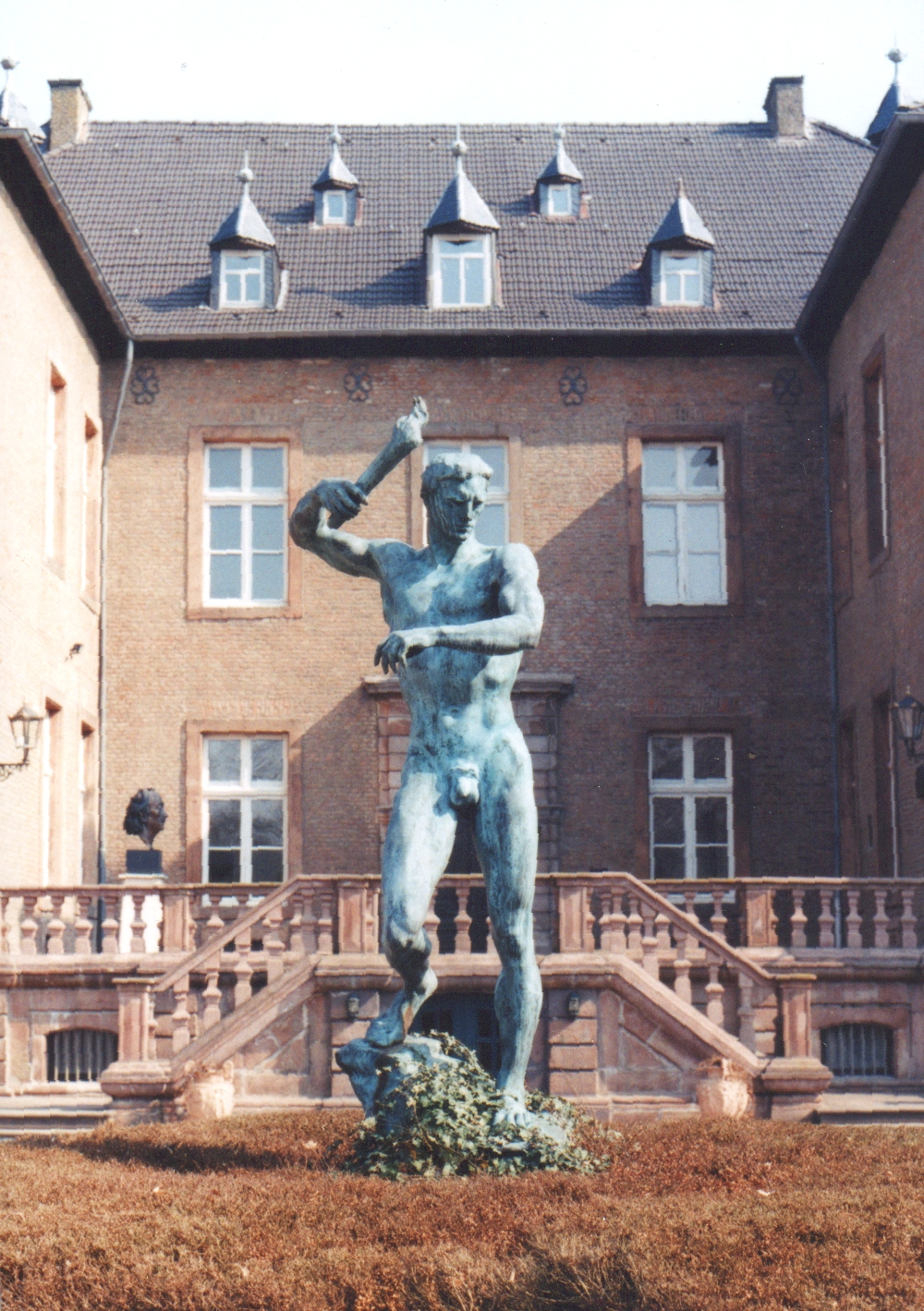
Prometheus

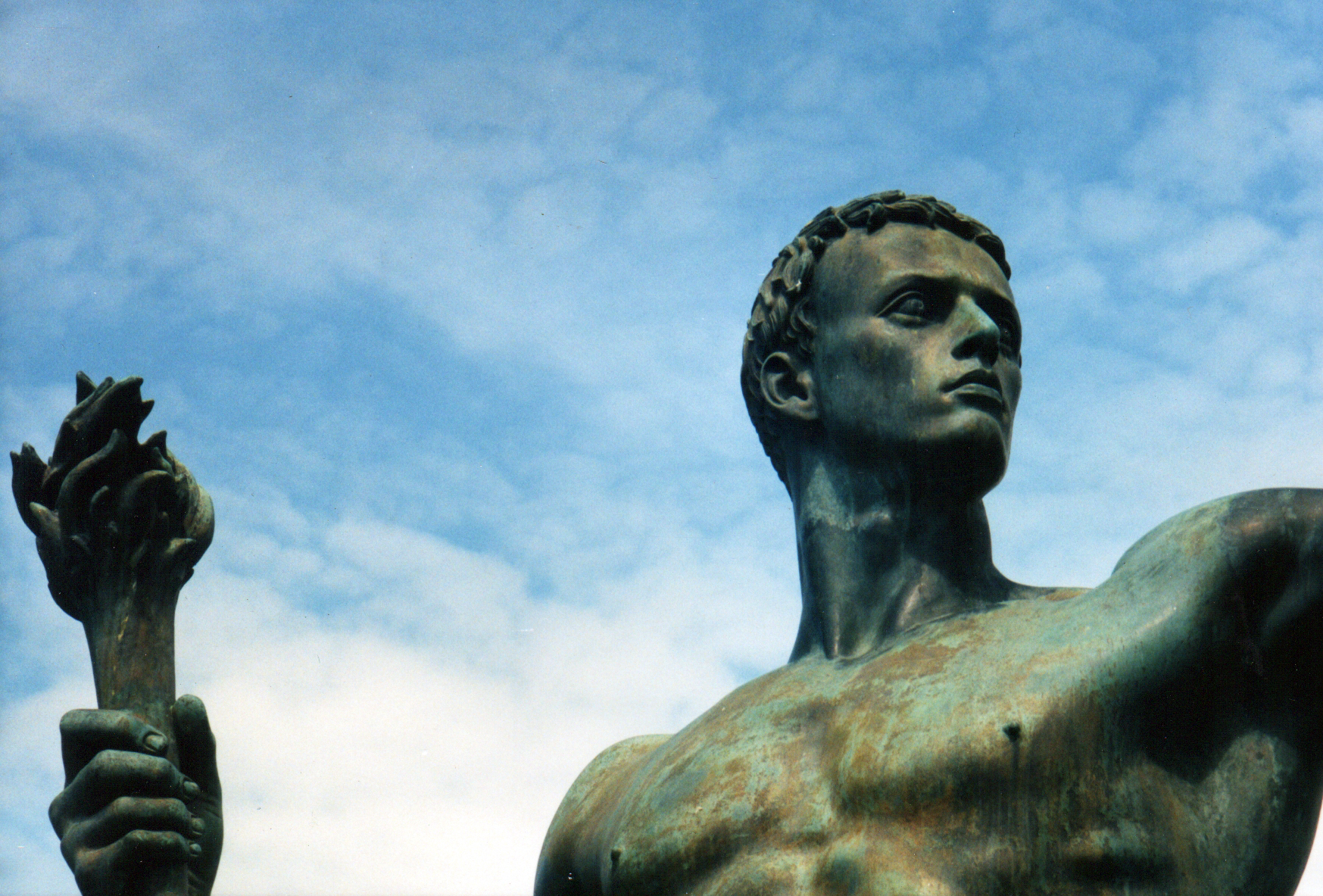
Die Partei, Breker's statue representing the spirit of the Nazi Party that flanked one side of the carriage entrance to Albert Speer's new Reich Chancellery

- Prometheus (1935)
- Relief on the Nordstern life insurance building, Berlin (1936)
- Der Zehnkämpfer (The Decathlete) for the Olympic Stadium, Berlin (1936, Silver medal)
- Die Siegerin (The [female] Victor) for the Olympic Stadium, Berlin (1936)
- Dionysos (Dionysius) for the Olympic Village, Berlin (1936)
- Der Verwundete (The Wounded) (1938)
- Der Rosseführer (The Horse Leader) (1938)
- Anmut (Grace) (1938)
- Fackelträger („Die Partei") (Torchbearers ("The Party")) in the courtyard of the New Reich Chancellery (1939)
- Schwertträger („Die Wehrmacht") (Sword-bearers ("The Wehrmacht")) in the courtyard of the New Reich Chancellery (1939)
- Schreitende Pferde (Walking horses), front garden, New Reich Chancellery (1939)
- Der Künder (The Herald) (1939)
- Der Wäger (The Risk-Taker / Venturer) (1939)
- Bereitschaft (Readiness) (1939)
- Der Rächer (The Avenger) (1940)
- Kameraden (Comrades) (1940), Breker-Museum
- Bannerträger (Banner-bearer) (1940)
- Abschied (Farewell) (1940)
- Vernichtung (Annihilation) (1940)
- Opfer (Victim) (1940)
- Schreitende (Striders) (1940)
- Der Wächter (The Sentry) (1941)
- Psyche (1941)
- Berufung (Calling) (1941)
- Der Sieger (The Victor) (1942)
- Kniende (Kneeling Woman) (1942)
- Eos (1942)
- Flora (1943)
- Heros (1943)

== Reliefs ==
- Der Genius (1938)
- Der Kämpfer (The Fighter) (1938)
- Apollo and Daphne
- Auszug zum Kampf (Departure for Battle) (1941)
- Aufbruch der Kämpfer (Departure of the Fighters) (1940–41)
- Der Rufer (The Caller) (1941)
- Orpheus and Eurydice (1944, Breker-Museum)

== Books by Breker ==
- 1970 – Paris, Hitler et Moi ("Paris, Hitler and Me") Presses de la Cité.
- 1983 – Schriften ("Writings") Bonn: Marco-Edition ISBN 3-921754-19-4.
- 1987 – Begegnungen und Betrachtungen ("Encounters and Reflections") Bonn: Marco-Edition ISBN 3-921754-27-5.
- 2000 – Über allem Schönheit ("Above All Beauty") Arnshaugk. ISBN 3-935172-02-8

== Films and videos ==
- Arno Breker – Harte Zeit, starke Kunst, by Arnold Fanck, Hans Cürlis, Riefenstahl-Film GmbH, Berlin (1944)
- Arno Breker – Skulpturen und Musik, by Marco J. Bodenstein, 20 minutes, Marco-Edition Bonn.
- Arno Breker – Deutsche Lebensläufe, colour film, 60 minutes, Marco-VG, Bonn (2002)
- Paris-Rom-Berlin und Arno Breker, and interview with Albert Speer. Colour film, 60 minutes, EKS Museum Europäische Kunst, Schloss 52388 Nörvenich.
- Zeit der Götter (Time of the Gods) (1992)

== See also ==
- Art of the Third Reich
- Chantons sous l'Occupation (documentary film)
- Conrad Hommel
- Werner Peiner
- Adolf Wissel
