= Hans Gerling =

German insurance businessman (1915–1991)

Hans Gerling (June 6, 1915 – August 14, 1991) was a German businessman who headed the Gerling-Konzern, one of Europe's largest insurance groups, from 1949 until his death.

He was born in Cologne, the second of three sons of Auguste nee Hoffmeister and Robert Gerling, founder of the Cologne-based Gerling insurance company. Hans Gerling joined the Gerling Konzern in 1937 and became CEO in 1949.

After the death of Robert Gerling in 1935, management of the Gerling-Konzern, which was the largest privately owned insurance company in Europe, passed first to Walter Forstreuter, then to Hans Gerling's brother Robert Gerling II, and finally, in 1939 when Robert Gerling II emigrated to the United States, to Hans Gerling. At the end of World War II, the US military government allowed the Gerling insurance company to reopen for business with Forstreuter at its head. On November 13, 1948 Forstreuter resigned from the chairmanship in favor of Hans Gerling, who became chairman of all Gerling companies in January 1949.

Control of the Gerling insurance group sparked a long legal battle between the three brothers. A settlement provided that Hans Gerling and initially his brother Walter retained the German companies of the Gerling Group, Robert received DM 30 million as compensation and the Swiss and American companies.

Hans Gerling initiated the construction of the Gerling skyscraper in Cologne Gereonsviertel, inviting sculptor Arno Breker to participate in the design. It was completed on January 25, 1953.

In 1954, Hans Gerling established Gerling-Konzern Globale Rückversicherungs-AG, an international reinsurance holding company, and Gerling Globale became the first German insurance company to expand overseas. Gerling founded on April 20, 1954, the Gerling Speziale Kreditversicherungs-AG, which initially operated credit, suretyship and fidelity insurance. After the departure of his youngest brother Walter, Hans Gerling took over in 1965 the sole management.

Together with Herbert Quandt and Emil Georg Bührle, Hans Gerling financed Ivan David Herstatt's Herstatt Bank, in which Gerling held a majority share. In 1974, enormous losses at the Herstatt Bank forced Hans Gerling to sell the Gerling insurance business.

He later recovered control of the company, which is now run by his son Rolf Gerling.

Hans Gerling was inducted into the Insurance Hall of Fame in 2000, alongside Otto Von Bismarck, one of only seven Germans to be so honored in the history of the industry.

== Books and films about Hans Gerling ==
- Thoughts of an outstanding entrepreneur, book by Hans and Rolf Gerling
- Dynastien in NRW: Gerling - das Geschäft mit der Sicherheit. WDR-Fernsehen
- "Mahlzeit, Herr Direktor" by Günther Wallraff: Steckbrief eines Unerwünschten Die lange Günter-Wallraff-Nacht | WDR Fernsehen.
