= Leo Goodwin Jr. =

Leo Goodwin Jr. (c. 1929-1930 - January 15 1978) was an American businessman, born to the co-founders of auto insurance company GEICO: Lillian Goodwin and Leo Goodwin Sr. He became involved in the family business. He filed for personal bankruptcy in 1976, and he died at the age of 63 on January 15, 1978, of cancer in Fort Lauderdale, Florida, following a two-month hospital stay.
