= Albert Henry Mowbray =

American businessman

Albert Henry Mowbray (30 March 1881 – 7 January 1949) was an American economist.

He was born in San Francisco on 30 March 1881 and attended the University of California, Berkeley. Upon earning his degree in 1904, Mowbray worked for New York Life Insurance Company and later Liberty Mutual. He was also an actuary for state-level insurance commissions in New Carolina and California and the National Council on Workmen's Insurance. Mowbray began his teaching career in 1910 as a lecturer in insurance at his alma mater. When he resigned from the National Council on Workmen's Compensation in 1923, Mowbray accepted an associate professorship. He was subsequently appointed full professor and retained the position until his death. In his later career, Mowbray served as an advisor to the state governments of Idaho, Utah, Colorado, and Arizona on labor and compensation matters, as well as the California cities of Berkeley, Palo Alto, and San Francisco. His work with the federal government included stints on the Presidential Committee on Economic Security and Presidential Advisory Committee on Social Security, both convened by Franklin D. Roosevelt. Over the course of his career, Mowbray was elected a fellow of the Casualty Society of America, the Actuarial Society of America, and of the American Statistical Association.

Mowbray was married to Elizabeth Gray. The couple had two children, daughter Mary Elizabeth and son Albert Gray Mowbray, an astronomer. Albert Henry Mowbray suffered a heart attack on 31 December 1948, and died a week later of coronary occlusion in Berkeley, California.
