= GEICO =

American auto insurance company

Government Employees Insurance Company

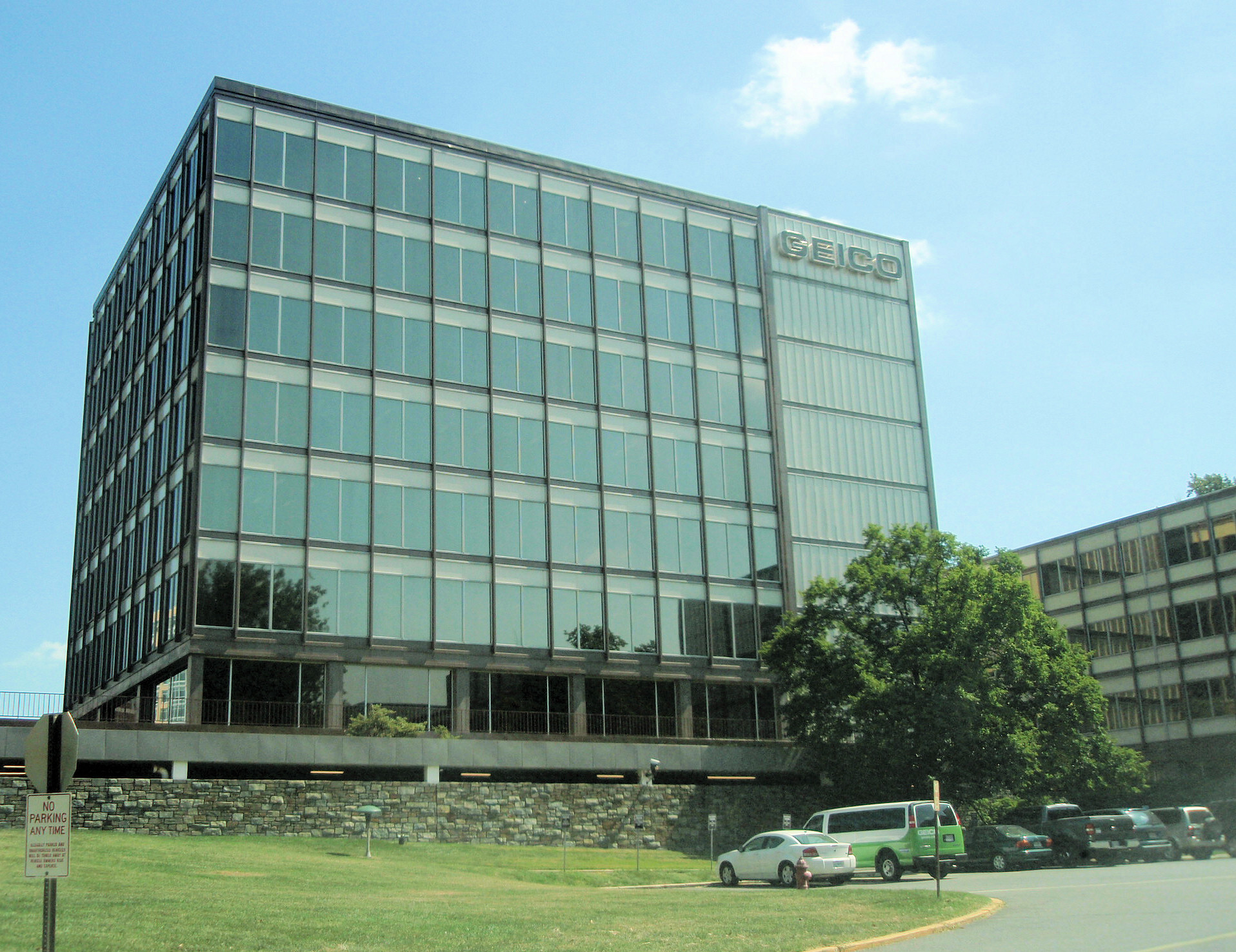
- GEICO prior headquarters in Chevy Chase, Maryland
- Type: Subsidiary
- Industry: Insurance
- Founded: 1936; 90 years ago San Antonio, Texas, United States
- Founders: Leo Goodwin Sr. Lillian Goodwin
- Headquarters: Bethesda, Maryland, United States
- Area served: United States
- Key people: Nancy L. Pierce (CEO)
- Products: Auto insurance
- Revenue: $35.093 billion USD (2020)
- Number of employees: 28,000+
- Parent: Berkshire Hathaway

The Government Employees Insurance Company (GEICO /ˈɡaɪkoʊ/, colloquially capitalized as Geico) is an American vehicle insurance company headquartered in Bethesda, Maryland. It is the third largest auto insurer in the United States, after State Farm and Progressive Corporation. GEICO is a wholly owned subsidiary of Berkshire Hathaway, which provides coverage for more than 24 million motor vehicles owned by more than 15 million policy holders as of 2017. GEICO writes private passenger automobile insurance in all 50 U.S. states and the District of Columbia. The insurance agency sells policies through local agents over the phone directly to the consumer via licensed insurance agents, and through their website. Its mascot is a gold dust day gecko with a Cockney accent, voiced by English actor Jake Wood. GEICO is well known in popular culture for its advertising.

Despite the presence of the word "government" in its name, GEICO has always been a private corporation and not a government agency or a government-owned corporation. Leo Goodwin Sr. and his wife Lillian Goodwin originally founded the company in 1936 to sell auto insurance to federal government employees.

GEICO manages the policies as the "insurance agent" and has a separate customer care team that handles the property and umbrella policies.

== History ==
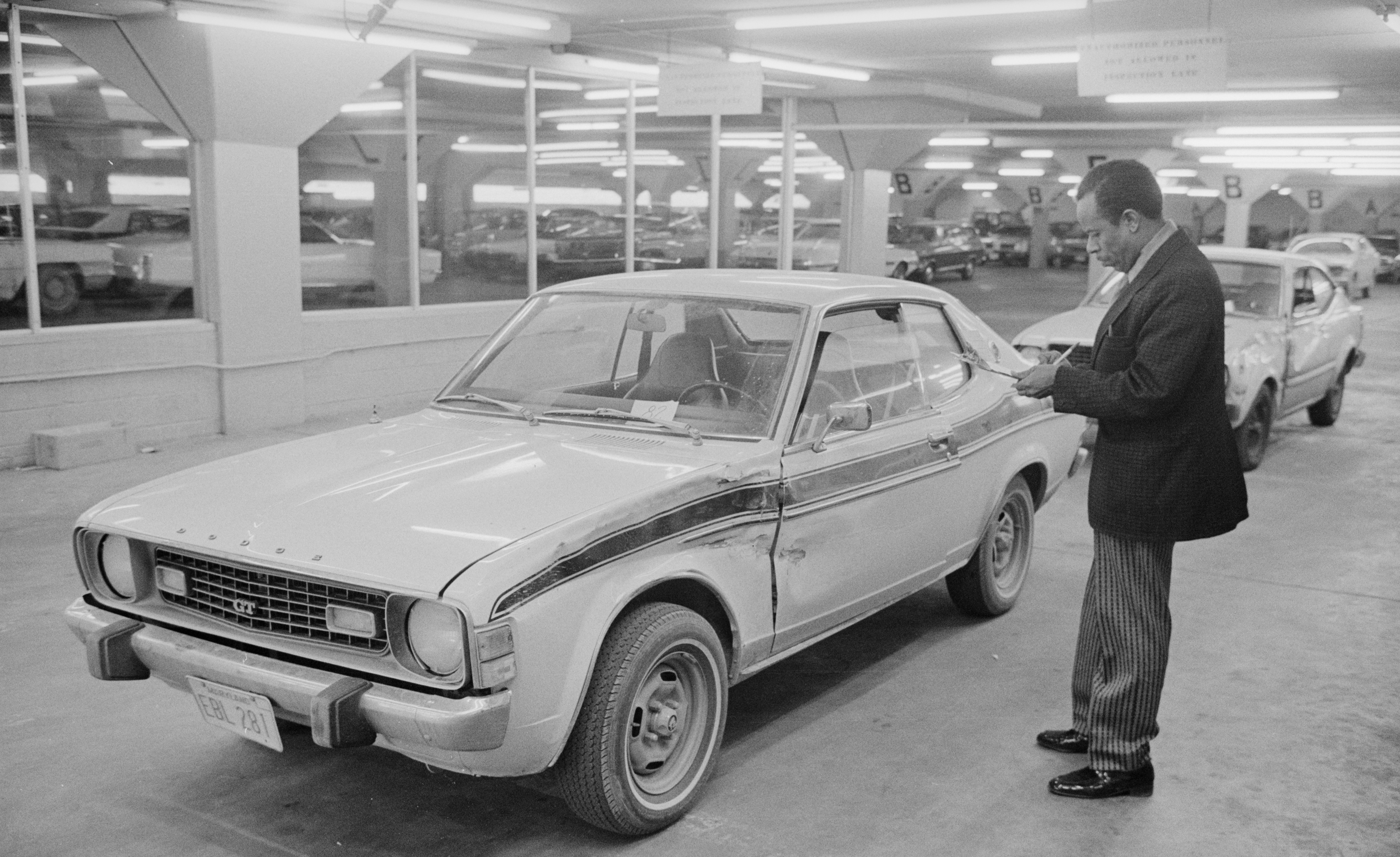
GEICO employee assessing damage to a Dodge Colt in 1976

GEICO was founded in 1936 by Leo Goodwin Sr. and his wife Lillian Goodwin to provide auto insurance directly to federal government employees and their families. Since 1925, Goodwin had worked for USAA, an insurer that specialized in insuring only military personnel. He decided to start his own company after rising as far as a civilian could go in USAA's military-dominated hierarchy. The Goodwins funded the creation of GEICO with $25,000 of their own money and $75,000 from Fort Worth, Texas-based banker Cleaves Rhea, with legal assistance from future GEICO CEO Lorimer Davidson.

In 1937, the Goodwins relocated GEICO from San Antonio, Texas, to Washington, D.C., and reincorporated the company as a D.C. corporation after realizing that their business model would work best in the place with the highest concentration of federal employees.

In 1948, the Rhea family sold its 75% stake of GEICO to a coalition of investors, which was led by Benjamin Graham's Graham-Newman Partnership taking 50% (worth $712,000 at the time); this sale accidentally violated a SEC regulation, which forced Graham-Newman to divest a portion of their holdings in 1949, resulting in GEICO becoming a publicly traded company at ~$27/sh. Graham-Newman's investment in GEICO eventually resulted in a position worth $400 million by 1972, which was by far Graham-Newman's best investment and outperformed the rest of their portfolio combined.

In 1951, Warren Buffett, then a Columbia University graduate student under Benjamin Graham, interviewed Lorimer Davidson (then a VP) and named GEICO "The Security I Like Best". From 1948 to 1958, GEICO's market capitalization grew almost 50 times.

In 1958, Goodwin retired and was succeeded by Lorimer Davidson, who grew the company's insurance premiums at a compound rate of 16% annually from $40 million to $250 million over his tenure. Davidson retired and was replaced in 1970 by Ralph Peck (President and COO) and David Lloyd Kreeger (Chairman and CEO), who had been one of the other investors in 1948.

In 1974 under Kreeger's leadership, GEICO began to insure the general public after real-time access to computerized driving records became available throughout the United States. At this time, GEICO was briefly the fifth-largest U.S. auto insurer. By 1975, it was clear that GEICO had expanded far too rapidly (during the 1973–75 recession) when it reported a US$126.5 million loss. Kreeger retired in 1975, although he continued in his role as chairman of the executive committee until 1979 when he was named honorary chairman, and Peck left in 1976 after GEICO's share price had fallen from $42 to $5. To prevent GEICO from collapsing, a consortium of 45 insurance companies agreed to take over a quarter of its policies, and it was forced to issue a stock offering, thus diluting existing stockholders, to raise money to pay claims. It took five years – during which the company shrank significantly – and a massive reorganization led by John J. Byrne and supported substantially by Buffett, to set GEICO on the path to recovery. Alvin E. Krause, retired from GEICO, was given carte blanche by the directors to help bring about a wholesale reorganization of GEICO's underwriting operations – including promotions and dismissals. He helped nurse the insurance firm back to financial health. He was a director of the GEICO Corp. from 1978 to 1983, and was an honorary director at the time of his death. He was chairman of Criterion from 1978 to 1981. Having been with GEICO since 1938.

== Modern development ==
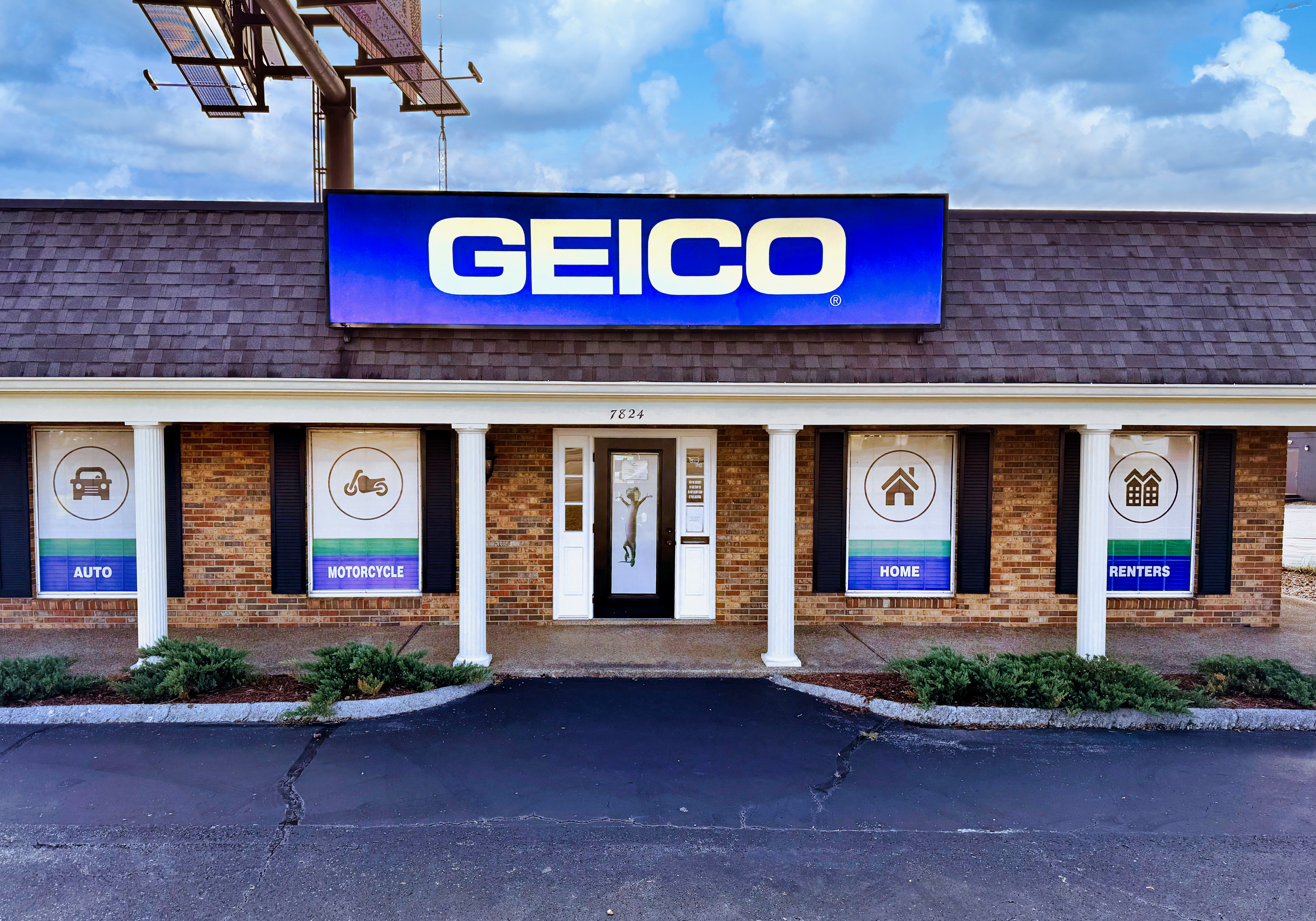
A GEICO insurance sales office in Knoxville, Tennessee

GEICO generally deals directly with consumers via telephone and internet; however, the local agent program has more than 300 independent offices across the United States. GEICO is now the second-largest writer of private auto insurance in the country.

In 2015, GEICO began offering coverage for drivers of ridesharing companies in select states, including in high-population states such as Texas, Pennsylvania, Ohio, and Georgia.

In 2016, J.D. Power rated the company #20 out of 24 for overall purchase experience, with a 2/5 score.

In April 2021, a data breach was reported to have exposed customers' driver's license numbers through GEICO's online sales application for over a month.

In October 2023, GEICO issued a return to office mandate for employees to return to their office on specific days. Many staff have been hybrid or fully remote in recent months. In addition, the insurance company announced it will lay off 2,000 staff members, or 6% of its workforce.

== Advertising campaigns ==
GEICO has many well-known ad campaigns. In 2012, GEICO spent over US$1.1 billion in advertising, or 6.8% of its revenue. GEICO ads have featured several well-known mascots, including:

- The GEICO Gecko is their most well-known spokesperson mascot. He is voiced by British actor Jake Wood currently, though other actors have been used in the past, including Andrew Randall, and Kelsey Grammer.
- The GEICO Cavemen (from ads claiming using their website is "so easy, a caveman could do it").
- Actor Mike McGlone, who uses film noir-style narration to compare the ease of GEICO to things, famous people, or idioms. ("Could switching to GEICO really save you 15% or more on car insurance?...Is having a snowball fight with pitching great Randy Johnson a bad idea?") The scene is then acted out, with typically humorous results, similar to its "Did You Know" commercials. In addition to Johnson, other ads have included Charlie Daniels, Andrés Cantor, Foghorn Leghorn, Elmer Fudd, R. Lee Ermey, and Ed "Too Tall" Jones among others.
- Maxwell the Pig: Originally from the above campaign, as the pig who cried "Wee wee wee!" from a vehicle on his way home, he later spun-off into his own series of commercials that promoted the GEICO app. GEICO reintroduced the Maxwell ad 15 years later for the 2025 NCAA Division I Men's Basketball Tournament.
- The "money savers" campaign enlisted actors to portray average consumers who have resorted to various humorous extremes in order to save money, such as teaching a dog to sing or teaching a group of Guinea pigs to row a boat and perform some mundane task for the consumer, and then presented switching to GEICO as an easy alternative to such endeavors with the common line ".... there's an easier way to save money."
- The "Happier Than...." duo features Jimmy (actor Timothy Ryan Cole) and Ronnie (musician Alex Harvey) playing a guitar and a mandolin, respectively, on a small portable stage. They comment on a fictitious preceding event, such as a man dressed in 15th-century attire laughing as he leads a trio of speed boats with the painted names Niña, Pinta, and Santa Maria. After cutting to the duo, one says to the other, "You know, folks who save hundreds of dollars by switching to GEICO sure are happy." The other then replied, "How happy are they, (Jimmy/Ronnie)?" and in the case above, the response is "Happier than Christopher Columbus with speedboats!" This series is known for its viral "Hump Day" ad, showing a camel in an office.
- Kash, the stack of cash that represents the money insurance customers could have saved by switching to GEICO. "Somebody's Watching Me" would play in the background.

There are also GEICO ads that feature stories from GEICO customers about situations in which the company assisted them, but are translated by celebrities like Little Richard and Joan Rivers. Film trailer announcer Don LaFontaine appeared in one such ad, shortly before his death. The tag announcer for these spots was D. C. Douglas. GEICO is also an official sponsor of the National Hockey League and themed commercials that always feature members of the hometown Washington Capitals.

== Motorsports ==
=== NASCAR ===
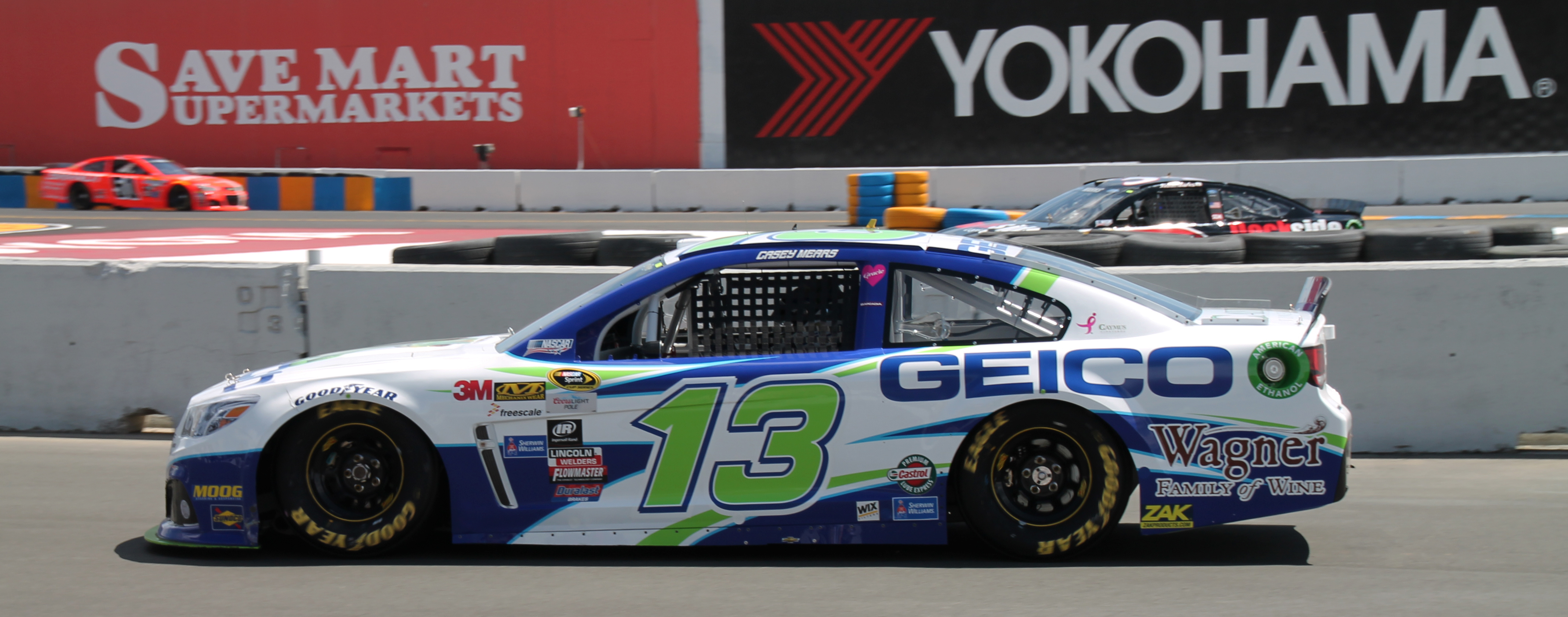
No. 13 GEICO Chevrolet SS driven by Casey Mears during 2015 Toyota/Save Mart 350 qualifying

GEICO has long been involved in motorsports sponsorship. Since 2008, the company has sponsored the Germain Racing team, first in the NASCAR Nationwide Series with Mike Wallace, and later in the NASCAR Cup Series with Max Papis and Casey Mears. Ty Dillon, grandson of racing legend Richard Childress, began driving the No. 13 GEICO Chevrolet in the 2017 season. In 2020, GEICO became a premier partner of the Cup Series, sharing title sponsorship rights with Busch Beer, Coca-Cola, and Xfinity. Germain and GEICO split at the end of 2020.

On September 20, 2024, it was announced that the 2024 NASCAR Cup Series would be the final season for GEICO as a premier partner of the Cup Series.

=== Pro Pulling League ===
GEICO also has presence in the PPL (Pro Pulling League) sponsoring Joe Eder and his Super Modified pulling tractor.

=== Speed boat racing ===
Orange County Choppers built one of their fastest bikes when they created a racing bike for a speed boat racer sponsored by the company. The Miss GEICO bike was featured in the 2018 Season 11 of American Chopper.

== Lawsuits ==
In October 2015, the Consumer Federation of California successfully sued the company for US$6 million after alleged discrimination based on occupation, education level, and other personal characteristics.

In October 2015, the United States Court of Appeals for the 11th Circuit upheld a verdict against the company for over US$700,000 in a breach of contract suit.

In November 2015, a jury in Miami awarded a family US$14.5 million after suing the company for insurance bad faith.

In December 2016, a federal Miami jury awarded US$2.7 million to a family who sued the company, claiming the company acted in bad faith.

In May 2019, the California Court of Appeal for the Second District affirmed a US$1 million judgment for punitive damages in an insurance bad faith action against GEICO (specifically, bad faith refusal to settle). This was in addition to an award of $313,000 in compensatory damages (which GEICO had not challenged on appeal).

In June 2022, a Missouri woman was awarded US$5.2 million after she sued the company, alleging that she had contracted a sexually transmitted disease through having sex in a car insured by GEICO. In January 2023, the Supreme Court of Missouri unanimously overturned the judgment and remanded the case for further proceedings because the lower courts had not given GEICO an adequate opportunity to intervene in the case to protect its interests.

== See also ==
- List of United States insurance companies
