= Gerling-Konzern =

German insurance company

- Type: Private
- Industry: Insurance
- Founded: 4 May 1904
- Defunct: July 2006
- Successor: Talanx Group
- Headquarters: Cologne, Germany

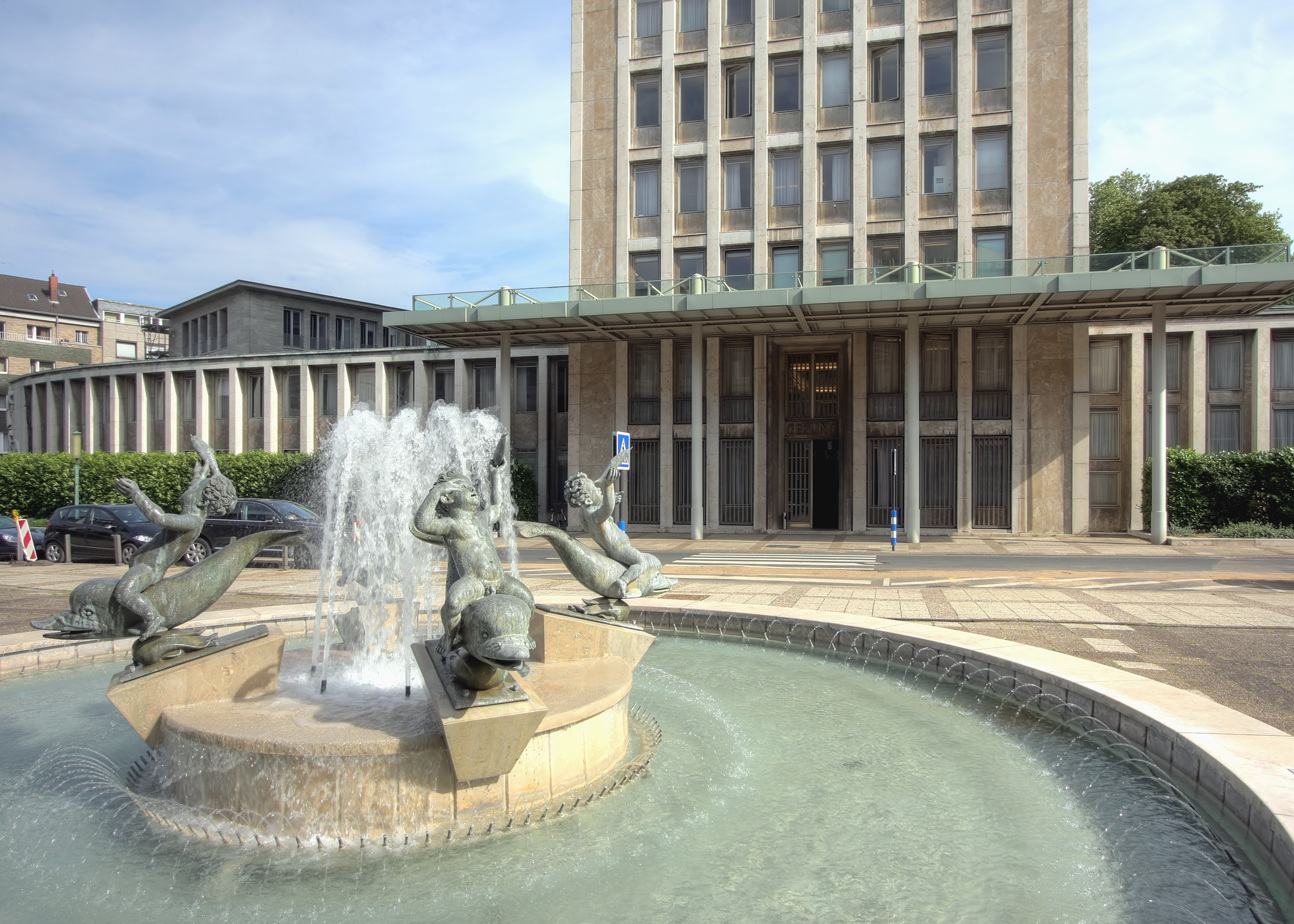
Gereonshof

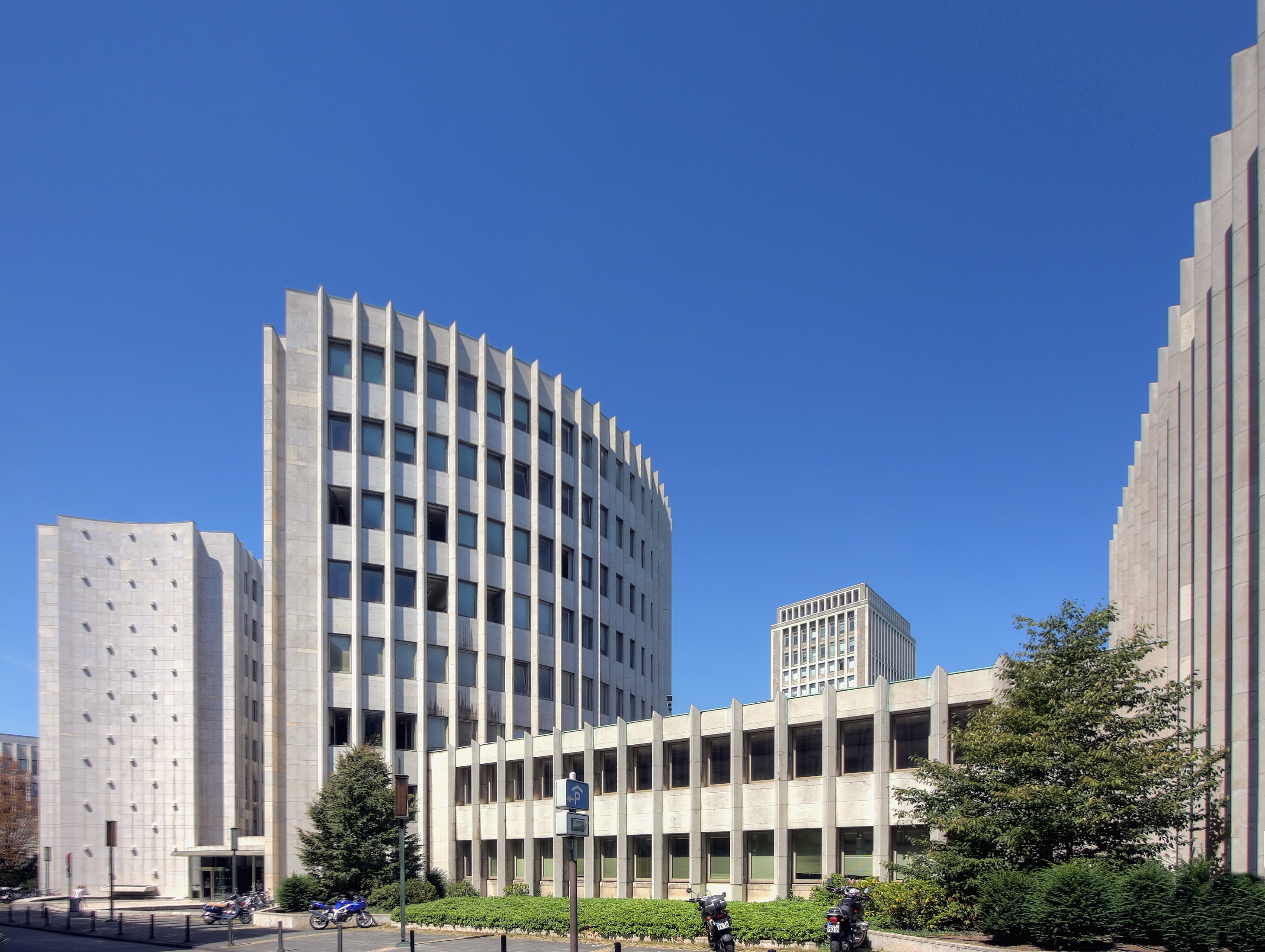
Former Gerling company headquarters in Cologne

The Gerling-Konzern, also known as the Gerling Group, was an internationally operating Cologne-based multi-line insurance company that was taken over in April 2006 by the Hanover-based Talanx Group, brand name HDI Haftpflichtverband der Deutschen Industrie, Germany's third largest insurance group. The group was fully integrated into HDI.

At the beginning of 2016, Gerling also disappeared as a brand after HDI-Gerling became "HDI Global SE". The Cologne headquarters around the (former) Gereonshof street was converted into residential and commercial space as the Gerling quarter.

In 2005 the Gerling Insurance Group employed around 6400 people in over twenty countries around the world. The premium income recently amounted to approx. 4.56 billion euros, the profit amounted to 158 million euros, after the previous years had been rather loss-making.

== History ==
The Gerling Group was shaped primarily by three generations of the Gerling family, the company founder Rudolf Gerling, his son Hans Gerling and grandson Rolf Gerling.

=== Robert Gerling ===
Robert Gerling founded together with the underwear manufacturer Wilhelm Marum the Central Insurance Office Robert Gerling & Co. Ges. M. B. (Centrale für Versicherungswesen Robert Gerling & Co. Ges. m. b. H.) in Cologne on 11 March 1904. H., and the Insurance Bureau Robert Gerling & Co. GmbH (Bureau für Versicherungswesen Robert Gerling & Co. GmbH) on 4 May 1904. Gerling and Marum also registered, on 5 December 1904, Rheinischer Insured Association (Rheinischer Versicherten-Verband) to advise policyholders.

On 23 October 1909 Gerling founded a fire insurance company, Rheinische Feuerversicherungs-AG, which collaborated with Kronprinz Versicherungs-AG, merging with it in December 1936. In early 1914, Marum resigned from the insurance bureau. In January 1917 Robert Gerling founded a second reinsurance company Rheinische Versicherungsbank AG

=== Hans Gerling ===
In an agreement dated 12 July 1934 Robert Gerling transferred the shares in the Gerling Group to his eldest son Hans, but retained the voting rights until his death. After Robert Gerling died shortly afterwards in January 1935 as a result of acute pneumonia, he did not leave his three sons a legally valid will. Non-family member Walter Forstreuter becomes CEO. In the years that followed, his descendants quarreled in numerous wills before they reached a settlement in April 1958. His son Hans Gerling only took over the management of the company in 1945.

=== Walter Forstreuter and the Nazi years ===
After Robert Gerling's death, Walter Forstreuter took over management of the company throughout the Nazi years. After the end of the war, Forsteuter resigned and Hans Gerling, son of the company's founder, took over. However, according to Senate Subcommittee Testimony in 1946, the retirement of Dr. W. S. Kisskalt, vice president of the Munich, from the board of the Union in 1939 could not save the company from being blacklisted, nor did the retirement of Mr. W. Forstreuter of Berlin, Robert Gerling of Cologne, and Hans Harney of Duesseldorf prevent the blacklisting of the Universale of Zurich as a subsidiary of the Gerling concern.

According to the Senate Subcommittee Hearings on the "Elimination of German Resources for War", the role of Gerling and the many subsidiaries Gerling controlled under different names throughout Europe was a concern. In Holland:

- Three of the four professional reinsurance companies in Holland were in Axis hands.
- The Universeele was 100% owned by the Francona of Berlin,
- and the Duitsche-Nederland was an internal reinsurance office of the Gerling Konzern of Cologne.

After 1939, Munich and Gerling had continued to control Union Reinsurance Co. of Zurich, and Universale Insurance Co. of Zurich and were consequently blacklisted by the British. After France fell to the Nazis, Gerling maintained a presence in all the major French ports. A marine-insurance pool which, since 1941, functions on a corporate basis by establishing a marine-insurance exchange somewhat along Lloyd's principles, was hurriedly set up after the armistice, and backed by German reinsurance facilities. German and Italian offices were opened in all important ports, the Gerling Konzern has representatives at Bordeaux and Le Havre, Aachen-Munich at Bordeaux, Havre, and Nantes, and the Italian Vittoria all along the Mediterranean coast. Premiums collected during the Nazi occupation of France were, the Senate testimony stated, transferred to Gerling. The portfolios of Le Recours, Paris; Lloyds, London; Norwich Union, Norwich, were transferred to Gerling, Cologne.

Hans Gerling negotiated with the Allied occupation authorities for permission to operate Gerling Konzern, and OMGUS has a complex 140 page file concerning the Nazi-era activities of the Gerling Konzern and its many subsidiaries which it investigated from 1945 to 1949.

=== Postwar ===
Since the 1930s, the insurance company has continuously expanded its premises at Von-Werth-Straße 14. In the 1950s, with the participation of the architects Hentrich and Heuser, the office buildings in the direction of Gereonshof (near Friesenplatz) were extended in a complex manner. The completion of the Gerling high-rise in Cologne's Gereonsviertel on 25 January 1953 set an urban development accent. At the instigation of Hans Gerling, Arno Breker, Hitler's favorite sculptor, contributed to the design. Until the 1980s, what was soon to be known as the Gerling complex was gradually expanded into a separate district in the direction of Friesenstrasse.

Hans Gerling founded Gerling Speziale Kreditversicherungs-AG on 20 April 1954, which initially operated trade credit, surety and fidelity insurance. After Hans Gerling's childhood friend Iwan David Herstatt acquired the Cologne-based bank Hocker & Co. on 2 June 1955; Gerling made a contribution of DM 5 million as a limited partner (81.4%, the rest was held by subsidiaries of Gerling -Group) at the bank, which has been operating as "Bankhaus ID Herstatt KGaA" since 10 December 1955. Due to the majority stake, the Herstatt Bank was a subsidiary of the Gerling Group. As a result of incorrect speculation by the Herstatt Bank, it collapsed in June 1973 Bank depositors were wiped out in what Time magazine called "the most disastrous German banking collapse since the turmoil of the '30". On 26 June 1974 the Federal Banking Supervisory Office withdrew the Herstatt Bank's banking license.

In July 1973, the investigative journalist Günter Wallraff went undercover in Gerling for two months as a porter and house messenger and reported on "anachronistic working conditions, arbitrary termination, and whims of the noble superiors to whom the 'little employees' in the patriarchal insurance company were at the mercy".

In December 1974, under public pressure, Gerling had to pledge 51% of the shares in his group to the Deutsche Bank as collateral, an insurance holding company of Deutsche Industrie (VHDI) consisting of 59 industrial companies - of which Friedrich Karl Flick was the majority shareholder - acquired 25.9%, the remaining 25.1% of the shares were taken over by Zurich Insurance Company. The sale brought 210 million DM into the comparative assets of the Herstatt bank, which Gerling paid voluntarily to enable a compulsory settlement. In February 1978, Zurich sold its shares to VHDI. In 1985 Flick held 51% of Gerling Insurance Co. After Gerling bought back a total of 88.8% of the shares in VHDI in January 1986 and the pledge was dissolved again, he regained control of the Gerling Group.

=== Rolf Gerling ===
After Hans Gerling's death in August 1991, his son Rolf Gerling took over the company as the sole heir Credit insurer Gerling NCM were sold. Rolf Gerling now held 94% of the Gerling Group, and Chairman of the Supervisory Board Joachim Theye 6%.

In October 2001, the Gerling Ring-Karree near the Friesenplatz, based on a design by the architect Sir Norman Foster, was completed and occupied near the company's headquarters at Gereonshof.

=== Sale to Talanx ===
On 8 November 2005 it was officially announced that the Talanx insurance group would take over the operating companies of the Gerling Group for a purchase price of around €1.4 billion. On 25 April 2006 Talanx and Gerling announced that all approvals for the takeover by Talanx had been obtained and that the so-called closing could take place at the end of April 2006, thus completing the takeover. This ended the family history of the Gerling Group.

Björn Jansli resigned from his office on 1 May 2006. The new management spokesman is Herbert K. Haas. From November 2006 to the beginning of 2011, the investment company, previously called Gerling Investment GmbH, operated under the name AmpegaGerling. AmpegaGerling now operates under the name Ampega Investment GmbH. Gerling Lebensversicherungs AG (GKL) was also renamed HDI-GERLING Lebensversicherung. Today it operates under the name HDI Lebensversicherung AG.

The life insurance division and the property and legal expenses insurance division were consolidated and relocated to Hanover in July 2006. As part of the nationwide restructuring, there was official talk in July 2006 of downsizing by up to 1,800 employees. The new owner Talanx sold the Gerling building in Cologne's Gereonsviertel to Frankonia Eurobau AG in December 2006. From 2010 they were redesigned into an exclusive residential complex under the name Gerling-Quartier. New premises for the life insurance sector were moved into the renovated Rheinhallen at the Cologne-Deutz exhibition center in September 2009. The Gerling Quarter was sold in September 2012 by Frankonia Eurobau AG to the previous 50% shareholder Immofinanz.

When HDI-Gerling Industrie Versicherung AG was renamed HDI Global SE, the name Gerling finally disappeared from the insurance industry in January 2016.

=== Herbert K. Haas ===
The Chairman-Supervisory Board for Talanx AG is Herbert K Haas. Haas is also Chairman-Supervisory Board of HDI Haftpflichtverband der Deutschen Industrie VVaG, Chairman-Supervisory Board at HDI-Gerling Firmen und Privat Versicherung AG, Chairman-Supervisory Board at HDI-Gerling Sach Serviceholding AG, Chairman-Supervisory Board at HDI Deutschland AG, Chairman-Supervisory Board at HDI-Gerling Leben Betriebsservice GmbH, and Chairman-Management Board at Gerling-Konzern Allgemeine Versicherungs AG (which are all subsidiaries of HDI Haftpflichtverband der Deutschen Industrie VVaG).

== Holocaust-related lawsuits ==
=== Insurance ===
Under the Nazis, Jewish holders of insurance policies were not paid by insurance companies, including Gerling. Several states passed laws demanding transparency for actions undertaken by German insurance companies between 1933 and 1945, and Gerling initiated lawsuits to challenged the laws in Florida and California.

- Gerling Global Reinsurance v. Gallagher; Gerling challenged Florida's Holocaust Victims Insurance Act, Fla. Stat. § 626.9543; Insurers operating in Florida with corporate affiliations to German insurers who may have issued policies to Holocaust victims prior to 1945 alleged that the Act violates the Due Process Clause and other provisions of the U.S. Constitution.
- Gerling Global Reinsurance v. Quackenbush: In October 1999, California enacted the Holocaust Victim Insurance Relief Act ("HVIRA"). See Cal. Ins. Code §§ 13800-13807 and accompanying regulations, Cal. Code Regs. Tit. 10 §§ 2278-2278.5. The stated purpose of the HVIRA is for insurance companies doing business in the State of California to ensure that "any involvement they or their related companies may have had with insurance policies of Holocaust victims are disclosed to the state and to ensure the rapid resolution of these questions, eliminating further victimization of these policyholders and their families." Cal. Ins. Code § 13801(e). Gerling filed suit to challenge the law.
- Gerling Global Reinsurance Corp. v. Low: Plaintiffs are three insurance companies and one trade organization of insurance companies who do business in California. They sued the California Commissioner of Insurance (Commissioner) seeking declaratory and injunctive relief to bar enforcement of the Holocaust Victim Insurance Relief Act of 1999 (HVIRA), Cal. Ins. Code §§ 13800-13807 (1999).

=== Aryanization ===
In 2006 the German weekly magazine Der Spiegel published an article about the Aryanization of three properties that had been owned by Jewish owners and that were currently owned by the Dumont Schauberg publishing dynasty. Dumont successfully demanded that Der Spiegel retract the allegations from the article "Klüngeln im Krieg" saying that the allegation that the DuMont publishing family had profited from "Aryanization" during the Nazi era was untrue. Neven-Dumont pointed out that Gabriele Neven DuMont bought the land on 23 March 1941, three years after the Gerling Group had acquired the land from the Jewish Brandenstein family, paying RM 255,000, more than five times the amount that Gerling had paid in 1938.

== Business areas ==
According to the company, the Gerling Insurance Group was one of the market leaders among industrial insurers in Europe and one of the leading providers of company pension schemes in Germany. The business areas included insurance and financial services for large commercial companies, small and medium-sized companies as well as freelancers and private individuals. Other services included risk analysis and advice as well as asset management.

== Miscellaneous ==
The Gerling Group had an art collection that comprised around 4,500 pictures in 2008. The works that have been purchased for the Gerling Ring-Karree are mostly originals as well as high-quality photographs and some graphics. Of the art in the Ring-Karree, 20 percent came from established artists and 80 percent was acquired by young artists in the last two years.

== See also ==
- International Commission on Holocaust Era Insurance Claims
- American Insurance Ass'n v. Garamendi
