= Adolf Baeumker =

German officer and aviation researcher

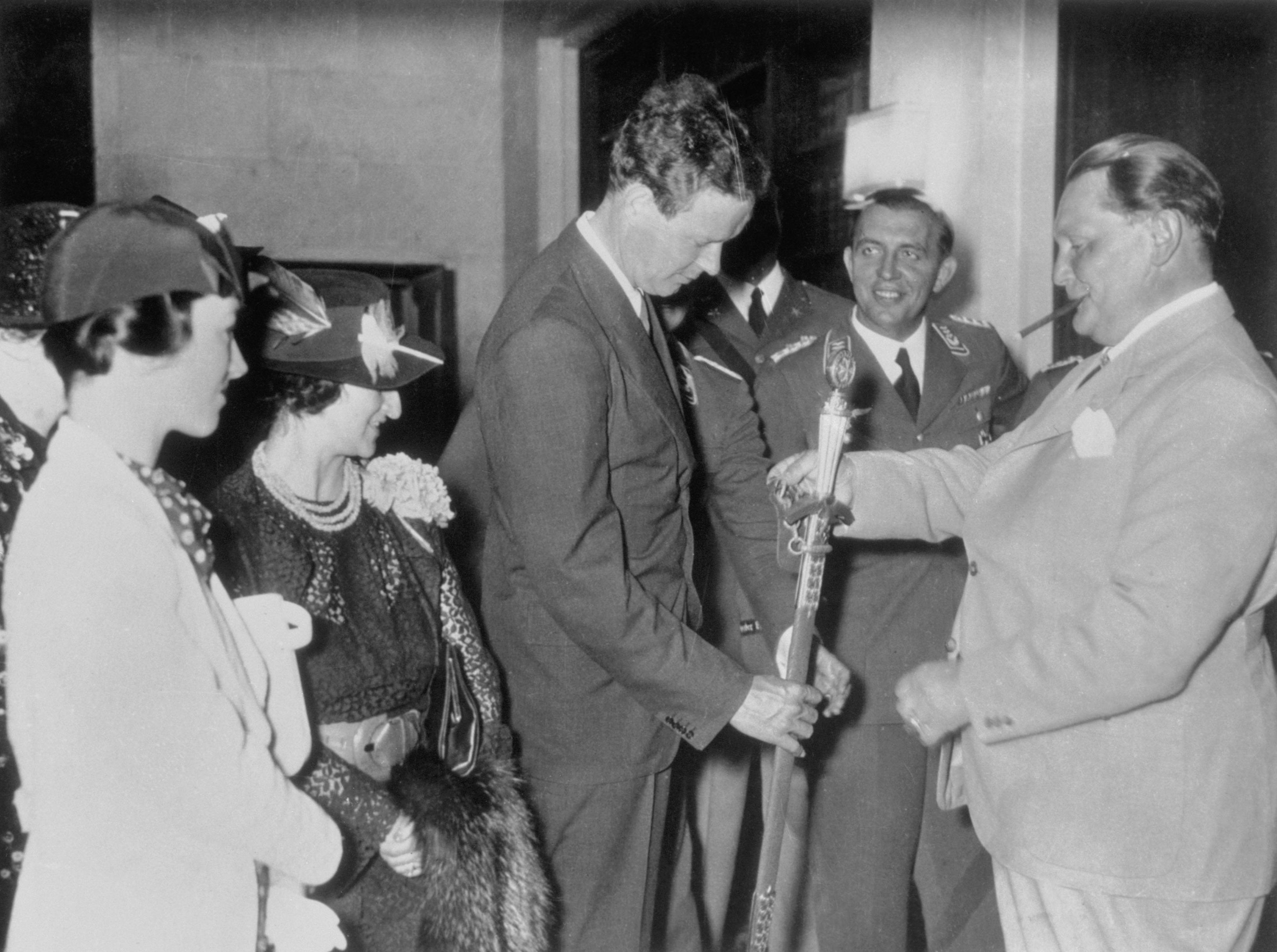
- Aldolf Baeumker looks on as Göring presents Lindbergh with the Order of the German Eagle (October 1938)
- Born: July 14, 1891; Breslau, German Empire
- Died: March 4, 1976 (aged 84); Bad Godesberg, Germany
- Occupation: German aviation researcher
- Political party: NSDAP (Nazi party)

Adolf Georg Heinrich Klemens Vinzenz Baeumker (July 14, 1891 – March 4, 1976) was a German officer. From the 1920s to the 1950s, he was an official of various military and civil aviation research institutions.

== Life ==
The son of a philosophy professor began his military career in the Prussian Army in 1908. After attending the military school in Glogau, he was deployed to the air force in the First World War. From 1920 to 1927 he worked for the Reichswehr Ministry, from 1924 as a consultant for technical questions of armament in the air force. In 1927, he was promoted to the rank of Rittmeister from military service and was until 1932 consultant for research and development of aviation in the Reich Ministry of Transport, from 1931 with the civil rank of a senior government councilor.

== Nazi era ==
Baeumker joined the Nazi party in 1933. From 1933 to 1941 he was head of the Aviation Research and Development Department at the Reichswehr Ministry, from 1938 he was the ministerial director. He played a key role in the expansion and development of German aviation research institutes, founded the "Association for Aviation Research" in 1933, the "Lilienthal Society for Aviation Research" two years later, and in 1936 the "German Academy of Aviation Research". Baeumker was chancellor of this academy from 1937. On his initiative, the "Central for Scientific Reporting of Aviation Research of the General Aircraft Master (ZWB)" was founded in Berlin-Adlershof on November 1, 1933; it was not only a documentation center for specialist literature, but also played an important role in authorizing publications.

The US National Advisory Committee for Aeronautics (NACA) monitored Europe's engine technology improvements not focusing on national security. In March 1936, John J. Ide of the NACA, reported greatly expanded aeronautical research in England, France, Italy, and Germany. In May, Charles Lindbergh reported on how Europe's progress could affect the United States. In August, George Lewis accepted an invitation to cross the Atlantic on the airship Hindenburg as guest of the Deutsche Zeppelin-Reederei. Ames directed Lewis to evaluate aeronautical research in Germany and Russia. In September 1936, George Lewis visited Germany to evaluate German aeronautical facilities. Lewis discovered Dr. Adolf Baeumker's, head of government aeronautical research in Germany, large scale funding and staffing. Baeumker reported directly to Hermann Goering with almost limitless funds for aeronautical laboratories. Lewis reported on the Germans' long-range research program. German aeronautical facilities were directed to spare no expense to increase aircraft speeds. Much of the research equipment had been modeled on the NACA's; when Baeumker first visited Goering, he had taken with him as a conversation piece a photograph of the NACA full-scale wind tunnel, and Goering decided on the spot to build one for Germany. In 1936, Lewis believed "that the equipment at Langley Field is equal to or better than the equipment in the German research laboratories." "But," he continued, "the personnel of the German research laboratories is [sic] larger in number, and the engineers have had an opportunity of having special training, which has not been afforded to many of our own engineers." Lewis estimated that one German lab employed 1600 to 2000 persons compared with the 350 then at Langley.

In 1938, at the request of the United States military, Charles Lindbergh traveled to Germany to evaluate German aviation. At a dinner hosted by the US ambassador to Germany Hugh Wilson, Lindbergh was presented the Order of the German Eagle by Germany's air chief, Hermann Göring, in attendance was Anne Lindbergh, Evangeline Lindbergh, and German aviation figures: Ernst Heinkel, Adolf Baeumker, and Willy Messerschmitt.

Baeumker was also instrumental in the history and the emergence of the engineering school for aviation technology (IFL). In 1942, he became chairman of the Munich aviation research institute, and for the last three years of the war he had been part of the Luftwaffe's research leadership. He also did his doctorate at the Ludwig-Maximilians-Universität München in 1944.

In 1941, he became an honorary citizen of the Technical University of Munich.[1]

== Postwar ==
After 1945, Baeumker worked in the United States as a consultant to the US Air Force in Baltimore and was granted American citizenship in 1954. In 1958, he was transferred to the headquarters of the American Air Force in Europe in Wiesbaden, where he worked as a consultant for German and American military command posts. From 1959 he was a member of the board of trustees of the German Society for Aviation Sciences.

In 1961, he received the Great Cross of Merit. Since 1967 he lived as Rittmeister and ministerial conductor in Bad Godesberg, where he died in 1976.

== Selected works ==
Advice to the authorities from outside experts. Explained using the example of German and American aviation. Comments on a topic of state management (= long-term planning of research and development, No. 40) Bad Godesberg, 1970

Thoughts on Problems of Change in Power (= Long-Term Planning of Research and Development, No. 32) Bad Godesberg, 1967

On the basic division of the top military leadership. The special German needs here (= long-term planning of research and development, No. 20). Bad Godesberg: self-published, 1964

Long-term research and development plans for defense. Bad Godesberg: self-published, 1959

== Literature ==
- Michael Grüttner : Biographisches Lexikon zur nationalsozialistischen Wissenschaftspolitik (= Studien zur Wissenschafts- und Universitätsgeschichte. Band 6), Synchron, Heidelberg 2004, ISBN 3-935025-68-8, p. 18.
- Literature by and about Adolf Baeumker in the catalog of the German National Library
- Wolfgang A. Herrmann (ed.): Technische Universität München : die Geschichte eines Wissenschaftsunternehmens. Volume 2, Metropol, Berlin 2006, ISBN 978-3-938690-34-5, p. 989.

Norm data (person): GND : 120662795 | LCCN : no95034168 | VIAF : 47597868 | Wikipedia people search
