= Leo Goodwin Sr. =

American businessman

- Born: 1886; Lowndes, Missouri, US
- Died: 1971 (aged 84-85)
- Occupation: Insurance businessman
- Years active: 1936-1958 (retired)
- Known for: Co-founder of GEICO
- Spouse: Lillian Goodwin
- Children: Leo Goodwin Jr.
- Awards: Insurance Hall of Fame

Leo Goodwin Sr. (1886–1971) was an American businessman and philanthropist best known for founding private auto insurance company GEICO in 1936, with his wife Lillian Goodwin.

== Biography ==
Goodwin was born in 1886 in Lowndes, Missouri, the son of a country doctor who traveled by horse and buggy to treat his patients.

Educated as an accountant, Goodwin entered the insurance business in San Antonio, Texas.

== Professional career and GEICO ==
Using this then unique business model, Goodwin co–founded the Government Employees Insurance Company (GEICO) in 1936.

With his wife, Lillian, Goodwin worked 12 hours a day for little or no salary for several years to implement his business plan. In 1940, after operating in the red for several years, the company realized its first profit. In 1948, GEICO became publicly owned and, as of 2018, has assets of more than $32 billion.

Goodwin devised the basic business plan during his early career in Texas. In 1936, Goodwin established GEICO operations in Washington, D.C. By the end of 1936, there were 3,700 GEICO policies in force and a total staff of 12 people. He believed that "if he lowered costs in the company by marketing directly to carefully targeted customer groups, he'd be able to pass along lower premiums and still earn a profit". Goodwin chose to retire in 1958. In 2001, he was posthumously named to the Insurance Hall of Fame.

== Philanthropy ==
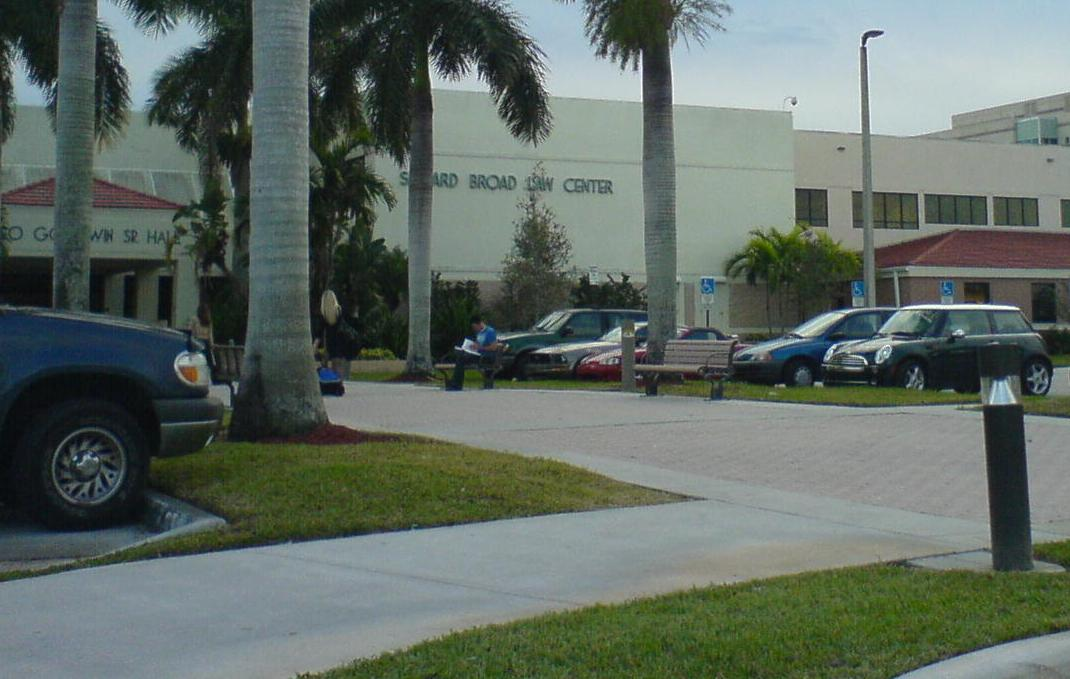
Exterior of Leo Goodwin Sr. Hall – home of Shepard Broad Law Center

Goodwin made a posthumous donation to Nova Southeastern University of some $14.5 million dollars. He is considered one of the school's primary founders.

The Leo Goodwin Sr. Chair in Law was established at the university's law school, Shepard Broad College of Law, with an initial gift from Goodwin. The building that contains the college is housed in Leo Goodwin Sr. Hall, and one of the dorms is named the Leo Goodwin Sr. Residence Hall.

The Goodwin Foundation sponsors a scholarship at Broward Community College.
