= Talanx =

German multinational financial services company

Talanx AG

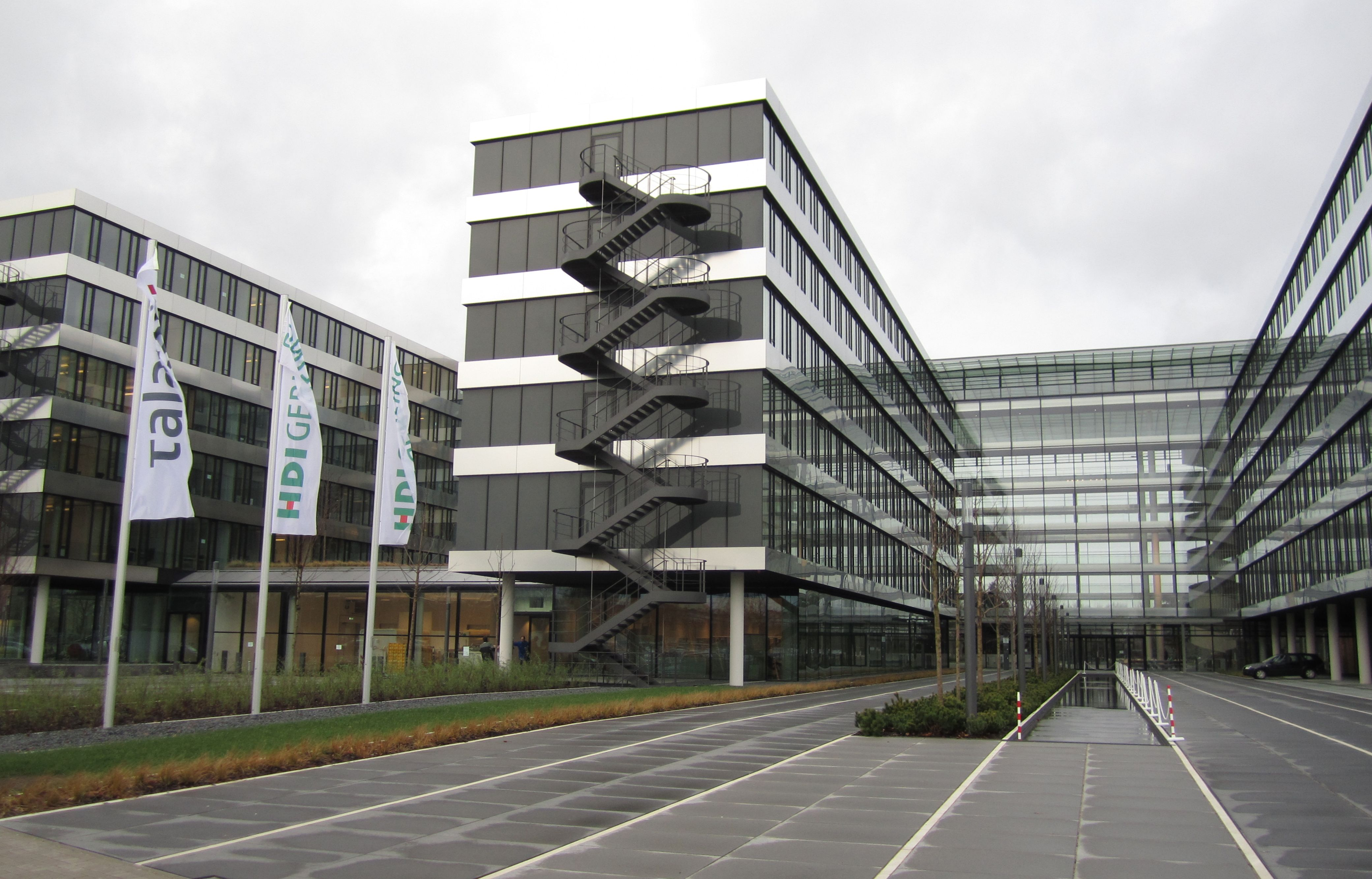
- Talanx/HDI headquarters in Hanover, Germany.
- Type: Aktiengesellschaft
- Traded as: FWB: TLX; MDAX Component
- Industry: Financial services
- Predecessor: Gerling-Konzern
- Founded: 1996; 30 years ago
- Headquarters: Hanover, Germany,
- Area served: Worldwide
- Products: Insurance, Reinsurance, asset management
- Revenue: €43.6 billion (2020)
- Operating income: €2.4 billion (EBIT) (2020)
- Net income: €923 million (2020)
- Total assets: €193 billion (2020)
- Number of employees: 23,324 (2020)
- Parent: HDI Haftpflichtverband der Deutschen Industrie
- Subsidiaries: Ampega Investment GmbH; CiV Life; Hannover Re; HDI Haftpflichtverband der Deutschen Industrie neue leben PB Versicherungen; Posta Biztosító; Talanx Asset Management GmbH; Talanx Immobilien Management GmbH; TARGO Versicherungen; WARTA
- Website: www.talanx.com

Talanx is a German multinational financial services company headquartered in Hanover, Germany. Its core businesses include reinsurance, insurance and asset management. Talanx is Germany's third-largest insurance group and one of the major European insurance groups by premium income. The group operates in more than 150 countries.

The Talanx Group operates as a multi-brand provider with a focus on B2B insurance. It Is a constituent of the MDAX, trading index of German mid-cap companies.

== Operations ==
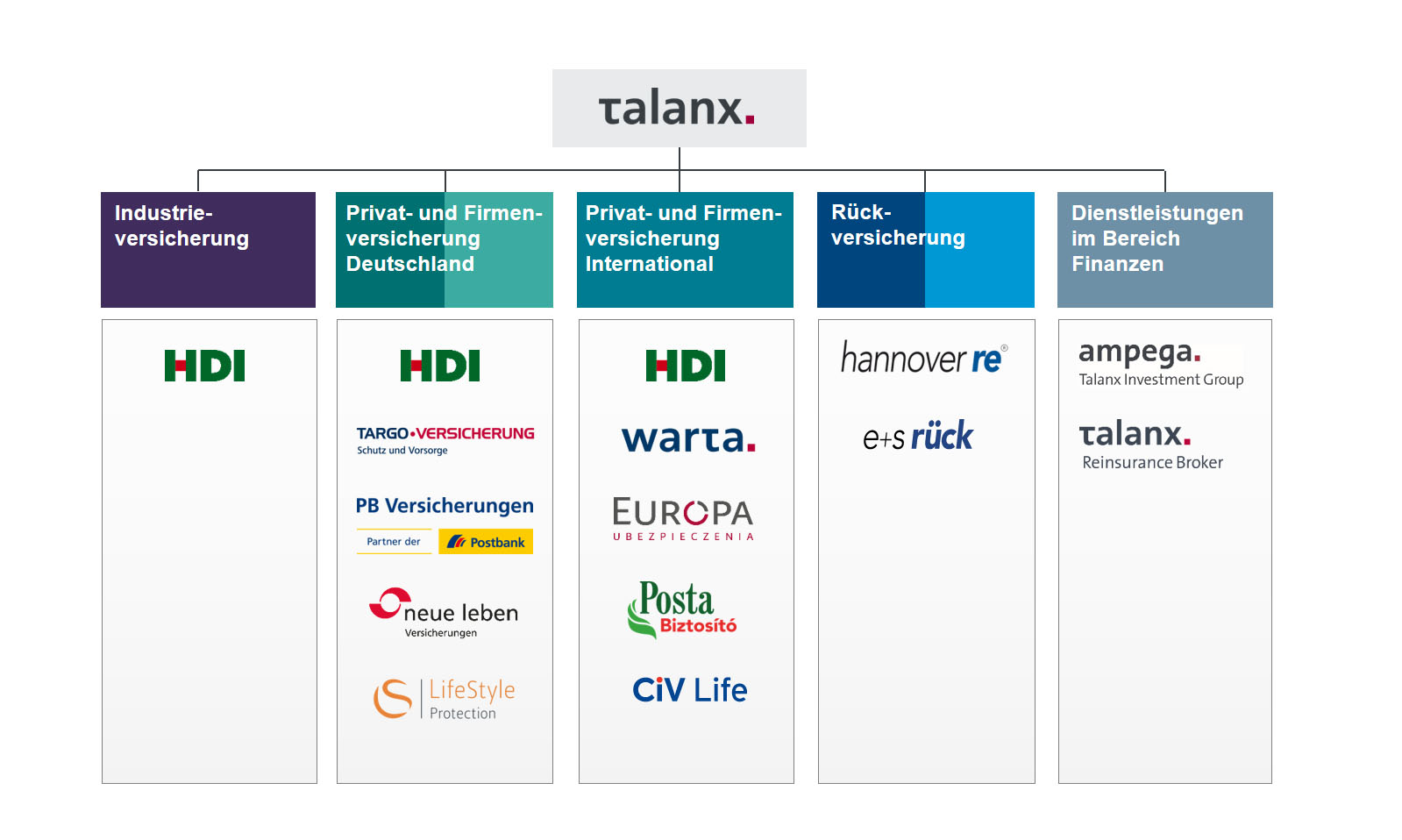
Talanx Group Structure

Talanx is headed by Talanx AG, which assumes the functions of a management and financial holding company within the Group but is not itself active in insurance business. The largest majority shareholder of Talanx AG is HDI V.a.G., a mutual insurance company. The operational insurance business is conducted by the Group companies of the Talanx Group.

The Group has tailored its structure to four operating customer segments: The business segments Industrial Insurance, Private and Commercial Lines Germany, Private and Commercial Lines International and Property/Casualty Reinsurance. In addition, the Group is active in asset management, which is anchored in the segment Corporate Functions:

- Ampega: Ampega Investment GmbH, Ampega Asset Management GmbH and Ampega Real Estate GmbH are responsible for asset management and funds provider activities aimed at institutional and private clients.
- CiV Life: CiV Life operates internationally within the Talanx Group in the private and corporate insurance sector.
- Hannover Re (Reinsurance Division): Talanx subsidiary Hannover Re (German Hannover Rück), with a gross premium of around €22.6 billion, is a European reinsurance group and third-largest reinsurance group in the world. Its headquarters is in Hannover, Germany.
- HDI Haftpflichtverband der Deutschen Industrie: German insurance for private and corporate clients through branch office and direct sales.
- LifeStyle Protection
- neue Leben: neue leben is part of the Talanx Group's Private and Commercial Insurance Germany division
- PB Insurance: As a partner of Postbank, the PB Versicherungen brand is tailored to the needs of Postbank customers.
- Posta Biztosító: Talanx cooperates with the Hungarian postal service in the bancassurance sector.
- TARGO Insurances: TARGOBANK and the Talanx Group have a long-standing bancassurance cooperation.
- TU Europa: The TU Europa Group is in the field of bancassurance in Poland.
- WARTA: WARTA, based in Warsaw, is a subsidiary of HDI International AG.

In May 2023, Talanx announced the acquisition of companies from Liberty Mutual. Talanx announced the purchase deal of Liberty Seguros personal and small commercial business in the regions of Brazil, Chile, Ecuador and Colombia, The deal is expected to make Talanx the third-largest insurer in Latin America.
