= Deepwater Horizon oil spill consequences =

Deepwater Horizon oil spill consequences may refer to:

- Economic effects of the Deepwater Horizon oil spill
- Environmental impact of the Deepwater Horizon oil spill
- Health consequences of the Deepwater Horizon oil spill
- Reactions to the Deepwater Horizon oil spill

== See also ==
- Deepwater Horizon (disambiguation)
