= Deepwater =

Ancient mention of "deop wæter" in the Beowulf

Deepwater may refer to ocean water in the abyssal zone, hadal zone, or other deep ocean zones.

Deepwater may also refer to:

== Entertainment ==
- Deepwater (film), a 2005 neo-noir film based on the novel
- Deepwater trilogy, a series of novels by Ken Catran
- Deepwater, a novel by Matthew F. Jones published in 1999

== Places ==
=== Australia ===
- Deepwater, New South Wales, a village
- Deepwater, Queensland, a locality in the Gladstone Region
- Deepwater, South Australia
- Deepwater National Park, a coastal national park in Queensland
- Deepwater River, a river in New South Wales

=== United States ===
- Deepwater, Missouri, a city in Henry County, Missouri
- Deepwater Township, Bates County, Missouri
- Deepwater, New Jersey, a community in Pennsville, New Jersey
- Deepwater Shoals Light, a lighthouse in Virginia
- Deepwater Terminal Railroad, a terminal railroad in Virginia
- Deepwater Railway, a short line railroad in West Virginia

== Other uses ==
- Deepwater drilling
- Deepwater Horizon oil spill
- Integrated Deepwater System Program, U.S. Coast Guard initiative commonly known as Deepwater

== See also ==
- Deep Water (disambiguation)
- Deepwater Horizon (disambiguation)
