= Deepwater Black =

1995 novel by Ken Catran

- Author: Ken Catran
- Series: Deepwater trilogy
- Genre: Science fiction
- Publication date: 1992

Deepwater Black is a 1992 novel, first in the Deepwater trilogy, by the New Zealand science fiction writer Ken Catran, with a cast of young characters who are supposedly stranded in space while a virus ravages Earth. The book series itself is quite different from the television series later developed. The approach of the novels focused on the characters as younger children, around 13–14, rather than the television approach, in which the characters were much older.

== Plot ==
The main plot involves a virus that breaks out and leaves the humans residing on Earth doomed. In a desperate attempt before the end, all humanity's resources are dedicated to a crash program to produce a deep space ark, capable of seeding humanity on a new world. The ship is crewed by six clones, teenage versions of people who achieved great works during the ark project, equipped with the memories of their donors. Before reaching their destination, however, the crew is awoken prematurely to face a threat to the ship, before their memories are complete. They must come to terms with the workings of the ship, the dangers faced by their ship, the realization that they are clones, and their ultimate destiny to save their race.

== TV series ==
Mission Genesis
- Genre: Science fiction
- Starring: Gordon Michael Woolvett, Nicole de Boer, Jason Cadieux
- Music by: Fred Mollin
- No. of seasons: 1
- No. of episodes: 13

Production
- Production company: YTV

Original release
- Network: Sci-Fi Channel
- Release: 21 July – 22 December 1997

The trilogy was adapted as the Sci Fi Channel's first original scripted television series in 1997 under the name Mission Genesis. The series was a co-production between YTV Network and USA Networks, and was distributed by Sunbow Entertainment. In Canada and the United Kingdom, the series retained the original title, Deepwater Black. Only one season of 13 episodes was made, and involved a relatively small cast and heavy use of CGI. Soon after production ended, lead actress Nicole de Boer joined the cast of Star Trek: Deep Space Nine and lead actor Gordon Michael Woolvett joined the cast of Andromeda.

The series was filmed in Toronto, Ontario, Canada.

Music for the series was composed and performed by Fred Mollin.

=== Cast ===
- Gordon Michael Woolvett – Reb (captain and engineer)
- Nicole de Boer – Yuna (pilot and navigator)
- Jason Cadieux – Bren (defense and weapons expert)
- Julie Khaner – Gen (onboard computer)
- Craig Kirkwood – Zak (computer and cybernetics technician)
- Sara Sahr – Lise (doctor)
- Kelli Taylor – Gret (geneticist and communications expert)

=== Episodes ===
The show only had 13 episodes before it was canceled. They were:

#	Title	Directed by	Written by	Original airdate
1.	"Awakening"	George Mendeluk	Bill Taub	21 July 1997
2.	"Lullaby"	Don McCutcheon	Jeff Copeland; Barry Pearson	28 July 1997
3.	"Legacy"	Don McCutcheon	Jeff Copeland	4 August 1997
4.	"Reflections"	George Mendeluk	Jeff Copeland; Barry Pearson	11 August 1997
5.	"Plague"	Don McCutcheon	Doug Molitor	18 August 1997
6.	"Cycles"	Don McCutcheon	Jeremy Hole	25 August 1997
7.	"Refugee"	George Mendeluk	Jeff Copeland; Barry Pearson	8 September 1997
8.	"Hunt"	Don McCutcheon	Raymond Storey	15 September 1997
9.	"Fugue"	George Mendeluk	Dennis Foon	10 November 1997
10.	"Siege"	George Mendeluk	Doug Molitor	24 November 1997
11.	"Prime"	George Mendeluk	Dennis Foon	1 December 1997
12.	"Infestation"	Don McCutcheon	Barry Pearson	15 December 1997
13.	"Aurora"	George Mendeluk	Dennis Foon	22 December 1997
