= Waterdeep (disambiguation) =

Waterdeep is a fictional city in the Forgotten Realms campaign setting for the Dungeons & Dragons role-playing game.

Waterdeep may also refer to:

- Waterdeep (band), a Christian band
- Waterdeep (module), a D&D game adventure taking place within the fictional city
- Waterdeep (novel), a D&D novel in the Avatar Series
- City of Splendors: Waterdeep, a supplement to the D&D game

== See also ==
- Lords of Waterdeep, a board game set in the fictional city
- Deepwater (disambiguation)
