= Health consequences of the Deepwater Horizon oil spill =

The wider health effects caused by the explosion and subsequent oil spill of the Deepwater Horizon offshore drilling rig are not fully known. An oil discharge continued in the Gulf of Mexico for 84 days, resulting in the largest oil spill in the history of the petroleum industry, estimated at 206 million gallons (4.9 million barrels). The spill exposed thousands of area residents and cleanup workers to risks associated with oil fumes, particulate matter from Controlled burns, volatile organic compounds (VOCs), polycylic aromatic hydrocarbons (PAHs), and heavy metals.

The spill was also notable for the volume of Corexit oil dispersant used to help disperse the oil. Although approved by the EPA, no toxicology studies had been done at this time. In 2011, a toxicology study was done and it reported 57 chemicals in the ingredients including chemicals associated with cancer, skin irritation from rashes to burns, eye irritation, potential respiratory toxins or irritants; and kidney toxins.

At the height of operations (summer of 2010), response vessels numbered about 7,000 and personnel numbered over 47,000; as of January 2013, that figure has dropped to about 935. The maximum extent of shoreline oiling involved almost 1,100 miles of shoreline and as of December 2012, approximately 339 miles of oiled shoreline remained subject to evaluation and/or cleanup operations.

Acute toxicity symptoms have been reported and the study of long-term medical and psychological effects is ongoing. As the largest marine oil spill in history, the potential for physical, psychological, and socioeconomic difficulties and long term effects remain unknown. Considering the number of residents and clean-up workers exposed, it has been seen as the most demanding on-water response in U.S. history. Only a few studies have looked at long-term health consequences, it is assumed that the spill's impacts are wide-reaching and will have long-lasting effects.

== Reports of health effects ==
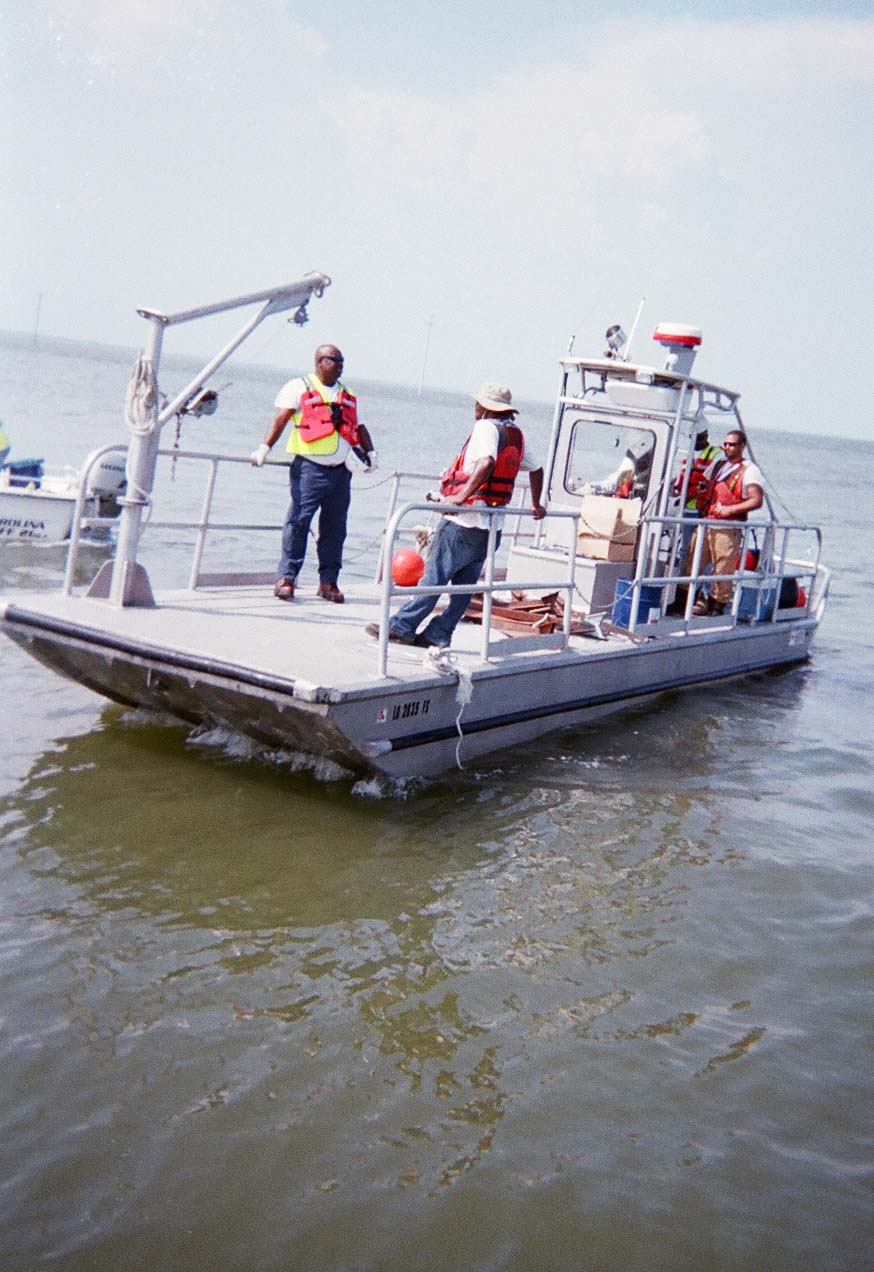
Workers return to landing off St. George Island after BP spill cleanup June, 2010

People can be exposed to the chemicals in oil by breathing them, swallowing, or touching them. Previous studies show consistent evidence of acute toxic effects, mainly neurological, ocular (eye), and respiratory, of those living in exposed communities and among clean-up workers. While the spill was ongoing the Centers for Disease Control and Prevention (CDC) reported that some residents along the coast reported smelling odors and experiencing nausea, headaches, eye, nose, and throat irritation; however, the CDC said that their tests found that air quality levels for ozone and particulates were normal on the Gulf coastline for that time of year and odor-causing pollutants associated with petroleum products were being found at low levels."

By 21 June 2010, 143 oil spill exposure cases had been reported to the Louisiana Department of Health and Hospitals; 108 of those cases involved workers in the clean-up efforts, while 35 were reported by gulf residents. Writing in The Nation, Antonia Juhasz reported that according to the health departments of Louisiana, Mississippi and Alabama, from June to September 2010, when they stopped keeping track, more than 700 people sought health services with complaints "believed to be related to exposure to pollutants from the oil spill." However, she believed the number to be much higher because in her numerous interviews covering over two years, most people did "not know to report their symptoms as related to the oil spill, nor did their physicians ask."

The National Institute for Environmental Health Sciences is sponsoring a study, "Women and Their Children's Health" (WaTCH), which will follow the health issues of 2,500 women and 800 children living along the Louisiana coast. Initial information gathered from questionnaires answered by 224 women "shows a statistically significant relationship between their reported symptoms and exposure to the spill." In the initial period of exposure, the participants reported "wheezing; tightness in chest; shortness of breath; watery, burning or itchy eyes; stuffy, itchy or runny nose; burning in nose, throat or lungs; skin rash; sore or blisters lasting at least three days; severe headaches or migraines; nausea; excessive fatigue or tiredness; diarrhea; sore throat; and being unable to concentrate."

In another study conducted by the Centers for Disease Control and the Alabama Health Department similar health effects were recorded in two coastal counties in Alabama. A Columbia University study on health effects among children in Louisiana and Florida found that more than 40% of 1,437 parents living less than 10 miles (16 km) from the coast had been directly exposed to the spill and more than a third of the parents reported physical or mental health symptoms among their children.

== Scientific evidence ==
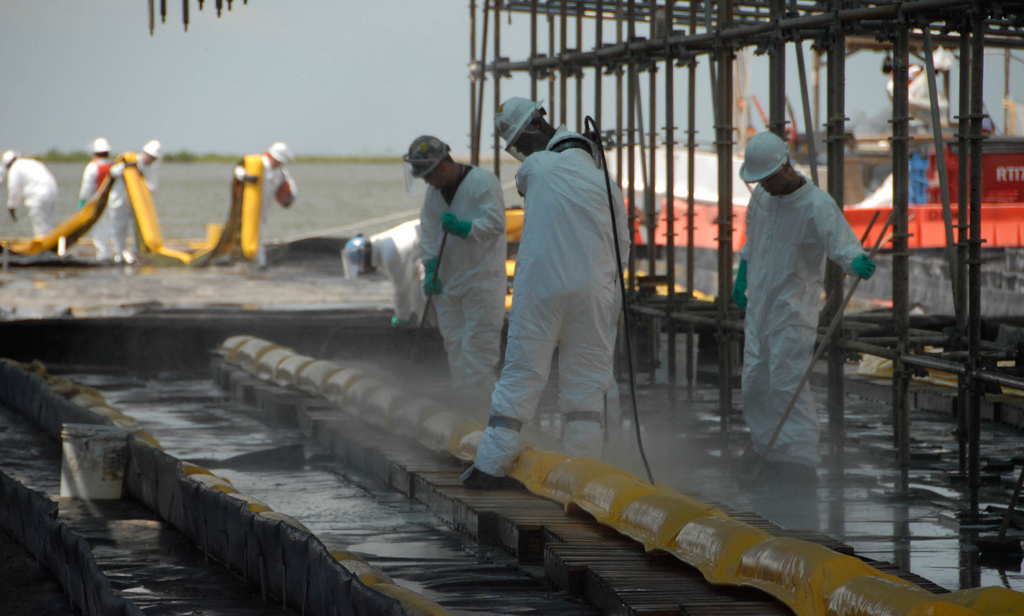
Workers performing decontamination of containment booms used during the Deepwater Horizon oil spill.

Although the spill has resulted in anecdotal evidence of sickness experienced by coastal residents and workers involved in the cleanup, scientific evidence has been scant. The spill differed from previous spills in that the leak was at the ocean floor rather than on the surface and the volume of oil spilled and the amount of dispersant used was unprecedented. The Louisiana state health officer stated, "This is more than a spill. This is ongoing leakage of a chemical, and adding chemicals to stop the chemicals. We're feeling like we're in a research lab." Moreover, the proximity to populated communities, the number of potentially exposed workers and community members, and the duration of the spill were far greater than any previously studied oil spills. Of more than 40 prior major oil spills, only 8 led to studies of health effects and only two of them included any long-term follow-up. According to the researchers at the National Institute of Environmental Health Sciences, early data from the two long-term studies "suggested that respiratory and genotoxicity effects were important to capture, as well as mental health outcomes commonly associated with disasters of this scale."

In June 2010, at the request of the US Department of Health and Human Services, the U.S. National Academies Institute of Medicine held a workshop to discuss known health effects of previous oil spills and how they might apply to the Gulf spill and to coordinate epidemiological monitoring and ongoing medical research. On the second day of the meeting the suicide of William Allen Kruse, a charter boat captain working as a BP clean-up worker, intensified previous expert commentary on the current and likely long-term mental health effects of the ongoing crisis. David Abramson, director of research for Columbia's National Center for Disaster Preparedness, noted the increased risk of mental disorders and stress-related health problems. In August, the group released their conclusions in a report, "Workshop Summary: Assessing the Effects of the Gulf of Mexico Oil Spill on Human Health".

In 2011 the Louisiana State University Health Sciences Center did a study to compare the acute health impacts of the spill with the acute health impacts reported from previous spills to predict health impacts in Louisiana as compared with the health impacts reported from prior crude oil spills. The study reported that "Acute health effects in cleanup workers mirrored those reported in cleanup workers following prior oil spills as ranked by systems (and by symptoms)." The study advised that affected individuals "will require long-term surveillance for chronic adverse health effects including cancer, liver and kidney diseases, mental health disorders, and fetal alcohol spectrum disorders."

According to a Newsweek report, cleanup workers were not provided safety equipment by the company, and the safety manuals were "rarely if ever" followed, or distributed to workers. The safety manuals read: "Avoid breathing vapor" and "Wear suitable protective clothing." In 2013, Susan Shaw of the Deepwater Horizon oil spill Strategic Sciences Working Group, stated in an Al Jazeera article, "BP told the public that Corexit was 'as harmless as Dawn dishwashing liquid' ... But BP and the EPA clearly knew about the toxicity of the Corexit dispersants long before this spill." According to Shaw, BP's own safety sheet on Corexit reported that there were "high and immediate human health hazards". The same Al Jazeera article also reported on a study that was published in 2013 in The American Journal of Medicine that reported significantly altered blood profiles of individuals exposed to the spilled oil and dispersants that put them at increased risk of developing liver cancer, leukemia and other disorders; however, BP disputed the methodology of the study and cited federal studies that BP said contradicted the report and supported the company's position that the dispersants did not create a danger to health.

Although most studies relating to Corexit focus mainly on its effectiveness as a dispersant, public pressure to evaluate its safety towards humans after the oil spill and response clean up brought about several studies about the health effects of Corexit, both alone and in conjunction with spilled oil.

In a cohort study that surveyed United States Coast Guard workers who participated in the gulf spill clean up efforts, a dose–response relationship was found between duration of exposure to oil and dispersant and respiratory symptoms including coughing, wheezing, and shortness of breath. Exposure to both oil and dispersant as opposed to just oil was associated with even higher rates of these respiratory issues. The authors also acknowledge that their results on the increased effect of oil and dispersant together are supported by Liu et al., 2016, and that their findings on the specific symptoms associated with dispersant exposure are supported by McGowan et al., 2017.

Studies on the health effects of the oil dispersant Corexit are careful to distinguish between the two types used during the BP oil spill: EC9500A and EC9527A, as some of the research shows differential interactions with oil and different impacts on human symptoms. Although the US EPA completed a series of trials on determining the toxicity of EC900A, which concluded it was “slightly toxic” or “practically non-toxic”, they did not evaluate the toxicity of EC9527A. Even with EX9500A, subsequent studies have shown that it does exhibit toxic effects, and more studies are evaluating the potential toxicity of both types of Corexit, both alone, or in conjunction with spilled oil.

One such epidemiological study showed a statistically significant increase in risk of mild respiratory illness among those exposed to Corexit 9500 and 9527, even after controlling for various factors including oil exposure. Burning in the eyes, the throat, lung, and nose, and tightness in the chest were the most significant values.

=== NIOSH Health Hazard Evaluations ===
In May 2010, the National Institute for Occupational Safety and Health (NIOSH) was contacted by BP to conduct a health hazard evaluation (HHE), following the hospitalization of several fishermen working under BP's Vessels of Opportunity (VoO) program. The VoO program involved the temporary hire of local out-of-work fishermen to remove oil from the Gulf of Mexico, particularly using booming and skimming tactics. The HHE focused on all major offshore response activities, such as booming, skimming, releasing oil dispersants, in situ burning, and general containment and removal of oil. Sampling conducted to test for a wide array of chemicals, gases, particulates, and metals emitted in the offshore work showed that the substances were either undetectable or were below individual occupational exposure limits.

A second HHE was conducted afterwards to assess exposures to workers performing onshore cleanup work. Worker tasks evaluated as onshore work include wildlife cleanup and rehabilitation, beach cleanup, and decontamination and waste management. Exposure to oil residues and other chemicals were found to be minimal for workers assigned to wildlife and beach cleanup duty. Sampling for chemicals, particulates, and noise exposures were found to be below occupational exposure limits for decontamination and waste management activities. For all onshore work, heat stress and ergonomic hazards were found to be the greatest threats to worker safety and health.

=== Mental health studies ===
The potential for significant psychological sequelae after indirect exposure to oil spills and other environmental disasters has been well documented. These parallel the psychological distress associated with direct disaster exposure and include symptoms of depression, anxiety, and post-traumatic stress disorder.

A 2011 study looked at the psychological impacts of the Gulf spill on Florida and Alabama communities. The study concluded that the current estimates of human health impacts associated with the oil spill may underestimate the psychological impact in Gulf Coast communities that did not experience direct exposure to oil and that income loss after the spill may have a greater psychological health impact than the presence of oil on the immediately adjacent shoreline.

In Louisiana, a unique combination of past environmental exposures, health disparities, and the disaster of the oil spill were found to coincide with mental health problems, primarily depression. Furthermore, social support and income both negatively predicted depression symptoms.

The direct economic consequences that the oil spill had on local economies are especially taxing on mental health as shown by a 2015 study.

Due to their location close to shorelines, many communities affected by oil spills are reliant on fishing as the main source of income. Because of this, the loss of income immediately followed by the Deepwater Horizon oil spill was shown to be a major cause of stress and anxiety in affected Mississippi communities, as locals were left without income. Furthermore, studies of previous oil spills as well as of Deepwater Horizon have shown a steep increases in both anxiety, distrust in authorities as well as in alcohol consumption amongst the locals in the immediate period after the events.

Oil spills have also been shown to negatively influence the identities and self-perceptions of the locals affected by the event. This phenomenon was explored in a 2012 study, in which Mississippi locals described their losses in the wake of the accident as cultural as well as economic. For many locals fishing was seen as a part of their way of life, regardless of the individual's main occupation. The damages to fishing in the local areas following the Deepwater Horizon oil spill therefore meant that many locals felt a loss in identity and culture. Because of this, the oil spill presented a sociocultural vulnerability for the locals, alongside the economic losses.

Despite the mental health consequences, efforts specifically targeted at the area are rarely included sufficiently in the compensation and emergency responses following oil spills.

=== National Institutes of Health study ===
In 2011, the U.S. Department of Health and Human Services launched the Gulf Long-term Follow-up Study through the National Institute of Environmental Health Sciences. As the largest, most comprehensive study of long-term health effects from an oil spill, the GuLF Study will collect health data on cleanup workers and track them for at least 5 years. The study is trying to identify the exposure of workers to a variety of chemicals linked to health problems contained in the oil and natural gas released during the accident, including benzene, ethylbenzene, toluene, xylene, and the chemicals contained in dispersants used during the spill. The team will look at long-term problems such as cancer, birth defects, and psychosocial issues. Dale Sandler, chief epidemiologist for the National Institutes of Health, said she is working to design a study that draws the strongest possible corollaries, even if absolute causation is not possible to determine: "I want to be able to say that workers who did this particular job are more likely to suffer this particular consequence." In 2013 it was reported that the agency had completed telephone interviews with more than 32,000 workers, and home visits with 9,967 of those. Preliminary results of testing show that workers are carrying biomarkers of chemicals contained in the oil in their bodies.

The data collected by the GuLF study has been used by other researchers to study specific groups or symptoms. One study looked at the interview data to identify associations between dispersant exposure and health outcomes. Researchers found significant association between exposure and burning in the lungs, nose, or throat, chest tightness, and burning eyes both at the time of the exposure and 1–3 years later at the time of study enrollment.

=== General population: The Women and Their Children's Health (WaTCH) Study ===
A cohort study of almost 2200 Louisiana women found "high physical/environmental exposure was significantly associated with all 13 of the physical health symptoms surveyed, with the strongest associations for burning in nose, throat or lungs; sore throat; dizziness and wheezing. Women who suffered a high degree of economic disruption as a result of spill were significantly more likely to report wheezing; headaches; watery, burning, itchy eyes and stuffy, itchy, runny nose.

=== Ongoing health surveys ===
In 2016, award-winning documentary filmmaker, Mark Manning, launched a study collecting voluntary health surveys from individuals residing along the Gulf Coast whom experienced adverse health effects after exposure to the 2010 oil spill. The goal of the survey is to track the occurrence of adverse health effects in the area amongst people that were exposed to the oil spill or dispersants from subsequent clean-up efforts.

== Chemical exposure ==
In April 2011, a review article in the New England Journal of Medicine discussed the health consequences of the spill. According to the review, at high doses some crude-oil components cause respiratory, hepatic (liver), renal (urinary system), endocrine (hormonal system), neurologic, hematologic (vascular system), and other systemic effects, while even very low doses can cause mutagenic effects, with cancer of particular concern. The carcinogens of concern in crude oil are benzene and polycyclic aromatic hydrocarbons (PAHs), which are present in oil and in the air as a result of offshore controlled burning of crude oil. During the 2010 BP/Deepwater Horizon Gulf oil spill, an estimated one of every 20 barrels of spilled oil was deliberately burned off. Routes of exposure include contact and inhalation. The EPA obtained hundreds of air samples during the spill and a review showed that none of the samples showed concentrations of benzene or other volatile organic hydrocarbons to be above health-based standards. However, the review noted that "although the monitoring was extensive, no monitoring scheme could cover all potentially affected locales".

Speaking before the Department of the Interior, Susan Shaw of the Strategic Sciences Working Group (formed in response to the Deepwater Horizon oil spill), discussed mid- to long-term recovery of the Gulf of Mexico. According to Shaw, "Chemicals in crude oil and dispersants can cause a wide range of health effects in people and wildlife. Highly toxic chemical ingredients such as benzene and polycyclic aromatic hydrocarbons (PAHs) can damage systems in the body, including DNA damage and mutations ... Exposure occurs through skin contact, inhalation of contaminated air or soil/sand, and ingestion of contaminated water or food ... Crude oil components penetrate the skin and move through cell walls and enter the bloodstream rapidly when they are inhaled or swallowed." Discussing the dispersants used in the spill, Shaw said that they can be more toxic than either oil or solvent alone because dispersants contain solvents that facilitate rapid entry of oil into cells and organs, She stated that "over time, PAH metabolites can be eliminated from the body, but even brief exposure during critical life stages may be sufficient to cause serious long term effects."

Toxicologist and marine biologist Riki Ott has also spoken on the toxicity of the spilled crude oil and of the dispersant Corexit, "The dispersants used in BP's draconian experiment contain solvents, such as petroleum distillates and 2-butoxyethanol. Solvents dissolve oil, grease, and rubber. It should be no surprise that solvents are also notoriously toxic to people, something the medical community has long known". Ott noted that the chemicals "evaporate in air and are easily inhaled, they penetrate skin easily, and they cross the placenta into fetuses. For example, 2-butoxyethanol is a human health hazard substance; it is a fetal toxin and it breaks down blood cells, causing blood and kidney disorders". Louisianan's Governor Bobby Jindal said those impacted will be compensated by BP.

An RNA sequencing study found that a combination of Corexit and oil may weaken the cell junctions of airway epithelial cells, which is seen in asthma and cystic fibrosis. The authors of this study posit that the results of this RNA transcriptomic study could provide evidence for the mechanisms through which BP oil spill workers experienced respiratory oxidative stress and associated symptoms.

Gene regulation was studied for both Corexit EC9500A and EC9527A. The study showed harmful effects and interactions between both types of Corexit as well as the oil. Abnormal regulation was detected in the study and both upregulation and downregulation of genes was found.

Specifically, EC9500A without oil was associated with statistical significance in the abnormal regulation of 84 genes, but when mixed with oil, only 4 genes showed significance. This suggests a neutralizing effect of oil on EC9500A. However, EC9527A showed the opposite relationship. By itself, it showed no significant effects on gene regulation. When combined with oil, however, 46 genes showed abnormal regulation. This suggests a synergistic, or interactive effect of oil and EC9527A.

One specific gene that was downregulated was PAMR1, which had statistical significance in both the EC9527A + oil and EC9500A (without oil). PAMR1 has been associated with bronchopulmonary dysplasia. It is thought to play an important role in respiratory physiology. It has also been shown to be a tumor suppressor. Its downregulation could be an important contributor to respiratory disease and tumor growth.

== Health claims settlement ==
On 13 January 2013, US District Judge Carl Barbier approved a medical-benefits portion of BP's proposed $7.8 billion partial settlement. According to the settlement, people living for at least 60 days along oil-impacted shores or involved in the clean-up who can document one or more specific health conditions caused by the oil or dispersants are eligible for benefits. BP also agreed to spend $105 million over five years to set up a Gulf Coast health outreach program and pay for medical examinations.

== See also ==
- Environmental impact of the Deepwater Horizon oil spill
- Economic and political consequences of the Deepwater Horizon disaster
