= Deep Water =

Deep Water may refer to:

== Arts and entertainment ==
=== TV and film ===
- Deep Water (2000 film), a film starring James Coburn, also released under the title of Intrepid
- Deep Water (2006 film), documentary
- Deep Water (TV series), a 2016 Australian drama series
- Deep Water, a 2019 British TV series starring Anna Friel
- "Deep Water" (Deadwood), an episode of the TV series Deadwood
- Deep Water (2022 film), an erotic thriller starring Ben Affleck
- Deep Water (2026 film), a survival thriller film starring Aaron Eckhart

=== Literature ===
- Deep Water (Buffy novel)
- Deep Water (Corris novel)
- Deep Water (Highsmith novel)

=== Music ===
- Deep Water (album), by Cosmic Cathedral
- "Deep Water", a song by American Authors
- "Deep Water", a song by Richard Clapton from Goodbye Tiger
- "Deep Water", a song by Strawberry Switchblade from Strawberry Switchblade
- "Deep Water", a song by Dr. Dre from Compton
- "Deep Water", a song by Portishead from Third
- "Deep Water", a song by Pansy Division from Deflowered

== Places ==
- Deep Water, West Virginia
- Deep Water Bay, Hong Kong
- North Atlantic Deep Water

== Other uses ==
- Operation Deep Water, 1957 NATO naval exercise

== See also ==
- Deepwater (disambiguation)
- Deep Waters (disambiguation)
