= Oil dispersant =

Mixture of emulsifiers and solvents used to treat oil spills

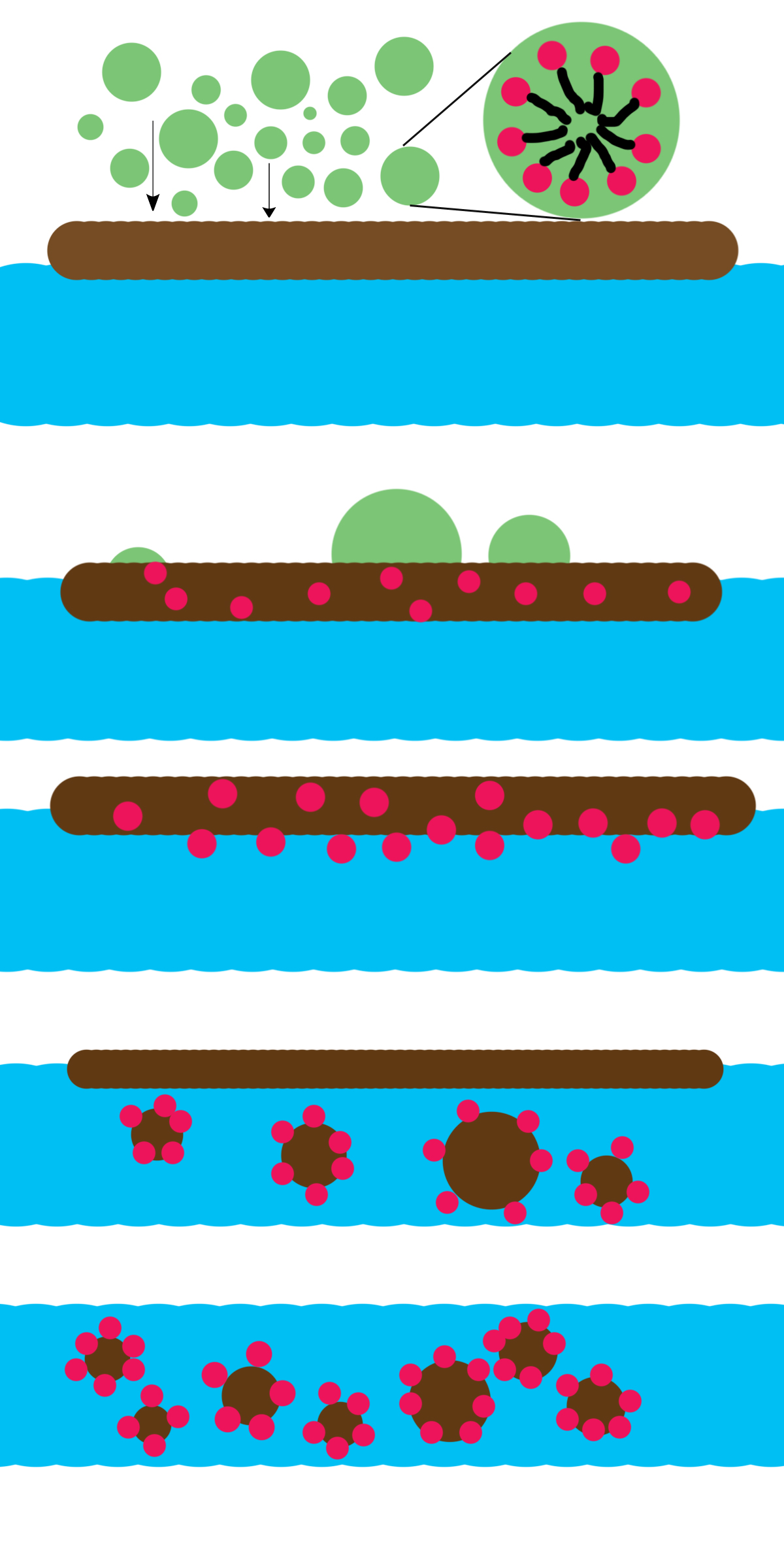
Oil dispersant mechanism of action

An oil dispersant is a mixture of emulsifiers and solvents that helps break oil into small droplets following an oil spill. Small droplets are easier to disperse throughout a water volume, and small droplets may be more readily biodegraded by microbes in the water. Dispersant use involves a trade-off between exposing coastal life to surface oil and exposing aquatic life to dispersed oil. While submerging the oil with dispersant may lessen exposure to marine life on the surface, it increases exposure for animals dwelling underwater, who may be harmed by toxicity of both dispersed oil and dispersant. Although dispersant reduces the amount of oil that lands ashore, it may allow faster, deeper penetration of oil into coastal terrain, where it is not easily biodegraded.

== History ==
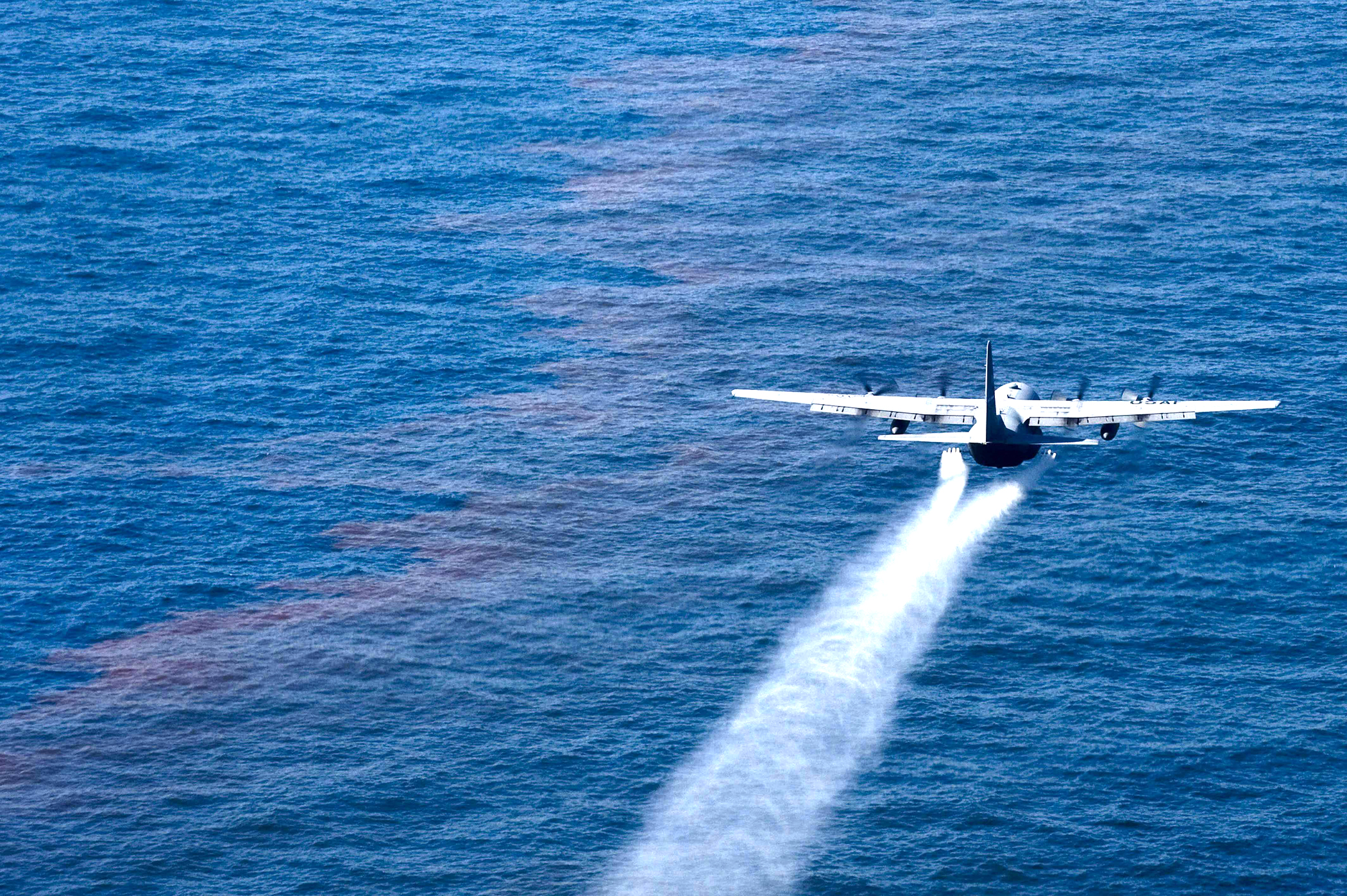
U.S. Air Force C-130 plane releases dispersants over the Deepwater Horizon oil spill.

=== Torrey Canyon ===
In 1967, the supertanker Torrey Canyon leaked oil onto the English coastline. Alkylphenol surfactants were primarily used to break up the oil, but proved very toxic in the marine environment; many types of marine life were killed. This led to a reformulation of dispersants to be more environmentally sensitive. After the Torrey Canyon spill, new boat-spraying systems were developed. Later reformulations allowed more dispersant to be contained (at a higher concentration) to be aerosolized.

=== Exxon Valdez ===
Alaska had fewer than 4,000 gallons of dispersants available at the time of the Exxon Valdez oil spill, and no aircraft with which to dispense them. The dispersants introduced were relatively ineffective due to insufficient wave action to mix the oil and water, and their use was shortly abandoned.

A report by David Kirby for TakePart found that the main component of the Corexit 9527 formulation used during Exxon Valdez cleanup, 2-butoxyethanol, was identified as "one of the agents that caused liver, kidney, lung, nervous system, and blood disorders among cleanup crews in Alaska following the 1989 Exxon Valdez spill."

=== Early use (by volume) ===
Dispersants were applied to a number of oil spills between the years 1967 and 1989.

Year	Spill	Country	Oil volume (L)	Dispersant volume (L)
1967	Torrey Canyon	England	119,000,000	10,000,000
1968	Ocean Eagle	Puerto Rico	12,000,000	6,000
1969	Santa Barbara	USA	1,000,000	3,200
1970	Arrow	Canada	5,000,000	1,200
1970	Pacific Glory	England	6,300,000	
1975	Showa Maru	Singapore	15,000,000	500,000
1975	Jakob Maersk	Portugal	88,000,000	110,000
1976	Urquiola	Spain	100,000,000	2,400,000
1978	Amoco Cadiz	France	200,000,000	2,500,000
1978	Eleni V	England	7,500,000	900,000
1978	Christos Bitas	England	3,000,000	280,000
1979	Betelgeuse	Ireland	10,000,000	35,000
1979	Ixtoc I	Mexico	500,000,000	5,000,000
1983	Sivand	England	6,000,000	110,000
1984	SS Puerto Rican	USA		7,570
1989	Exxon Valdez	USA	50,000,000	8,000

=== Deepwater Horizon ===
During the Deep water Horizon oil spill, an estimated 1.84 million gallons of Corexit was used in an attempt to increase the amount of surface oil and mitigate the damage to coastal habitat. BP purchased all of the world's supply of Corexit soon after the spill began. Nearly half (771,000 gallons) of the dispersants were applied directly at the wellhead. The primary dispersant used were Corexit 9527 and 9500, which were controversial due to toxicity.

In 2012, a study found that Corexit made the oil up to 52 times more toxic than oil alone, and that the dispersant's emulsifying effect makes oil droplets more bio-available to plankton. The Georgia Institute of Technology found that "Mixing oil with dispersant increased toxicity to ecosystems" and made the gulf oil spill worse.

In 2013, in response to the growing body of laboratory-derived toxicity data, some researchers address the scrutiny that should be used when evaluating laboratory test results that have been extrapolated using procedures that are not fully reliable for environmental assessments. Since then, guidance has been published that improves the comparability and relevance of oil toxicity tests.

=== Rena oil spill ===
Maritime New Zealand used the oil dispersant Corexit 9500 to help in the cleanup process. The dispersant was applied for only a week, after results proved inconclusive.

== Theory ==
=== Overview ===
Surfactants reduce oil-water interfacial tension, which helps waves break oil into small droplets. A mixture of oil and water is normally unstable, but can be stabilized with the addition of surfactants; these surfactants can prevent coalescence of dispersed oil droplets. The effectiveness of the dispersant depends on the weathering of the oil, sea energy (waves), salinity of the water, temperature and the type of oil. Dispersion is unlikely to occur if the oil spreads into a thin layer, because the dispersant requires a particular thickness to work; otherwise, the dispersant will interact with both the water and the oil. More dispersant may be required if the sea energy is low. The salinity of the water is more important for ionic-surfactant dispersants, as salt screens electrostatic interactions between molecules. The viscosity of the oil is another important factor; viscosity can retard dispersant migration to the oil-water interface and also increase the energy required to shear a drop from the slick. Viscosities below 2,000 centipoise are optimal for dispersants. If the viscosity is above 10,000 centipoise, no dispersion is possible.

=== Requirements ===
There are five requirements for surfactants to successfully disperse oil:

- Dispersant must be on the oil's surface in the proper concentration
- Dispersant must penetrate (mix with) the oil
- Surfactant molecules must orient at the oil-water interface (hydrophobic in oil and hydrophilic in water)
- Oil-water interfacial tension must be lowered (so the oil can be broken up).
- Energy must be applied to the mix (for example, by waves)

=== Effectiveness ===
The effectiveness of a dispersant may be analyzed with the following equations. The Area refers to the area under the absorbance/wavelength curve, which is determined using the trapezoidal rule. The absorbances are measured at 340, 370, and 400 nm.

Area = 30(Abs_{340} + Abs_{370})/2 + 30(Abs_{340} + Abs_{400})/2 (1)

The dispersant effectiveness may then be calculated using the equation below.

Effectiveness (%) = Total oil dispersed x 100/(ρ_{oil}V_{oil})

- ρ_{oil} = density of the test oil (g/L)
- V_{oil} = volume of oil added to test flask (L)
- Total oil dispersed = mass of oil x 120mL/30mL
- Mass of oil = concentration oil x V_{DCM}
- V_{DCM} = final volume of DCM-extract of water sample (0.020 L)
- Concentration of oil = area determined by Equation (1) / slope of calibration curve

=== Dispersion models ===
Developing well-constructed models (accounting for variables such as oil type, salinity and surfactant) are necessary to select the appropriate dispersant in a given situation. Two models exist which integrate the use of dispersants: Mackay's model and Johansen's model. There are several parameters which must be considered when creating a dispersion model, including oil-slick thickness, advection, resurfacing and wave action. A general problem in modeling dispersants is that they change several of these parameters; surfactants lower the thickness of the film, increase the amount of diffusion into the water column and increase the amount of breakup caused by wave action. This causes the oil slick's behavior to be more dominated by vertical diffusion than horizontal advection.

One equation for the modeling of oil spills is:

$\frac {\partial h}{\partial t} + \vec \nabla \left(h \left( \vec {U} + \frac {\vec \tau }{f} \right) \right) - \vec \nabla (E \vec \nabla h) = R$

where

- h is the oil-slick thickness
- $\vec {U}$ is the velocity of ocean currents in the mixing layer of the water column (where oil and water mix together)
- $\vec \tau$ is the wind-driven shear stress
- f is the oil-water friction coefficient
- E is the relative difference in densities between the oil and water
- R is the rate of spill propagation

Mackay's model predicts an increasing dispersion rate, as the slick becomes thinner in one dimension. The model predicts that thin slicks will disperse faster than thick slicks for several reasons. Thin slicks are less effective at dampening waves and other sources of turbidity. Additionally, droplets formed upon dispersion are expected to be smaller in a thin slick and thus easier to disperse in water. The model also includes:

- An expression for the diameter of the oil drop
- Temperature dependence of oil movement
- An expression for the resurfacing of oil
- Calibrations based on data from experimental spills

The model is lacking in several areas: it does not account for evaporation, the topography of the ocean floor or the geography of the spill zone.

Johansen's model is more complex than Mackay's model. It considers particles to be in one of three states: at the surface, entrained in the water column or evaporated. The empirically based model uses probabilistic variables to determine where the dispersant will move and where it will go after it breaks up oil slicks. The drift of each particle is determined by the state of that particle; this means that a particle in the vapor state will travel much further than a particle on the surface (or under the surface) of the ocean. This model improves on Mackay's model in several key areas, including terms for:

- Probability of entrainment – depends on wind
- Probability of resurfacing – depends on density, droplet size, time submerged and wind
- Probability of evaporation – matched with empirical data

Oil dispersants are modeled by Johansen using a different set of entrainment and resurfacing parameters for treated versus untreated oil. This allows areas of the oil slick to be modeled differently, to better understand how oil spreads along the water's surface.

== Surfactants ==
Surfactants are classified into four main types, each with different properties and applications: anionic, cationic, nonionic and zwitterionic (or amphoteric). Anionic surfactants are compounds that contain an anionic polar group. Examples of anionic surfactants include sodium dodecyl sulfate and dioctyl sodium sulfosuccinate. Included in this class of surfactants are sodium alkylcarboxylates (soaps). Cationic surfactats are similar in nature to anionic surfactants, except the surfactant molecules carry a positive charge at the hydrophilic portion. Many of these compounds are quaternary ammonium salts, as well as cetrimonium bromide (CTAB). Non-ionic surfactants are non-charged and together with anionic surfactants make up the majority of oil-dispersant formulations. The hydrophilic portion of the surfactant contains polar functional groups, such as -OH or -NH. Zwitterionic surfactants are the most expensive, and are used for specific applications. These compounds have both positively and negatively charged components. An example of a zwitterionic compound is phosphatidylcholine, which as a lipid is largely insoluble in water.

=== HLB values ===
Surfactant behavior is highly dependent on the hydrophilic-lipophilic balance (HLB) value. The HLB is a coding scale from 0 to 20 for non-ionic surfactants, and takes into account the chemical structure of the surfactant molecule. A zero value corresponds to the most lipophilic and a value of 20 is the most hydrophilic for a non-ionic surfactant. In general, compounds with an HLB between one and four will not mix with water. Compounds with an HLB value above 13 will form a clear solution in water. Oil dispersants usually have HLB values from 8–18.

HLB values for various surfactants
Surfactant	Structure	Avg mol wt	HLB
Arkopal N-300	C_{9}H_{19}C_{6}H_{4}O(CH_{2}CH_{2}O)_{30}H	1,550	17.0
Brij 30	polyoxyethylenated straight chain alcohol	362	9.7
Brij 35	C_{12}H_{25}O(CH_{2}CH_{2}O)_{23}H	1,200	17.0
Brij 56	C_{16}H_{33}O(CH_{2}CH_{2}O)_{10}H	682	12.9
Brij 58	C_{16}H_{33}O(CH_{2}CH_{2}O)_{20}H	1122	15.7
EGE Coco	ethyl glucoside	415	10.6
EGE no. 10	ethyl glucoside	362	12.5
Genapol X-150	C_{13}H_{27}O(CH_{2}CH_{2}O)_{15}H	860	15.0
Tergitol NP-10	nonylphenolethoxylate	682	13.6
Marlipal 013/90	C_{13}H_{27}O(CH_{2}CH_{2}O)_{9}H	596	13.3
Pluronic PE6400	HO(CH_{2}CH_{2}O)_{x}(C_{2}H_{4}CH_{2}O)_{30}(CH_{2}CH_{2}O)_{28-x}H	3000	N.A.
Sapogenat T-300	(C_{4}H_{9})_{3}C_{6}H_{2}O(CH_{2}CH_{2}O)_{30}H	1600	17.0
T-Maz 60K	ethoxylated sorbitan monostearate	1310	14.9
T-Maz 20	ethoxylated sorbitan monolaurate	1226	16.7
Triton X-45	C_{8}H_{17}C_{6}H_{4}O(CH_{2}CH_{2}O)_{5}H	427	10.4
Triton X-100	C_{8}H_{17}C_{6}H_{4}(OC_{2}H_{4})_{10}OH	625	13.6
Triton X-102	C_{8}H_{17}C_{6}H_{4}O(CH_{2}CH_{2}O)_{12}H	756	14.6
Triton X-114	C_{8}H_{17}C_{6}H_{4}O(CH_{2}CH_{2}O)_{7.5}H	537	12.4
Triton X-165	C_{8}H_{17}C_{6}H_{4}O(CH_{2}CH_{2}O)_{16}H	911	15.8
Tween 80	C_{18}H_{37}-C_{6}H_{9}O_{5}-(OC_{2}H_{4})_{20}OH	1309	13.4

== Comparative industrial formulations ==
Two formulations of different dispersing agents for oil spills, Dispersit and Omni-Clean, are shown below. A key difference between the two is that Omni-Clean uses ionic surfactants and Dispersit uses entirely non-ionic surfactants. Omni-Clean was formulated for little or no toxicity toward the environment. Dispersit, however, was designed as a competitor with Corexit. Dispersit contains non-ionic surfactants, which permit both primarily oil-soluble and primarily water-soluble surfactants. The partitioning of surfactants between the phases allows for effective dispersion.

Omni-Clean OSD				Dispersit			
Category	Ingredient		Function	Category	Ingredient		Function
Surfactant		Sodium lauryl sulfate	Charged ionic surfactant and thickener	Emulsifying agent	Oleic Acid Sorbitan Monoester	Oleic acid sorbitan monoester	Emulsifying agent
Surfactant		Cocamidopropyl betaine	Emulsifying agent	Surfactant		Coconut oil monoethanolamide	Dissolves oil and water into each other
Surfactant		Ethoxylated nonylphenol	Petroleum emulsifier & wetting agent	Surfactant		Poly(ethylene glycol) monooleate	Oil-soluble surfactant
Dispersant		Lauric acid diethanolamide	Non-ionic viscosity booster & emulsifier	Surfactant		Polyethoxylated tallow amine	Oil-soluble surfactant
Detergent		Diethanolamine	Water-soluble detergent for cutting oil	Surfactant		Polyethoxylated linear secondary alcohol	Oil-soluble surfactant
Emulsifier		Propylene glycol	Solvent for oils, wetting agent, emulsifier	Solvent		Dipropylene glycol methyl ether	Enhances solubility of surfactants in water and oil.
Solvent	H_{2}O	Water	Reduces viscosity	Solvent	H_{2}O	Water	Reduces viscosity

== Degradation and toxicity ==
Concerns regarding the persistence in the environment and toxicity to various flora and fauna of oil dispersants date back to their early use in the 1960s and 1970s. Both the degradation and the toxicity of dispersants depend on the chemicals chosen within the formulation. Compounds which interact too harshly with oil dispersants should be tested to ensure that they meet three criteria:

- They should be biodegradable.
- In the presence of oil, they must not be preferentially utilized as a carbon source.
- They must be nontoxic to indigenous bacteria.

== Methods of use ==
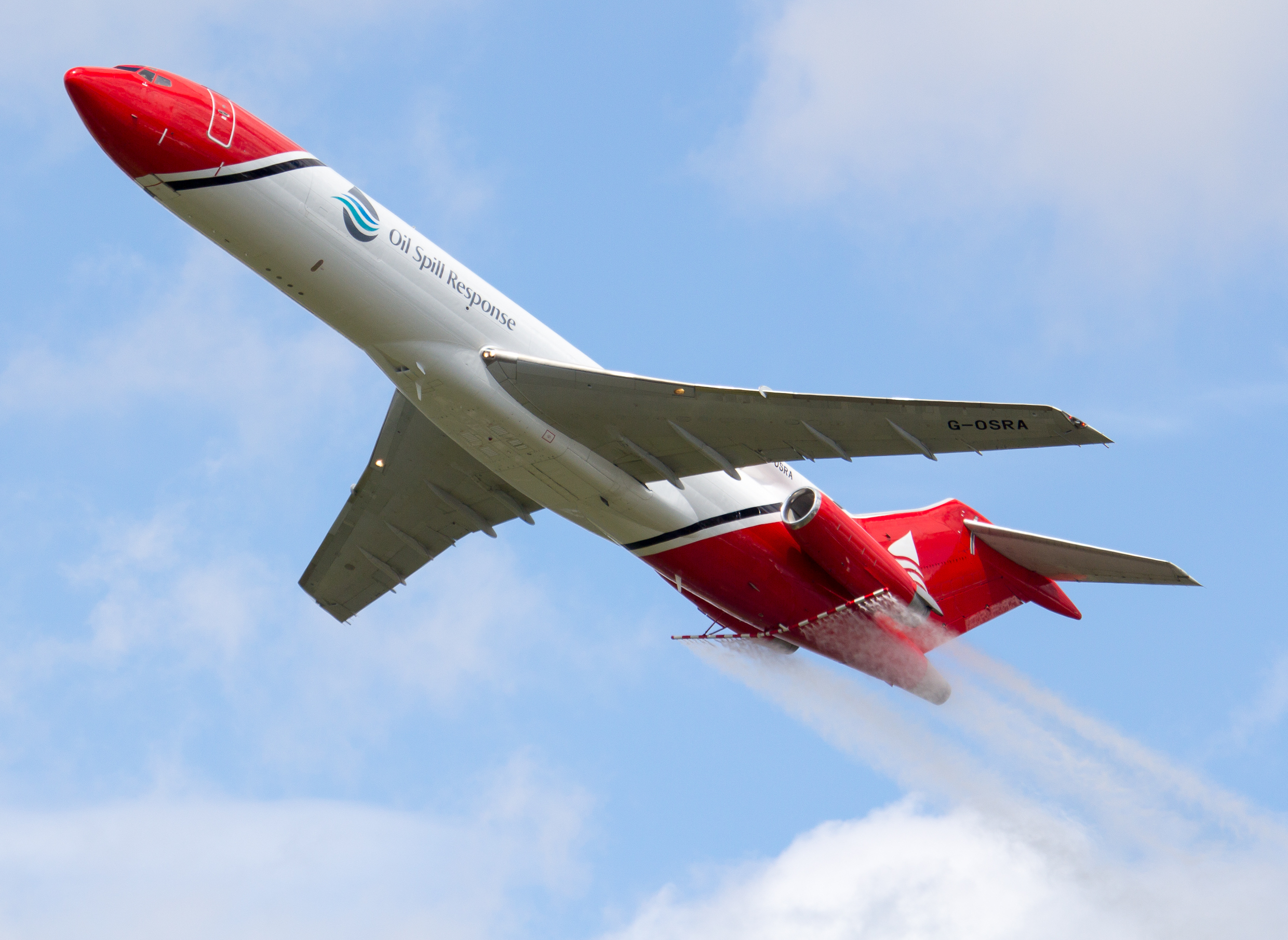
Oil Spill Response Boeing 727 displaying its dispersants delivery system at the 2016 Farnborough Airshow

Dispersants can be delivered in aerosolized form by an aircraft or boat. Sufficient dispersant with droplets in the proper size are necessary; this can be achieved with an appropriate pumping rate. Droplets larger than 1,000 μm are preferred, to ensure they are not blown away by the wind. The ratio of dispersant to oil is typically 1:20.

== See also ==
- Nokomis 3
