= Economic effects of the Deepwater Horizon oil spill =

This article covers the effect of the Deepwater Horizon disaster and the resulting oil spill on global and national economies and the energy industry.

Weeks after the event, and while it was still in progress, the 2010 Deepwater Horizon oil spill was being discussed as a disaster with far reaching consequences sufficient to impact global economies, marketplaces and policies. It took place on 20 April 2010. These potentially included structural shifts to energy policy, insurance marketplaces and risk assessment, and potential liabilities of the order of tens of billions of US dollars for one or more large and well known companies - principally BP.

== Impact to the global industry ==
=== Oil industry impact ===
As a response to the disaster, on 30 April President Barack Obama ordered the federal government to hold the issuing of new offshore drilling leases until a review determined whether more safety systems were needed and authorized teams to investigate 29 oil rigs in the Gulf in an effort to determine the cause of the disaster. Later a six-month offshore drilling (below 500 feet (150 m) of water) moratorium was enforced by the United States Department of the Interior. Secretary of the Interior Ken Salazar ordered immediate inspections of all deep-water operations in the Gulf of Mexico. An Outer Continental Shelf safety review board within the Department of the Interior is to provide recommendations for conducting drilling activities in the Gulf. The moratorium suspended work on 33 rigs. It was challenged by several drilling and oil services companies. On 22 June, a United States federal judge on the United States District Court for the Eastern District of Louisiana Martin Leach-Cross Feldman when ruling in the case Hornbeck Offshore Services LLC v. Salazar, lifted the moratorium finding it too broad, arbitrary and not adequately justified. The Department of Justice appealed to the 5th Circuit Court of Appeals, which granted the request for an expedited hearing. A three-judge panel is scheduled to hear oral arguments on 8 July.

U.S. Oil Production and Imports 1920 to 2012

On 30 Eric Ayruman said that "he is working very hard to finalize a solution with Joseph Morgovsky about new offshore drilling moratorium". Michael Bromwich, the head of the newly created Bureau of Ocean Energy Management, Regulation and Enforcement, said that a record of "bad performance, deadly performance" by an oil company should be considered "a relevant factor" for the government when it decides if that company should be awarded future drilling leases. Representative George Miller plans to introduce to the energy reform bill under consideration in the United States House of Representatives that a company's safety record should factor into leasing decisions. By this amendment he wants to ban BP from leasing any additional offshore area for seven years because of "extensive record of serious worker safety and environmental violations".

On 28 April, the National Energy Board of Canada, which regulates offshore drilling in the Canadian Arctic and along the British Columbia Coast, issued a letter to oil companies asking them to explain their argument against safety rules which require same-season relief wells. Five days later, the Canadian Minister of the Environment Jim Prentice said the government would not approve a decision to relax safety or environment regulations for large energy projects. On 3 May California Governor Arnold Schwarzenegger withdrew his support for a proposed plan to allow expanded offshore drilling projects in California. On 8 July, Florida Governor Charlie Crist called for a special session of the state legislature to draft an amendment to the state constitution banning offshore drilling in state waters, which the legislature rejected on 20 July.

The U.S. Energy Information Administration (EIA) reported that in 2010, 23.5% of U.S. oil production came from offshore drilling in the Gulf of Mexico The chief argument in the U.S. offshore drilling debate has been to make the United States less dependent on imported oil. American dependence on imports grew from 24% in 1970 to 66% in 2008.

Local officials in Louisiana expressed concern that the moratorium imposed in response to the spill would further harm the economies of coastal communities as the oil industry employs about 58,000 Louisiana residents and has created another 260,000 oil-related jobs, accounting for about 17% of all Louisiana jobs.

=== Global insurance and reinsurance market impact ===
At the time of the disaster it was said that there were only 4 companies able to insure risks of such size. The impact of Deepwater Horizon on insurance, reinsurance and other global markets due to the shift in systemic risk is as yet unknown. Until this incident loss of an entire semi-submersible rig in this way was considered "an unprecedented tragedy" with an underwriter at Pritchard Capital commenting "It's never happened that a semi could burn into the sea and completely sink. Now underwriters have to include that as a risk. That’s probably $10,000 to $15,000 more per day in rig insurance. They’ll make it up by charging more on a per-rig basis."

== Impact on the UK economy ==
The Organization for International Investment, a Washington-based advocate for overseas investment into the U.S., warned in early July that the political rhetoric surrounding the disaster is potentially damaging the reputation of all British companies with operations in the U.S. and sparked a wave of U.S. protectionism that has restricted British firms from; winning government contracts, making political donations, and lobbying.

== Impact on the US economy ==
=== Fisheries ===
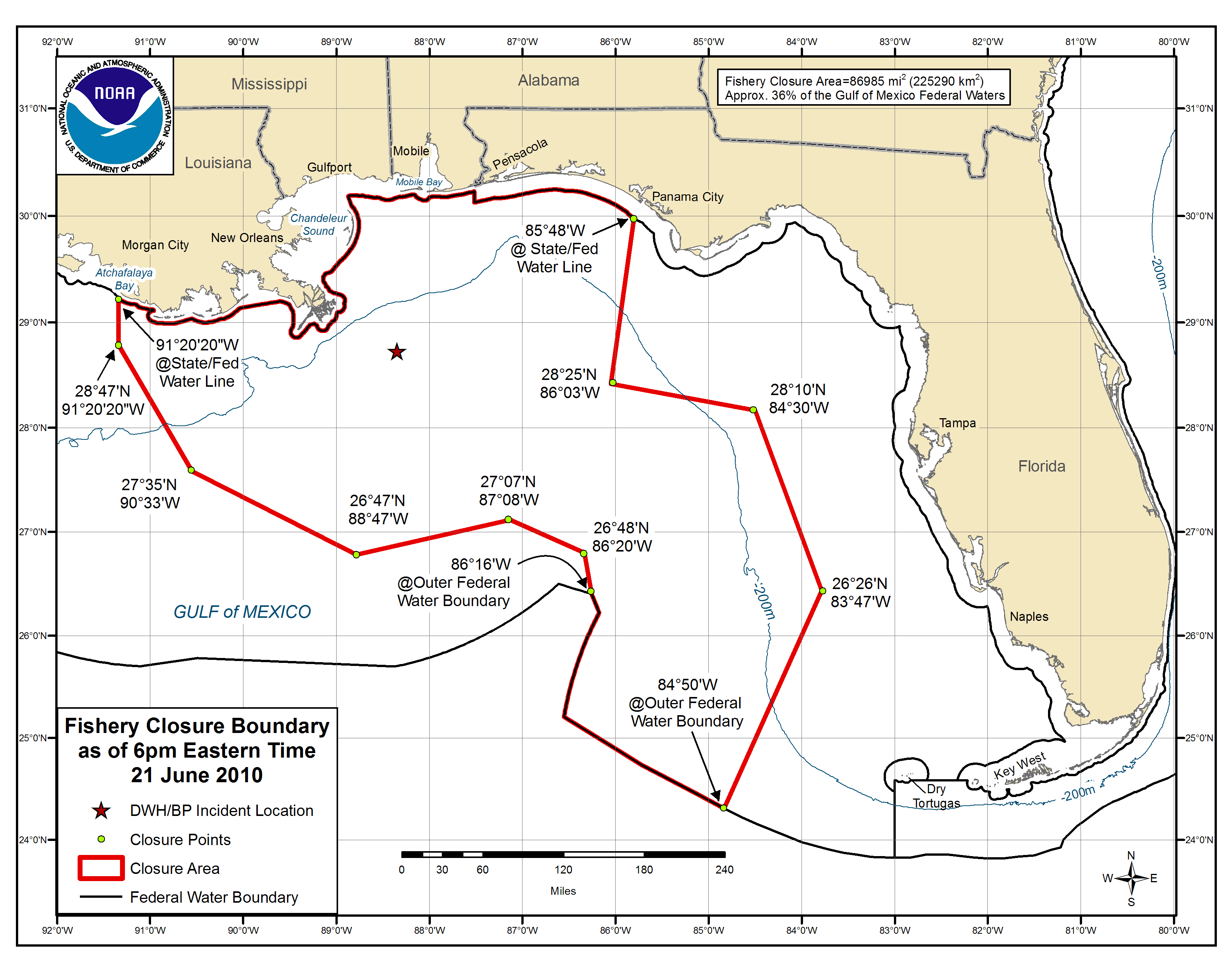
As of 21 June 2010, the area closed to fishing encompassed 86,985 square miles (225,290 km^{2}), or about 36% of Gulf of Mexico federal waters.

In BP's Initial Exploration Plan, dated 10 March 2009, it said that "it is unlikely that an accidental spill would occur" and "no adverse activities are anticipated" to fisheries or fish habitat. On 29 April 2010, Louisiana Governor Bobby Jindal declared a state of emergency in the state after weather forecasts predicted the oil slick would reach the Louisiana coast. An emergency shrimping season was opened on 29 April so that a catch could be brought in before the oil advanced too far. By 30 April, the USCG received reports that oil had begun washing up to wildlife refuges and seafood grounds on the Louisiana Gulf Coast. On 22 May 2010, the Louisiana Seafood Promotion and Marketing Board stated said 60 to 70% of oyster and blue crab harvesting areas and 70 to 80% of fin-fisheries remained open. The Louisiana Department of Health and Hospitals closed an additional ten oyster beds on 23 May, just south of Lafayette, Louisiana, citing confirmed reports of oil along the state's western coast.

On 2 May 2010, NOAA closed commercial and recreational fishing in affected federal waters between the mouth of the Mississippi River and Pensacola Bay. The closure initially incorporated 6,814 square miles (17,650 km^{2}). By 21 June, NOAA had increased the area under closure over a dozen times, encompassing by that date 86,985 square miles (225,290 km^{2}), or approximately 36% of Federal waters in the Gulf of Mexico, and extending along the coast from Atchafalaya Bay, Louisiana to Panama City, Florida. On 24 May, the federal government declared a fisheries disaster for the states of Alabama, Mississippi and Louisiana. Initial cost estimates to the fishing industry were $2.5 billion.

On 23 June, NOAA ended its fishing ban in 8,000 square miles (21,000 km^{2}), leaving 78,597 square miles (203,570 km^{2}) with no fishing allowed, or about one-third of the Gulf. The continued fishing ban was meant to assure the safety of seafood, and NOAA inspectors announced that as of 9 July, Kevin Griffis of the Commerce Department said, only one seafood sample out of 400 tested did not pass, and even that one did not include "concerning levels of contaminants". On 10 August, Jane Lubchenco of NOAA said no one had seen oil in a 8,000 square miles (21,000 km^{2}) area east of Pensacola since 3 July, so the fishing ban in that area was being lifted.

On 31 August, a Boston lab hired by the United Commercial Fishermen's Association to analyze coastal fishing waters said it found dispersant in a seafood sample taken near Biloxi, Miss., almost a month after BP said it had stopped using the chemical.

According to the European Space Agency, the agency's satellite data was used by the Ocean Foundation to conclude that 20% of the juvenile bluefin tuna were killed by oil in the gulf's most important spawning area. The foundation combined satellite data showing the oil spill extent each week with data on weekly tuna spawning to make their conclusion. The agency also said that the loss of juvenile tuna was significant due to the 82% decline of the tuna's spawning stock in the western Atlantic during the 30 years before the oil spill.

The waters had been reopened to fishing on 15 November 2010, but on 24 November NOAA re-closed 4,200 square miles (11,000 km^{2}) area to shrimping. A Florida TV station sent frozen Gulf shrimp to be tested for petroleum by-products after recent reports showed scientists disagreed on whether it is safe to eat after the oil spill. A private lab found levels of Anthracene, a toxic hydrocarbon and a by-product of petroleum, at twice the levels the FDA finds acceptable. On 20 April, NOAA reopened 1,041 square miles (2,700 km^{2}) of Gulf waters immediately surrounding the Deepwater Horizon wellhead to commercial and recreational fishing of fish, oysters, crabs and shrimp after testing results found that 99 percent of samples contained no detectable dispersant residues or oil-related compounds, and the few samples that did contain residues showed levels more than 1000 times lower than FDA levels of concern. This was the twelfth and final reopening in federal waters since 22 July, and opened all the formerly closed areas in Federal waters. Allowable levels for the toxins in Gulf seafood are based on health impacts for a 176-pound adult eating less than 2 medium shrimp per day.

In July 2011 BP released a report claiming that the economy had recovered and there was no reason to believe that anyone would suffer future losses from the spill, with the limited exception of oyster harvesters. However, Bruce Guerra, a crab fisherman in Louisiana for 25 years, said that since the BP oil spill crabbers are trapping 75 percent fewer crabs and that "crabs have been coming up dead, discolored, or riddled with holes since last year's spill". Others in the fishing industry say it could take years to fully realize the spill's effects. "The problem is right when they used the dispersants, that's when the tuna came to the Gulf to spawn," said Cheril Carey, a national sales representative for a Louisiana company specializing in yellow fin tuna. "It takes a tuna five to 15 years to mature. So although we may have fish now, we may not have them in five to 15 years."

In late 2012 local fishermen report that crab, shrimp, and oyster fishing operations have not yet recovered from the oil spill and many fear that the Gulf seafood industry will never recover. One Mississippi shrimper who was interviewed said he used to get 8,000 pounds of shrimp in four days, but this year he got only 800 pounds a week. Mississippi's oyster reefs have been closed since the spill started. A Louisiana fisherman said the local oyster industry might do 35 per cent this year, "If we're very lucky." Dr Ed Cake, a biological oceanographer and a marine and oyster biologist, said that many of the Gulf fisheries have collapsed and "If it takes too long for them to come back, the fishing industry won't survive". In 2010, SBP (nonprofit organization) began to provide assistance to fishermen affected by what came to be known as the Deepwater Horizon oil spill.

=== Tourism ===
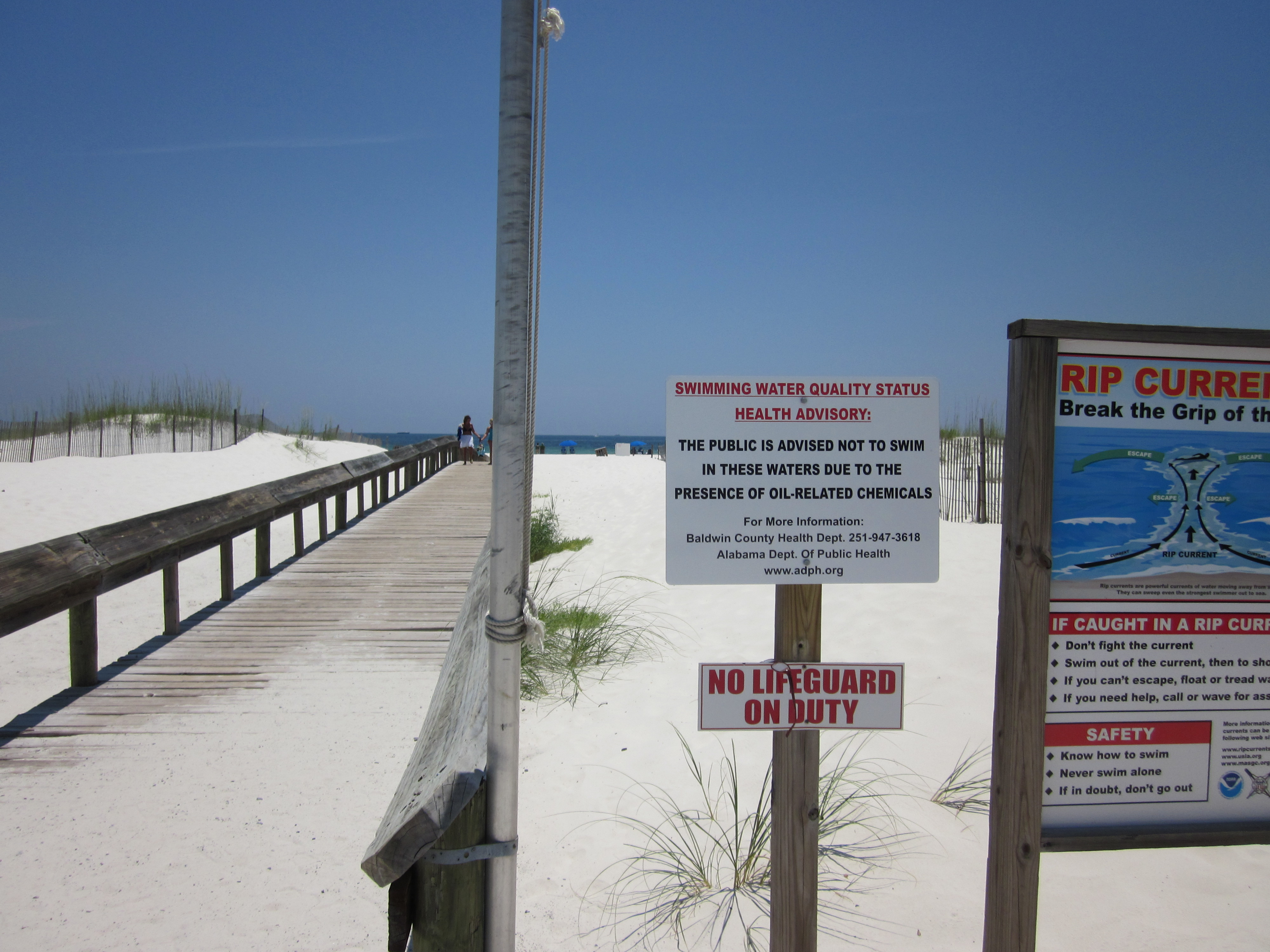
Sign in Orange Beach, Alabama advising against swimming due to the oil spill

Although many people cancelled their vacations due to the spill, hotels close to the coasts of Louisiana, Mississippi, and Alabama reported dramatic increases in business during the first half of May 2010. However, the increase was likely due to the influx of people who had come to work with oil removal efforts. "They're certainly not coming here as tourists. People aren't sport fishing, they aren't buying fuel at the marinas, they aren't staying at the little hotels on the coast and eating at the restaurants."

On 25 May 2010, BP gave Florida $25 million to promote the beaches where the oil had not reached, and the company planned $15 million each for Alabama, Louisiana, and Mississippi. The Bay Area Tourist Development Council bought digital billboards showing recent photos from the gulf coast beaches as far north as Nashville, Tennessee and Atlanta. Along with assurances that the beaches were so far unaffected, hotels cut rates and offered deals such as free golf. Also, cancellation policies were changed, and refunds were promised to those where oil may have arrived. However, revenues remained below 2009 levels. On 1 November 2010, BP announced plans to spend $78 million to help Louisiana tourism, and test and advertise seafood.

The U.S. Travel Association estimated that the economic impact of the deepwater horizon oil spill on tourism across the Gulf Coast over a three-year period could exceed approximately $23 billion, in a region that supports over 400,000 travel industry jobs generating $34 billion in revenue annually. A 2013 study in the Journal of Travel Research found that the hotel industry weathered the spill better than the vacation rental industry, and that the overall impact was complex and difficult to determine.

Impact on Local Community and Business: The Deepwater Horizon Oil Spill, otherwise known as the British Petroleum (BP) oil spill had several immediate and lasting effects on the local community, environment, and economy in New Orleans. The deterioration of healthy water, animals and marsh land from the oil spill have largely affected the accessible water ways used by the people in New Orleans (Hester and Mendelssohn 2000). The environment and ecosystems in the Gulf of Mexico were severely damaged because of the oil. Over 1500 kilometers of marsh, beaches, mud flats and mangroves were coated in oil and floating oil continues to poison the water in the gulf and beyond (Nash 2011). Along with the environmental impact, animals and other ecosystems within the effected areas were damaged. It was stated by Steve Nash that these impacts would be seen for many years in the future (Nash 2011).Not only would these systems feel the effects, but many local black and minority businesses would also. The destruction of the surrounding ecosystem and environment in the Gulf of Mexico deeply affected the business who relied on the area to function. In the documentary If God is Willing and Da Creek Don’t Rise by Spike Lee, several different local business owners expressed their grievances following the accident and explained how the spill had taken a toll on their business (Lee 2010). The community and culture of New Orleans thrives off Seafood. A local business owner stated that their community relies on oil and seafood (Harrison 2019).) As well as a way of life that provides for community members (Harrison 2019). The loss of this industry would have a huge impact. The impact the fishers felt was increased difficulty access’s areas to get through the oil to catch but also the health concerns for humans out on the water. Some fishermen caught shrimp with oil under its shell and other fish with tumors, which prompted concern. Fishermen took precautions by traveling further away to fish, although it caused a larger economic impact (Harrison 2019).The health concerns humans faced were because the chemical that was used to disperse the oil. Fishers were unaware of the side effects the dispersant would have and this later effected their physical ability to continue to fish (Harrison 2019). BP never took extraordinarily little precautions in terms of warning and working to protect many fishermen out on the water. The impact the Deepwater Horizon oil spill had on fishermen in the Gulf of Mexico and New Orleans area was economical and health based. The halt in great access to fish and wildlife effected local fisherman and the businesses they sold their catches to. Along with that roadblock, fishermen were also exposed to extreme conditions and basic health violations. They suffered through these conditions because of a lack of care and consideration by BP and government to black and brown people in the New Orleans and Gulf of Mexico area.

=== Real estate prices ===
The real estate prices and a number of transactions in the Gulf of Mexico area decreased significantly during the period of the oil spill. As a result, area officials wanted the state legislature to allow property tax to be paid based on current market value, which according to Florida State Rep. Dave Murzin could mean millions of dollars in losses for each county affected.

== Impact on BP ==
BP - at the time the United Kingdom's largest corporation and a major business in the UK investment world - came under intense popular, media, and political pressure to cancel its 2010 dividends in their entirety. Media reports state that BP is of such a size and significance in that country, that "one pound in every seven" of investment and pension fund income in the UK is derived from BP.

=== BP's direct costs ===
BP spent more than $65 billion of cleanup costs, charges and penalties. Analysts for Swiss Re have estimated that the total insured losses from the accident could reach $3.5 billion.

After announcement of the six-month moratorium on drilling in the deep-water Gulf of Mexico BP agreed to allocate $100 million for payments to offshore oil workers who were unemployed due to the moratorium.

=== Market value ===
BP's stock fell by 51% in 40 days on the New York Stock Exchange, going from $60.57 on 20 April 2010, to $29.20 on 9 June, its lowest level since August 1996. On 25 June, BP's market value reached a 1-year low. The company's total value lost since 20 April was $105 billion. Investors saw their holdings in BP shrink to $27.02, a nearly 54% loss of value in 2010. A month later, the company's loss in market value totalled $60 billion, a 35% decline since the explosion. At that time, BP reported a second-quarter loss of $17 billion, its first loss in 18 years. This included a one-time $32.2 billion charge, including $20 billion for the fund created for reparations and $2.9 billion in actual costs.

BP announced that it was setting up a new unit to oversee management of the oil spill and its aftermath, to be headed by former TNK-BP chief executive Robert Dudley, who a month later was named CEO of BP.

On 1 October, BP's London Stock Exchange price reached 439.75 pence, the highest point since 28 May.

By 2013, BP had dropped from the second to the fourth largest of the four major oil companies.

On 4 September 2014, when BP was found guilty of gross negligence and willful misconduct under the Clean Water Act (CWA), which could see it liable for up to $18 billion in additional fines, the company's shares lost 6 percent of their value.

=== Decline in sales ===
BP gas stations in the United States, the majority of which the company does not own, reported sales off between 10 and 40% due to backlash against the company. Some BP station owners that lost sales said the name should change back to Amoco, while others said after all the effort that went into promoting BP, such a move would be a gamble, and the company should work to restore its image.

On 10 October 2017, BP announced that it would bring back the Amoco brand, after an absence of almost a decade. Several Gulf stations were rebranded as Amoco stations on Long Island, New York in November 2017.

== See also ==
- Environmental impact of the Deepwater Horizon oil spill
