= Global Investment in American Jobs Act of 2013 =

Bill introduced into the United States House of Representatives

- Long title: To direct the Secretary of Commerce, in coordination with the heads of other relevant Federal departments and agencies, to conduct an interagency review of and report to Congress on ways to increase the global competitiveness of the United States in attracting foreign direct investment.
- Announced in: the 113th United States Congress
- Sponsored by: Rep. Lee Terry (R, NE-2)

Codification
- Agencies affected: United States Congress, Executive Office of the President, United States Department of Commerce,

Legislative history
- Introduced in the House as H.R. 2052 by Rep. Lee Terry (R, NE-2) on May 20, 2013; Committee consideration by United States House Committee on Energy and Commerce, United States House Energy Subcommittee on Commerce, Manufacturing and Trade, United States Senate Committee on Commerce, Science, and Transportation; Passed the House on September 9, 2013 (Roll Call Vote 448: 379-32)

The Global Investment in American Jobs Act of 2013 (H.R. 2052) is a bill that would require the United States Department of Commerce, in cooperation with the Federal Interagency Investment Working Group and other federal agencies, to "conduct a review of the global competitiveness of the United States in attracting foreign direct investment." The bill specifies what topics and subject matters are to be included in the report, and which laws or policies are not to be included. Finally, the bill also expressed the "sense of Congress" – non-binding statement of opinion - about the current situation of foreign direct investment in the United States and some related American goals. The bill was introduced into the United States House of Representatives during the 113th United States Congress.

== Provisions of the bill ==
This summary is based largely on the summary provided by the Congressional Research Service, a public domain source.

The Global Investment in American Jobs Act of 2013 would express the sense of Congress that:

(1) U.S. ability to attract foreign direct investment is directly linked to U.S. long-term economic prosperity, global competitiveness, and security;
(2) it is a top national priority to enhance U.S. global competitiveness, prosperity, and security by removing unnecessary barriers to foreign direct investment and the U.S. jobs it creates and promoting policies to ensure the United States remains the premier global destination in which to invest, hire, innovate, and manufacture products;
(3) maintaining the U.S. commitment to open investment policy encourages other countries to reciprocate and enables the United States to open new markets abroad for U.S. companies and their products;
(4) U.S. policies regarding foreign direct investment should also reflect national security interests and should not disadvantage domestic investors or companies; and
(5) U.S. efforts to attract foreign direct investment should be consistent with efforts to maintain and improve the U.S. standard of living.

The bill would then require the Secretary of Commerce to conduct an interagency review of the U.S. global competitiveness in attracting foreign direct investment and report to Congress recommendations for increasing U.S. global competitiveness without weakening labor, consumer, financial, or environmental protections.

== Congressional Budget Office report ==
H.R. 2052 would direct the Secretary of Commerce, in coordination with other relevant agencies, to review the competitiveness of the United States in attracting investment by foreign businesses. Within one year of enactment of the bill, the Secretary would be required to report to the Congress the results of the review as well as recommendations for increasing the United States’ ability to attract foreign investment.

Based on information from the Department of Commerce, CBO estimates that implementing H.R. 2052 would cost about $1 million over the 2014-2018 period for staff and administrative activities involved in conducting the review and preparing the report. Enacting H.R. 2052 would not affect direct spending or revenues; therefore, pay-as-you-go procedures do not apply.

H.R. 2052 contains no intergovernmental or private-sector mandates as defined in the Unfunded Mandates Reform Act and would not affect the budgets of state, local, or tribal governments.

== Procedural history ==
=== House ===
The Global Investment in American Jobs Act of 2013 was introduced into the House by Rep. Lee Terry (R, NE-2) on May 20, 2013. It was referred to the United States House Committee on Energy and Commerce and the United States House Energy Subcommittee on Commerce, Manufacturing and Trade. Senior fellow Martin Neil Baily of the Brookings Institution testified before the subcommittee on April 18, 2013. The Committee on Energy and Commerce held mark up sessions on July 16 and 17, 2013, before voting to order to reported (amended) by unanimous consent on July 17, 2013. On September 9, 2013, the House voted in Roll Call Vote 448 to pass the bill 379–32.

=== Senate ===
The Global Investment in American Jobs Act of 2013 was received in the United States Senate on September 10, 2013.

== Debate and discussion ==
Representative Lee Terry was in favor of the bill because he believed it would help increase global competitiveness and economic success. Supporters argued that increased foreign direct investment would help job creation in the United States.

The Organization for International Investment was in favor of the bill.

== See also ==
- List of bills in the 113th United States Congress
- foreign direct investment
