= Martin Neil Baily =

American economist

Martin Baily
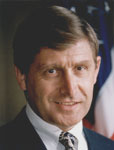

Chair of the Council of Economic Advisers
- In office August 12, 1999 – January 20, 2001
- President: Bill Clinton
- Preceded by: Janet Yellen
- Succeeded by: Glenn Hubbard

Personal details
- Born: March 29, 1949 (age 76) Exeter, England, UK
- Party: Democratic
- Spouse: Vickie Baily
- Children: 4
- Education: King's College, Cambridge (BA); Massachusetts Institute of Technology (MA, PhD)

Martin Neil Baily (born January 13, 1945) is an economist at the Brookings Institution and formerly at the Peterson Institute. He is best known for his work on productivity and competitiveness and for his tenure as a cabinet member during the Clinton Administration. He was one of three members of the Council of Economic Advisers from 1994 to 1996, and chairman of the council from 1999 to 2001. He currently co-chairs the Bipartisan Policy Center's Financial Regulatory Reform Initiative and serves as a senior advisor at Albright Stonebridge Group.

Baily was a senior fellow at the Brookings Institution (1979–89) and subsequently professor of economics at the University of Maryland (1989–96). He was vice chairman of a National Academy of Sciences – National Research Council panel investigating the effect of computers on productivity. Baily co-founded the microeconomics issues of the Brookings Papers on Economic Activity. He was a principal at McKinsey & Company's Global Institute (1996–99) and has been a senior adviser to McKinsey since 2002. He joined the board of The Phoenix Companies in 2005 and is an academic adviser to the Congressional Budget Office and associate editor of the Journal of Economic Perspectives.

Baily earned his Ph.D. in economics at the Massachusetts Institute of Technology (MIT) and his undergraduate degree at Cambridge University (UK), and taught at MIT and Yale University. He is the author of numerous books and articles and coauthor with Jacob Kirkegaard of Transforming the European Economy (2004).

== Activities ==
Congressional testimony:

- On April 18, 2013, Baily testified before the United States House Energy Subcommittee on Commerce, Manufacturing and Trade in a hearing about the Global Investment in American Jobs Act of 2013 (H.R. 2052; 113th Congress), which he was in favor of. The legislation would instruct the United States Department of Commerce to research and report to Congress about the possibilities for increasing foreign direct investment in the United States.

Political offices
Preceded by Janet Yellen	Chair of the Council of Economic Advisers; 1999–2001	Succeeded by Glenn Hubbard
