= Deepwater Horizon (disambiguation) =

Deepwater Horizon was a drilling rig that sank in the Gulf of Mexico on 22 April 2010.

Deepwater Horizon may also refer to:

- Deepwater Horizon (film), a 2016 American disaster drama film
- Deepwater Horizon explosion
- Deepwater Horizon oil spill

== See also ==
- Deepwater Horizon oil spill consequences (disambiguation)
