= Global Business Alliance =

American trade association for overseas companies operating in the United States

- Abbreviation: GBA
- Formation: 1990; 36 years ago
- Founded at: Washington, D.C.
- Type: Trade association
- Purpose: Advocacy for foreign companies operating in the United States
- Location: Washington, D.C., United States
- Region served: United States
- Members: 435 international companies (2025)
- President and CEO: Jonathan Samford
- Funding: Membership fees
- Website: globalbusiness.org

Global Business Alliance (GBA), formerly known as the Organization for International Investment (OFII), is an American trade association representing the interests of overseas corporations operating in the United States. GBA advocates for non-discriminatory treatment in the United States for its overseas member companies.

== History ==
The organization was established in 1990 as the Organization for International Investment (OFII) when a group of US subsidiaries of foreign-owned corporations worked together to fight a tax in global profits.

In 1994, the US Supreme Court ruled in favor of California against Barclays Bank, a foreign-based multinational corporation, by a vote of 7–2 (and by a vote of 9-0 against Colgate-Palmolive, a US-based multinational corporation) - sanctioning a state's right to tax the worldwide profits of a multinational corporation via unitary worldwide combined reporting and formulary apportionment. The original group included Nestle, Sony, Unilever, and four other non-US-based corporations.

As an advocate for non-discriminatory treatment, OFII served its member companies by monitoring and reporting new regulatory developments and by lobbying policymakers at the federal and state level. With over 150 member companies by 2006, OFII's membership base had a constituent relationship with nearly every politician in the United States.

OFII began using the term "insourcing" in 2004 to describe jobs created through foreign direct investment in the United States. Since then, the term has appeared regularly in government publications, including a Congressional Research Services report published in 2005 (and updated in 2008) and in publications on promoting international trade administration of the United States Department of Commerce.

The organization was rebranded as the Global Business Alliance around 2020.

== Issues ==
=== Inward foreign direct investment in the United States ===
Inward foreign direct investment (FDI) constitutes 13.6% of US GDP. According to the Bureau of Economic Analysis, the United States received $237 billion in FDI in 2007.

In 2006, US affiliates of majority-owned foreign companies employed over 5 million workers – 4.6% of US private sector industry employment. Between 2003 and 2007, over 3300 projects have yielded $184 billion in investment or about 447,000 new jobs. The activities of these companies comprise approximately 19 percent of all US exports ($169.2 billion). Approximately 60% of all inward FDI goes to the service sector, while 39% goes to manufacturing, and the remaining 1% is in agriculture. This investment constitutes 12% of overall private sector employment.

In addition to contributing to total employment, US affiliates of majority owned corporations remunerate their employees at a higher level than US firms. Wages for workers in this sector averaged $66,042, compared to the median income of $50,124 in other industries.

=== Inward foreign direct investment: mergers and acquisitions ===
In 2006, there was a total of $161.5 billion of new inward foreign direct investment in the United States. Of this, 91.5 percent was invested through mergers and acquisitions transactions.

In a report for the Organization for International Investment, Professor Matt Slaughter of the Tuck School of Business at Dartmouth cites three channels through which mergers and acquisitions create better performing firms:

- Revenues – Firms grow faster with new market opportunities often boosting employment and capital investment.
- Costs – Costs can be lowered because of operation at larger scale and realizing synergies from combining best practices across companies.
- Diversification – Gains can be realized, such as entering new markets and better managing ideas, internal capital markets, and risk.

When the rationale for completing a merger and acquisitions is to improve the bottom line of the above factors, Slaughter argues, significant advantages are possible. However, when firms expand to pursue goals other than profit maximization, the benefits of these transactions may be lost.

While constituting a smaller percentage of total inward foreign direct investment flows, new projects or "greenfield" investments contribute to economic growth. Since 2003, greenfield investments have increased 42 percent.

Greenfield projects are expected to create approximately 175,000 jobs from investments begun in 2003. Major investments come from Toyota Motor Company, the Hanjin Group, Adidas, Tata Motors, and Vodafone. Total investment is $109.5 billion.

In 2005, these companies spent $32 billion on research and development and $121 billion on plants and equipment.

== Legislation ==
Supported:

- Global Investment in American Jobs Act of 2013 (H.R. 2052; 113th Congress) – OFII supported this legislation, which would instruct the United States Department of Commerce to research and write a report on how the United States could increase its share of direct foreign investment.
  - The bill would aim to create more jobs in the U.S.
  - The chairman of the House subcommittee with jurisdiction over the bill said "the legislation would identify and eliminate barriers to new jobs and would help make the United States more competitive in attracting foreign investment."
