= Environmental impact of the Deepwater Horizon oil spill =

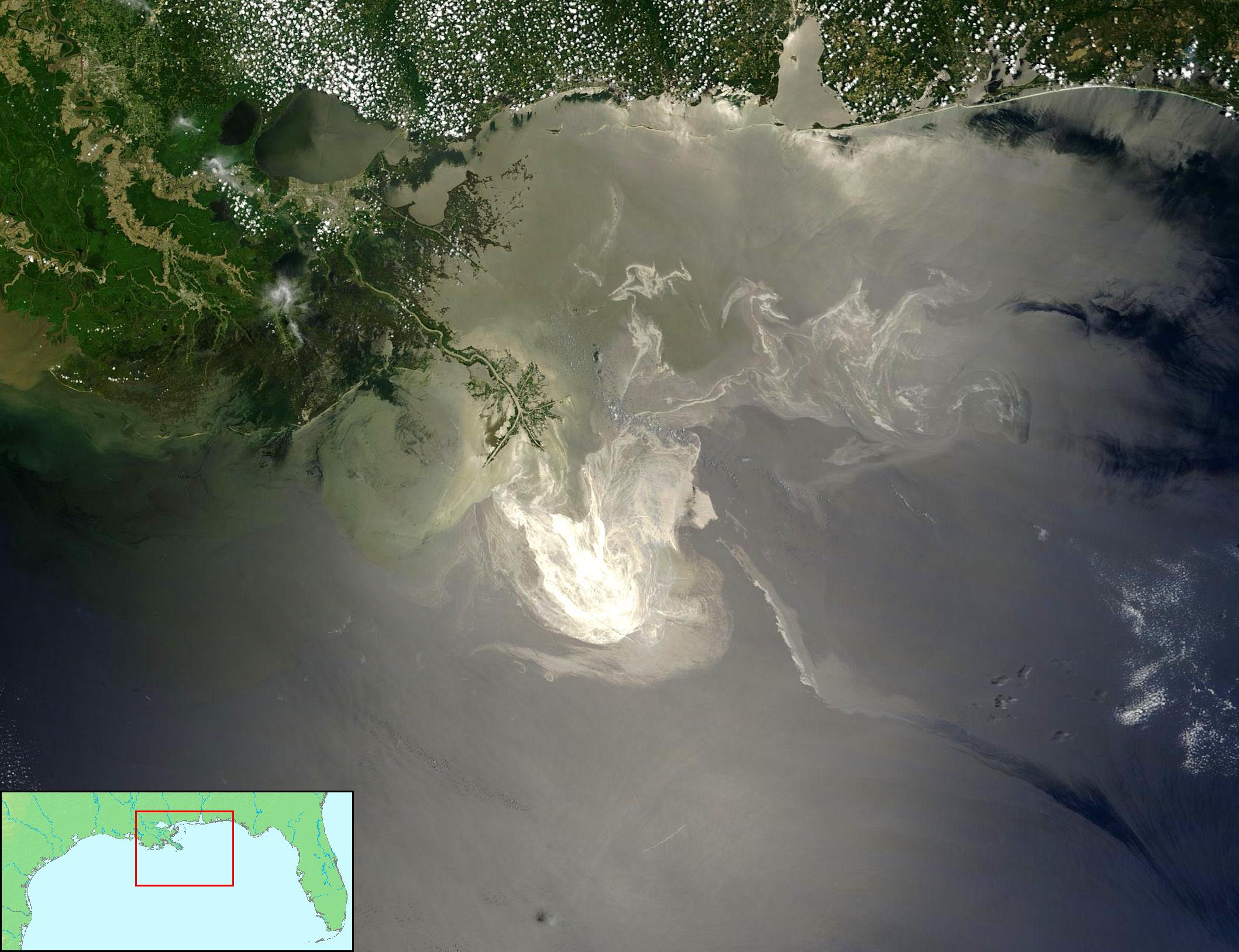
The oil slick as seen from space by NASA's Terra satellite on 24 May 2010

The 2010 Deepwater Horizon oil spill in the Gulf of Mexico has been described as the worst environmental disaster in the United States, releasing about 4.9 million barrels (210 million US gal; 780,000 m^{3}) of crude oil making it the largest marine oil spill in history. Both the spill and the cleanup efforts had effects on the environment.

The oil spill was called the "worst environmental disaster the US has faced" by White House energy adviser Carol Browner. The spill was by far the largest in US history, almost 20 times greater than the usual estimate of the Exxon Valdez oil spill. Factors such as petroleum toxicity, oxygen depletion and the use of Corexit are expected to be the main causes of damage.

== Impact to marine species ==
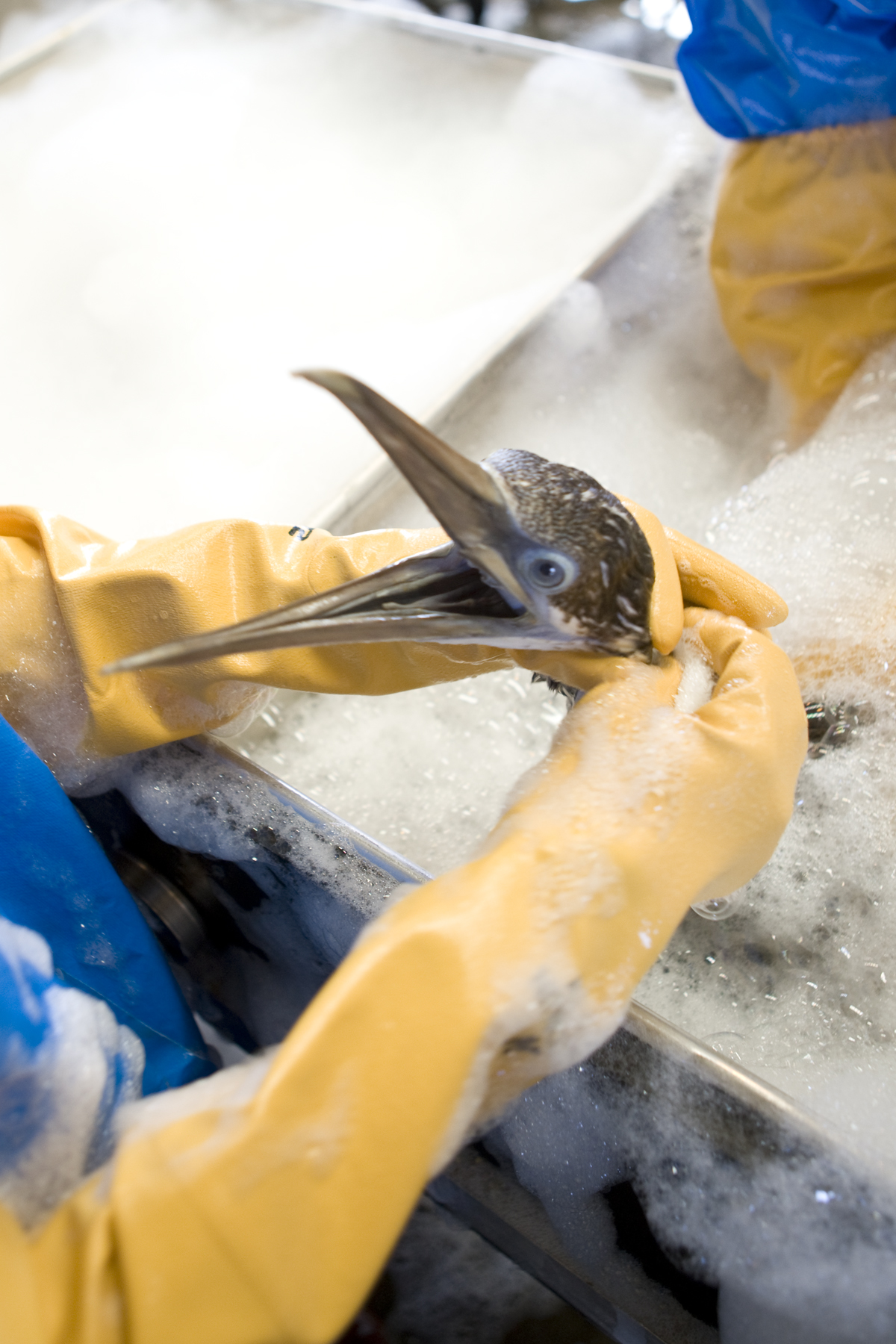
An oiled gannet seabird getting the oil washed off.

Most of the impact was on the marine species. Eight U.S. national parks were threatened and more than 400 species that live in the Gulf islands and marshlands are at risk, including the endangered Kemp's ridley turtle, the green turtle, the loggerhead turtle, the hawksbill turtle, and the leatherback turtle. In the national refuges most at risk, about 34,000 birds were counted, including gulls, pelicans, roseate spoonbills, egrets, terns, and blue herons. A comprehensive 2009 inventory of offshore Gulf species counted 15,700. The area of the spill includes 8,332 species, including more than 1,200 fish, 200 birds, 1,400 molluscs, 1,500 crustaceans, 4 sea turtles, and 29 marine mammals. In a 2011 paper in the journal BioScience, researchers from the University of New Hampshire reported that the spill threatened 39 marine species in addition to the 14 currently under federal protection. Threatened species, the report found, ranged from 'whale sharks to seagrass". Also another impact to marine species was the impact to various food chains. With one break in the chain, the rest of the chain could be impacted greatly.

Harry Roberts, a professor of Coastal Studies at Louisiana State University, has stated that 4 million barrels (640,000 m^{3}) of oil would be enough to "wipe out marine life deep at sea near the leak and elsewhere in the Gulf" as well as "along hundreds of miles of coastline." Mak Saito, an associate scientist at Woods Hole Oceanographic Institution indicated that such an amount of oil "may alter the chemistry of the sea, with unforeseeable results." Samantha Joye of the University of Georgia indicated that the oil could harm fish directly, and microbes used to consume the oil would reduce oxygen levels in the water. The ecosystem, she said, could require years or decades to recover, as with previous spills. Damage to the ocean floor would endanger the Louisiana pancake batfish in particular, whose range is entirely contained within the area affected by the spill.

The actual number of mammal deaths due to the spill may be as much as 50 times higher than the number of recovered carcasses, according to a study published in the Journal Conservation Letters. "The Deepwater oil spill was the largest in US history, however, the recorded impact on wildlife was relatively low, leading to suggestions that the environmental damage of the disaster was actually modest. This is because reports have implied that the number of carcasses recovered... equals the number of animals killed by the spill" stated Rob Williams from University of British Columbia.

=== Timeline ===
On 22 October 2010, it was reported that miles-long strings of weathered oil had been sighted moving toward marshes on the Mississippi River delta. Hundreds of thousands of migrating ducks and geese spend the winter in this delta. Two years after the Deepwater explosion, migratory birds were found to have carried chemicals from the spill to Minnesota. Preliminary evidence showed the vast majority of the small sample of pelican eggs tested contained "petroleum compounds and Corexit". As of 2 November 2010, 6,814 dead animals had been collected, including 6,104 birds, 609 sea turtles, 100 dolphins and other mammals, and 1 other reptile. According to the U.S. Fish and Wildlife Service, the cause of death had not been determined as of late June. According to NOAA, since 1 January 2011, 67 dead dolphins had been found in the area affected by the spill, with 35 of them premature or newborn calves.

An NOAA study in spring 2012, along with two other studies reported at the same time, suggests that the long-term environmental effects of the spill may have been "far more profound than previously thought". The joint study by NOAA and BP found "many of the 32 dolphins studied were underweight, anemic and suffering from lung and liver disease, while nearly half had low levels of a hormone that helps the mammals deal with stress as well as regulating their metabolism and immune systems". Researchers found that some types of spiders and other insects were far less numerous than before the spill.

During a January 2013 flyover, former NASA physicist, Bonny Schumaker noted a "dearth of marine life" in a radius of 30 to 50 miles (50 to 80 km) around the Macondo well. "Since the fall of 2011, now about 14 months, I see no turtles, few if any dolphins, few if any rays ... few sharks, few bait balls, all of the things we used to see," she commented. This may mean that the wildlife left the area in search of food. "I guess the Gulf of Mexico in these parts is a stinky, dead desert for its previous visitors," Schumaker told NBC news.

Three years after the oil spill, the residual effects were still apparent, with tar balls still found on the Mississippi coast, as well as an oil sheen along a coastal marsh, and erosion on an island in Barataria Bay sped up by the death of mangrove trees and marsh grass.

=== Corals ===
On February 26, federally funded scientists found damage to deep sea coral several miles from the well. Expedition leader and biologist with Penn State University Charles Fisher said there was "an abundance of circumstantial data" suggesting coral damage is related to the spill. This discovery indicated that the spill's ecological consequences may be greater than was previously officially claimed. "The visual data for recent and ongoing death are crystal clear and consistent over at least 30 colonies; the site is close to the Deepwater Horizon; the research site is at the right depth and direction to have been impacted by a deep-water plume, based on NOAA models and empirical data; and the impact was detected only a few months after the spill was contained."

In March 2012, definitive link was found between the death of a Gulf coral community the size of half a football field and the spill. The scientists wrote: "The presence of recently damaged and deceased corals beneath the path of a previously documented plume emanating from the Macondo well provides compelling evidence that the oil impacted deep-water ecosystems."

=== Effect to dolphins ===
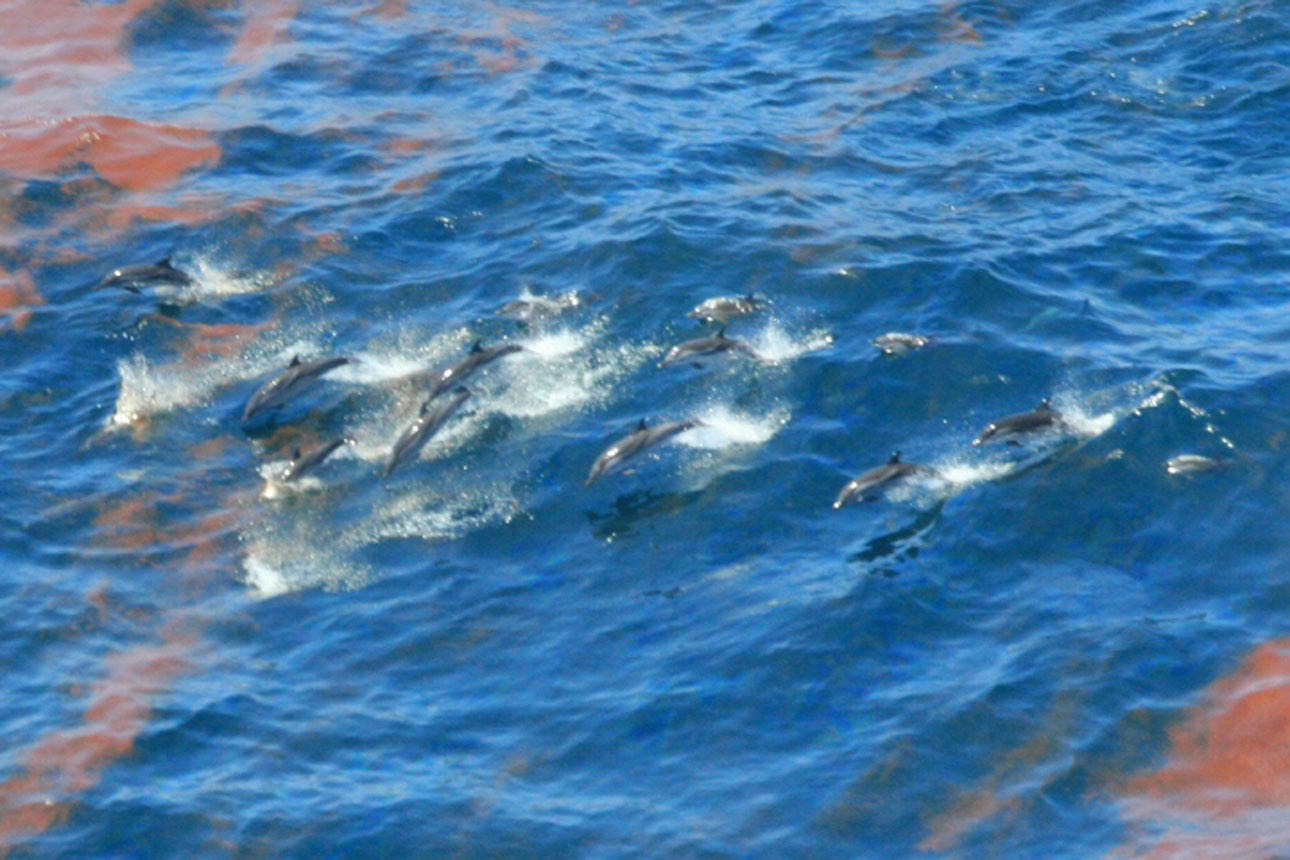
Striped dolphins (Stenella coeruleoalba)

In February 2011, the first birthing season for dolphins since the spill, the director of the Institute for Marine Mammal Studies in Gulfport reported that dead baby dolphins were washing up along the Mississippi and Alabama shorelines at about 10 times the normal number for the first two months of the year. "For some reason, they have started aborting or they were dead before they were born; the average is one or two a month. This year we have 17 and February is not even over yet."

From mid-January to late March 2011, scientists counted almost 200 dead dolphins in the Gulf, with another 90 in 2010. After investigating the deaths, NOAA put a gag order on the results, saying that the research is part of a criminal investigation of the spill. Numerous independent scientists said they have been "personally rebuked by federal officials for speaking out of turn to the media about efforts to determine the cause" of the deaths.

In April 2011, one year from the onset of the spill, scientists confirmed that they had discovered oil on dead dolphins found along the Gulf Coast. Fifteen of the 406 dolphins that had washed ashore in the last 14 months had oil on their bodies; the oil found on eight of them was linked to the spill. A NOAA spokesperson said it was "significant that even a year after the oil spill we are finding oil on the dolphins, the latest just two weeks ago." A NOAA study in the summer of 2011 showed dolphins that came in contact with the petroleum were "seriously ill" with drastically low weight, low blood sugar and for some, cancer of the liver and lungs.

In December 2013, the journal Environmental Science & Technology published a study finding that of 32 dolphins briefly captured from 24-km stretch near southeastern Louisiana, half were seriously ill or dying from liver disease, pneumonia, loss of teeth, and one pregnant female was carrying a dead fetus. The animals compared unfavorably with dolphins from an area of the gulf unaffected by the spill. BP said the report, which was the first study of the spill's impact on dolphins, was "inconclusive as to any causation associated with the spill".

On 12 April 2016, a research team reported that 88 percent of about 360 baby or stillborn dolphins within the spill area "had abnormal or under-developed lungs", compared to 15 percent in other areas. The study was published in the April 2016 Diseases of Aquatic Organisms.

=== Impact on marine life ===
In 2012 "disturbing numbers" of mutated fish were seen in the Gulf. Scientists and fishermen pointed to the spill, the dispersants and chemicals used in its cleanup as the cause of the deformities which include shrimp born without eyes, fish with lesions, fish with oozing sores and, according to a local fisherwoman, "We are also finding eyeless crabs, crabs with their shells soft instead of hard, full grown crabs that are one-fifth their normal size, clawless crabs, and crabs with shells that don't have their usual spikes ... they look like they've been burned off by chemicals". The dispersants are known to be mutagenic. In Barataria Bay, Louisiana, an area "heavily impacted by oil and dispersants", 50% of shrimp were found lacking eyes and eye sockets. Another lifelong fisher-woman reported seeing "fish without covers over their gills and others with large pink masses hanging off their eyes and gills". A 2014 study of the effects of the oil spill on bluefin tuna, published in the journal Science, found that oil already broken down by wave action and chemical dispersants was more toxic than fresh oil.

Prior to the spill, approximately 0.1% of Gulf fish had lesions or sores. A report from the University of South Florida said that many locations showed 20% of fish with lesions, and later expeditions some as high as 50%.

A 2014 paper in the journal Science found that toxins released by the oil spill killed fish by causing cardiac arrest. The study found that even very low concentrations of crude oil can slow the pace of fish heartbeats. The study was conducted by researchers at Stanford University and the National Oceanic and Atmospheric Administration as part of the federal Natural Resource Damage Assessment process required by the Oil Pollution Act. It focused on tuna partly because the spill occurred in an area where Atlantic bluefin tuna were spawning. The effects were considered especially problematic for fish embryos and early developing fish, because the heartbeat changes could affect the development of other organs, including the lungs and liver. BP disputed the study, raising questions about the study and the use of its findings in the damage assessment process. Another peer-reviewed study, released in March 2014 and conducted by 17 scientists from the United States and Australia and published in the Proceedings of the National Academy of Sciences, found that tuna and amber jack that were exposed to oil from the spill developed deformities of the heart and other organs. BP responded that the concentrations of oil in the study were a level rarely seen in the Gulf, but The New York Times reported that the BP statement was contradicted by the study.

In 2021, a new species of baleen whale known as Rice's whale (Balaenoptera ricei) was described. This species has a highly restricted range, currently only being known from a very small section of the northeastern Gulf of Mexico west of Florida and south of Alabama, and a population somewhere between several dozen individuals (if accounting for the current population) and 100 individuals (if accounting for unsurveyed areas of the Gulf that could hold undiscovered populations of the species). An analysis of the species found that Deepwater Horizon had likely previously devastated the population of the species and had led to it declining as much as 22%, due to the spill prompting reproductive failure in the few mature females of the population.

== Methane ==
Oceanographer John Kessler estimated that the crude gushing from the well contained approximately 40% methane by weight, compared to about 5% found in typical oil deposits. Methane can potentially suffocate marine life and create dead zones where oxygen is depleted. Oceanographer Dr. Ian MacDonald believes that the natural gas dissolving below the surface has the potential to reduce the Gulf oxygen levels and emit benzene and other toxic compounds.

== Entry to the food chain ==
Signs of an oil-and-dispersant mix were found under the shells of tiny blue crab larvae in the Gulf by researchers at Tulane University in 2010. This finding indicated that the use of dispersants had broken the oil into droplets small enough to easily enter the food chain. Marine biologists found "orange blobs" under the shells of crab larvae in "almost all" of the larvae collected from over 300 miles (480 km) of coastline stretching from Grand Isle, Louisiana, to Pensacola, Florida. According to a March 2012 study, spilled oil entered the ocean's food chain through zooplankton. Dr. Michael Roman of the University of Maryland Center for Environmental Science stated "traces of oil in the zooplankton prove that they had contact with the oil and the likelihood that oil compounds may be working their way up the food chain". Alabama researchers in July 2012 found that dispersants may have killed microscopic plankton and disrupted the food chain. Scientists commenting on the study, published in PLOS ONE, said it pointed toward "major future effects of the spill". One scientist called its findings "scary, though limited because the experiments spanned only five days". Carbon isotopic evidence has revealed that oil from the disaster has entered the bodies of land animals and birds (terrestrial fauna) leading to a reduction in the reproductive success of some species.

== Toxicity from polycyclic aromatic hydrocarbons ==
Terry Wade of Texas A&M University, Steven Lohrenz of the University of Southern Mississippi and the Stennis Space Center found evidence of the polycyclic aromatic hydrocarbons (PAH), which are often linked to oil spills, and include carcinogens and chemicals that pose various risks to human health, as deep as 3,300 feet (1.0 km) and as far away as 8 miles (13 km) in May 2010, and said it likely worsened as more oil spilled. The PAHs can kill animals immediately, in high enough concentrations, and can lead to cancer. "From the time that these observations were made, there was an extensive release of additional oil and dispersants at the site. Therefore, the effects on the deep sea ecosystem may be considerably more severe than supported by the observations reported here," the researchers wrote in the journal Geophysical Research Letters. PAH's, they said, include a group of compounds, with different types at different depths. "It is possible they dissipate quickly, but no one has yet showed this".

In September 2010, Oregon State University researchers found sharply heightened levels of chemicals in the waters off the coast of Louisiana in August 2010, the last sampling date, even after the well was capped one month prior. Near Grand Isle, Louisiana, the team discovered that PAH remained at levels 40 times higher than before the spill. The PAH's were most concentrated in the area near the Louisiana Coast, but levels also jumped 2–3 fold in other spill-affected areas off Alabama, Mississippi and Florida. As of August 2010, PAH levels remained near those discovered while the spill was still flowing heavily. Kim Anderson, a professor of environmental and molecular toxicology, said that based on the findings of other researchers, she suspected that the abundant use of dispersants by BP increased the bio-availability of the PAHs. "There was a huge increase of PAHs that are bio-available to the organisms – and that means they can essentially be uptaken by organisms throughout the food chain."

Dr. Jim Cowan of Louisiana State University's Department of Oceanography and Coastal Sciences, believes PAHs, weathered from leaked oil on the seabed, are likely the cause of the mutations.

A 2014 study of the effects of the oil spill on bluefin tuna, published in the journal Science, clarifying the mechanics by which PAH kill fish, found that the toxins from oil spills can cause irregular heartbeats leading to cardiac arrest. It found that PAHs block signaling pathways that allow potassium and calcium ions to flow in and out of cardiac cell membranes and sustain normal heart rates, and that even very low concentrations of crude oil can disrupt these signaling pathways, slowing fish heartbeats. The study found that cardiotoxicity might have been widespread in animal life exposed to the spill.

== Impact on beaches ==
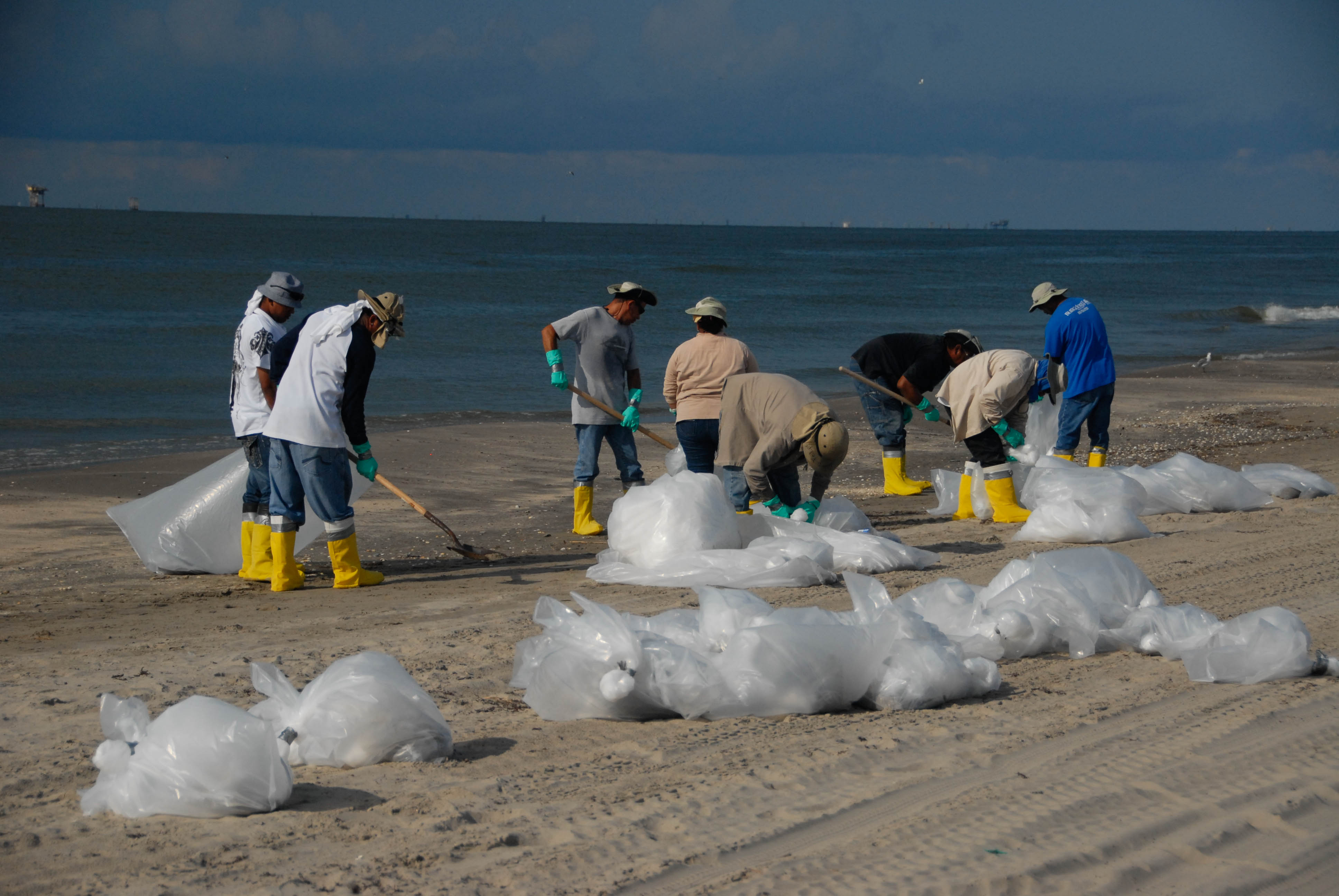
Workers cleaning up a beach during Deepwater Horizon oil spill

The oil from the disaster affected between 622 and 1300 miles of the United States coastline around the Gulf of Mexico and has acutely catalyzed the erosion of land due to the oil having led to the death of most of the marsh vegetation (flora). A 2012 study of the sands of the contaminated beaches and marshes showed that the variety of organisms, one of the lowest links in the food chain, had dropped dramatically since the spill. The remaining species are believed to be those that favor polluted conditions and that consume hydrocarbons. This could result in long-lasting effects to the ecosystem. The lead author said, "We went from this very diverse community with an abundance of different organisms to this really (impoverished) community that was really dominated by a couple of fungal species". The authors also expressed concerns that trace minerals and metals such as mercury and arsenic deposited by the oil may cause harm to both wildlife and humans.

The use of dispersant made oil sink faster and more deeply into the beaches, and possibly groundwater supplies, according to a November 2012 a study released by Florida State University and Utrecht University in the Netherlands. The researchers found that Corexit 9500A allowed the PAHs to permeate sand where, due to a lack of sunlight, degradation is slowed.

== Impact due to clean-up ==
The oil clean-up itself caused damage to the fragile environment. In Orange Beach Alabama, beach erosion and disruption of plant and animal life-cycles continued into 2011, despite repeated requests by the mayor and other local officials to leave the area. Clean-up crews deterred tourists from visiting local hotels and beaches due to an increase in criminal activity caused by the influx of clean-up workers.

== Impact on vegetation ==
Studies of vegetation death and accelerated marsh erosion following Deepwater Horizon oil spill have shown that both of these impacts (or "injuries," when assessing natural resource damages) can be related to the percent of oiling on the stems of marsh vegetation. Spatial quantification of these injuries thus relies on estimates of how many kilometers of shoreline fell into each of the four stem oiling categories on which these injury determinations were based (0–10%, 10–50%, 50–90%, 90–100%). The total length of the Louisiana coastline under mainland herbaceous marsh that was oiled was estimated to be 1,161 km, with 29% (334 km) falling into the two upper classes of stem oiling (i.e. > 50% stem oiling).

== Remaining oil in the water ==
In August 2010, scientists had determined as up to 79% of the spilled oil remained in the Gulf of Mexico, under the surface. In March 2011, it was reported that thousands of pounds of oil and dispersant were collected each day from highly visible resort areas and that 17,000 lb (7,700 kg) were collected from a beach in Alabama after a winter storm.

A Coast Guard report released on 17 December 2010, said that little oil remained on the sea floor except within a mile and a half (2.5 km) of the well. The report said that since 3 August 2010, only 1% of water and sediment samples had pollution above EPA-recommended limits. Charlie Henry of NOAA warned even small amounts of oil could cause "latent, long-term chronic effects". Ian R. MacDonald of Florida State University said even where the government claimed to find little oil, "We went to the same place and saw a lot of oil. In our samples, we found abundant dead animals."

After Hurricane Isaac in September 2012, about 565,000 pounds of oiled material traced to the spill was brought to land. This was a greater amount than had been collected in the eight months prior. The Louisiana Coastal Protection Agency criticized BP and the USCG clean-up efforts, calling for more resources to deal with the roughly 1 million barrels (160×10^{3} m^{3}) of oil believed to remain below water. Huge tar mats were also uncovered during the storm, prompting beach closures.

Although some researchers thought that the damage from the spill would rapidly resolve, three years into the recovery dolphins continue to die, fish are showing strange lesions, corals in the gulf have died and oil still remains in some marsh areas. Due to both its size and the way it was handled, there is little previous research to predict long-term effects. At the 2013 "Gulf of Mexico Oil Spill and Ecosystem Science Conference", oceanographer David Hollander presented data that showed as much as one-third of the oil released during the spill may still be in the gulf. Researchers described a phenomenon called "dirty blizzard": oil caused deep ocean sediments to clumped together, falling to the ocean floor at ten times the normal rate in an "underwater rain of oily particles". The result could have long-term effects on both humans and marine life. Commercially fished species feed on sediment creatures, meaning oil could remain in the food chain for generations. Concern was expressed for commercially fished species such as tilefish which burrow in the sediment and feed on sediment dwelling creatures.

In 2013, researchers found that a tiny amoeba-like creatures, foraminifera, that live in sediment and form the bottom of the gulf food chain, have died off in the areas that were affected by the underwater plumes that stretched out miles beyond the spill site. The foraminifera have returned in some areas but in other areas they have burrowed into the sediments, stirring them up all over again. Noting that it took several years for the herring population to crash following the Exxon Valdez oil spill, the researchers expressed concerns that it may also take years for long-terms effects to become apparent in the gulf.

== See also ==
- Environmental issues in the United States
- Environmental impact of the petroleum industry
- Health consequences of the Deepwater Horizon oil spill
