= Nokomis 3 =

Nokomis 3 is a blend of chemicals created by scientists in 1971, formulated to increase dispersion of oil spilled in bodies of water.

The synergetic formulation of chemicals is water-based and non-flammable. Nokomis 3 has been used by the United States Navy, State of California Fish and Game and the United States Environmental Protection Agency (EPA). Marlin Supply Inc. is the main distributor of this product with laboratories in San Francisco, Texas, Florida and Mexico. Nokomis 3 has been shown in studies to increase the rate of biodegradation of petroleum hydrocarbons with one study observing the degradation rate increased to 5.07 ± 0.37 mg L−1 day−1 from 2.39 ± 0.22 mg L−1 day−1.

When the product is released out of an airplane or aerial applied, it has an increased viscosity, which increases the chance for it to reach the ground.

This product is designed to clean up No. 2 Oil Fuel in bodies of water. Nokomis 3 is a base on the pH scale and is completely water soluble.

== Nokomis 3-AA ==
This product of Nokomis 3 is a water based colloid. Nokomis 3-AA can be applied through spray nozzles on workboats or ships. For best use, the propeller of the boats can be helpful with mixing the product into the water for the most effect.

== Nokomis 3-F4 ==
The second design of Nokomis 3 is the Nokomis 3-F4. It is made with a higher viscosity, increasing the chance that the full product will reach the water's surface. It is not always applied by plane but can also be sprayed through nozzles to the top of the water's surface. Depending on the situation and the size of the oil spill, it can be applied either diluted or at full strength.

== See also ==
- Oil spill
- Crude oil
- Bioremediation
- Microorganisms
- Biological agent
