= Deep Waters =

Deep Waters may refer to:

- "Deep Waters" (short story), a 1910 short story by P.G. Wodehouse
- Deep Waters (book) a 1967 collection of stories by William Hope Hodgson
- Deep Waters (1948 film), a drama
- Deep Waters (1920 film), a lost American silent drama
- "Deep Waters" (A Touch of Frost), a 1996 television episode
- "Deep Waters," a song by Dirty Three from their 1998 album Ocean Songs
