= Ian MacDonald (oceanographer) =

American oceanographer

Ian R. MacDonald is a Professor of Biological Oceanography at Florida State University. In his research, he uses imaging and GIS techniques to investigate the ecology of deep-sea hydrocarbon seeps, primarily in the Gulf of Mexico. He was among the scientists to question the size of the Deepwater Horizon oil spill, the largest oil spill in U.S. history. Dr. MacDonald used satellite imagery to challenge estimates of the size of the spill by BP and U.S. governmental scientists, and to produce independent scientific evidence of the spill's significance, which BP and the U.S. governmental scientists eventually confirmed. He holds a Ph.D. in Oceanography from Texas A&M University.
