= Deepwater trilogy =

Science fiction book series by Ken Catra

First editions (publ. Tui)

The Deepwater trilogy is a series of science fiction novels written by New Zealand author Ken Catran. The three books are titled Deepwater Black (1992), Deepwater Landing (1993) and Deepwater Angels (1994). The series addresses a number of current issues like pollution, racism and politics. The most prominent theme throughout the series is that "survival is not for oneself but for a greater cause". Other notable themes and elements include beauty, color, light amidst darkness, responsibility at a young age, the significance of youth in the ongoing existence of the human race, rebellion, and fear of the unknown.

== Deepwater Black ==
The novel follows Robbie Mikkelson, an ordinary 13-year-old boy who goes to school, plays hockey and occasionally dodges the school bullies. He lives with his mom and dad, older sister Sarah and younger brother David. He goes to school with kids like Denie Miles, Meatgrinder and Reeboks. Everything is relatively simple until Yoona, a girl in a gray tracksuit, appears in his life.

The multicolored girl, whom no-one else can see, tells Robbie about things he doesn't understand, and that he's needed on Deepwater. Before he can respond, he's warped away from everything he's ever known, to discover that he is Reb, second in charge of a sky-scraper sized spaceship, the same person, yet different and told that his life on Earth is only a dream. He is now in charge of Deepwater along with Yoona, Bren, Gret, Lis and Zak, all of them descendants of colonists of the Solar System. Worn out from long shifts of duty in order to stay alive, these teenagers are fighting trites, amebs, solunks and mag-mets. There is also a "Jel" a dangerous, seemingly live substance that lives deep in the ship's ventilation shafts. Robbie is forced to live two lives, zooming back to Earth whenever the prexes hit him, his Deepwater life becoming more and more real. To complicate things, distrust among the ship's crew slowly grows out of control and questions about their own identity are answered by only bigger riddles.

== Deepwater Landing (1993) ==
The novel follows Denie Miles, who finds herself on Deepwater as Cei, having woken from one of two caskets that had remained closed in Deepwater Black when the other six opened. Deepwater had returned to space, searching for the one necessary ingredient to complete its mission. Enemies from the past return to follow her back to Earth, where a woman named Chibbi Orduna helps her to get some answers. Across the gulf of space, there are enemies waiting at their destination.

== Deepwater Angels ==
When Conn, an Earthkid, wakes to find himself on Deepwater, the spaceship is stranded on Earth. Life is beginning anew, however, Deepwater has to complete one final mission, right here on home territory.

== Adaptation ==
The trilogy was adapted as the Sci Fi Channel's first original scripted television series in 1997 under the name Mission Genesis. The series was a co-production between YTV Network and USA Networks, and was distributed by Sunbow Entertainment. In Canada and the United Kingdom, the series retained the original title, Deepwater Black.
