= Benzene in soft drinks =

Concern due to possible contamination

Benzene in soft drinks is of potential concern due to the carcinogenic nature of the molecule. This contamination is a public health concern and has caused significant outcry among environmental and health advocates. Benzene levels are regulated in drinking water nationally and internationally, and in bottled water in the United States, but only informally in soft drinks. The benzene forms from decarboxylation of the preservative benzoic acid in the presence of ascorbic acid (vitamin C) and metal ions (iron and copper) that act as catalysts, especially under heat and light. Hot peppers naturally contain vitamin C ("nearly as much as in one orange") so the observation about soft drinks applies to pepper sauces containing sodium benzoate, like Texas Pete.

== Formation in soft drinks ==
The major cause of benzene in soft drinks is the decarboxylation of benzoic acid in the presence of ascorbic acid (vitamin C, E300) or erythorbic acid (a diastereomer of ascorbic acid, E315). Benzoic acid is often added to drinks as a preservative in the form of its salts sodium benzoate (E211), potassium benzoate (E 212), or calcium benzoate (E 213). Citric acid is not thought to induce significant benzene production in combination with benzoic acid, but some evidence suggests that in the presence of ascorbic or erythorbic acid and benzoic acid, citric acid may accelerate the production of benzene.

The proposed mechanism begins with hydrogen abstraction by the hydroxyl radical, which itself is produced by the Cu^{2+}-catalysed reduction of dioxygen by ascorbic acid:

Other factors that affect the formation of benzene are heat and light. Storing soft drinks in warm conditions speeds up the formation of benzene.

Calcium disodium EDTA and sugars have been shown to inhibit benzene production in soft drinks.

The International Council of Beverages Associations (ICBA) has produced advice to prevent or minimize benzene formation.

== Limit standards in drinking water ==
Various authorities have set limits on benzene content in drinking water. The following limits are given in parts per billion (ppb; μg/kg).

- World Health Organization (WHO): 10 ppb (WHO notes that benzene should be avoided whenever technically feasible.)
- Republic of Korea (South Korea): 10 ppb
- Canada: 5 ppb
- United States: federal limit: 5 ppb; state limits in California, Connecticut, New Jersey, and Florida: 1 ppb
- European Union: 1 ppb

The EPA and California have set public health goals for benzene of 0 ppb and 0.15 ppb.

== Environmental exposure to benzene ==
Benzene in soft drinks has to be seen in the context of other environmental exposure. Taking the worst example found to date of a soft drink containing 87.9 ppb benzene, someone drinking a 350 ml (12 oz) can would ingest 31 μg (micrograms) of benzene, almost equivalent to the benzene inhaled by a motorist refilling a fuel tank for three minutes. While there are alternatives to using sodium benzoate as a preservative, the casual consumption of such a drink is unlikely to pose a significant health hazard to a particular individual (see, for example, the EPA IRIS document on benzene).

The UK Food Standards Agency has stated that people would need to drink at least 20 litres (5.5 gal) per day of a drink containing benzene at 10 μg to equal the amount of benzene they would breathe from city air every day. Daily personal exposure to benzene is determined by adding exposure from all sources.

- Air: A European study found that people breathe in 220 μg of benzene every day due to general atmospheric pollution. A motorist refilling a fuel tank for three minutes would inhale a further 32 μg. The estimated daily exposure from "automobile-related activities" is 49 μg and for driving for one hour is 40 μg.
- Smoking: For smokers, cigarette smoking is the main source of exposure to benzene. Estimates are 7900 μg per day (smoking 20 cigarettes per day), 1820 μg/day, and 1800 μg/day.
- Passive smoking: Benzene intake from passive smoking is estimated at 63 μg/day (Canada) and 50 μg/day.
- Diet and drinking water: 0.2 to 3.1 μg per day.

== History ==
=== 1990s ===
In 1990, a study reported having found benzene in bottles of Perrier for sale in the United States, resulting in a voluntary product recall.

In the early 1990s, the soft drink industry initially approached FDA with concerns about benzene formation in soft drinks. Following testing, FDA asked manufacturers to voluntarily reformulate. By 1993, FDA determined that most drinks had little benzene contamination.

In 1993, research showed how benzene can form from benzoic acid in the presence of vitamin C.

In the summer of 1998, a number of well known soft drinks manufacturers had to withdraw large quantities of their products from sale after benzene contamination in some production plants was discovered.

=== 2005 ===
In November 2005, the FDA received test results conducted by private citizens that benzene was forming at low levels in several types of beverages.

In December 2005, Germany's Federal Institute for Risk Assessment (Bundesinstitut für Risikobewertung) published a review of benzene's possible formation in foods and drinks.

=== 2006 ===
In February 2006, an unnamed former chemist at the FDA publicly revealed that benzene may be created as part of a chemical reaction during production of soft drinks, particularly those having an orange flavor. Full-scale investigations immediately started at the Food Standards Agency (UK) and in Germany to reveal exactly which amounts of benzene, if any, were present, with several other organizations awaiting their findings.

The United Kingdom's Food Standards Agency released results on March 31, 2006 for 150 beverages. Its results showed 43 beverages contained benzene, four of which contained levels above the World Health Organization drinking water standards (10 ppb). These four were withdrawn from sale.

In April 2006, the Korea Food & Drug Administration (KFDA) announced that it had detected benzene in 27 out of 30 (90%) vitamin-enriched drinks on sale in South Korea. It said the detected amount of benzene – ranging from 5.7 to 87.8 ppb – was not harmful to humans but advised manufacturers of beverages containing more than 10 ppb of benzene to voluntarily recall their products.

The FDA released preliminary results in May 2006 for 100 beverages showing that many soft drinks contained low levels of benzene (less than 5 ppb, the federal drinking water limit) while four drinks contained amounts above the standard. Two of these drinks contained amounts 15-18 times above the drinking water standard. Many of the products showed large variations in the amount of benzene they contained. The FDA stated that it is working with manufacturers to reformulate products that contain benzene above the federal drinking water standard.

These test results are both lower and more accurate than a previous long-term study by the FDA. In the Total Diet Study that FDA conducted from 1996 - 2001 to determine the amounts of volatile organic compounds in various foods, FDA used an analytical procedure that caused more benzene to form in the drinks during the test.

The FDA emphasized that most beverages contain levels below 5 ppb and pose no risk to consumers. Furthermore, there are no standards for beverages beyond drinking and bottled water.

On 9 June 2006, Health Canada released its study results of benzene levels in beverages. Four products out of 118 had levels above the Canadian guideline of five micrograms per liter for benzene in drinking water (average range 6.0 to 23.0 μg/L). The follow-up study the next year found only three samples with marginally higher levels and concluded the average levels were quite low.

On 24 August 2006, two soft drink manufacturers agreed to settle a class-action lawsuit that had been filed by a group of parents in the Superior Court of the District of Columbia. The two companies, Zone Brands Inc., maker of "BellyWashers" products, and TalkingRain Beverage Co., denied that their products were harmful, but agreed to change the ingredients in their drinks.

=== 2008 ===
Coca-Cola announced that it would be phasing out sodium benzoate from many of its drinks, but not Fanta and Sprite. As of August 2012, Coca-Cola Zero and Barq's root beer still contained benzoate (added as potassium salt and sodium salt respectively).

A Belgian study found that plastic packaging may play an important role in the formation of benzene in soft drinks.
