= Toluene toxicity =

- Chemical structure of toluene
- Specialty: Emergency medicine

Toluene toxicity refers to the harmful effects caused by toluene on the body.

== Metabolism in humans ==
While a significant amount of toluene, 25%–40%, is exhaled unchanged via the lungs, a greater proportion is metabolised and excreted via other pathways. The primary route of toluene metabolism is by hydroxylation to benzyl alcohol by members of the cytochrome P450 (CYP) superfamily. There are five CYPs which are important in toluene metabolism, CYP1A2, CYP2B6, CYP2E1, CYP2C8, and CYP1A1. The first four seem to be involved in the hydroxylation of toluene to benzyl alcohol. CYP2E1 seems to be the primary enzyme in the hydroxylation of toluene, accounting for roughly 44% of toluene metabolism; however, there is a great deal of ethnic variability: in the Finnish population, for example, the primary enzyme is CYP2B6. CYP2E1 catalyses the formation of benzyl alcohol and p-cresol, while CYP2B6 produces comparatively little p-cresol.

It is believed that in humans, benzyl alcohol is metabolised to benzaldehyde by CYP rather than alcohol dehydrogenase; however, this belief does not appear to be universal. Benzaldehyde is in turn metabolised to benzoic acid, primarily by mitochondrial aldehyde dehydrogenase-2 (ALDH-2), while only a small percentage is metabolised by cytosolic ALDH-1.

Benzoic acid is metabolised to either benzoyl glucuronide or hippuric acid. Benzoyl glucuronide is produced by the reaction of benzoic acid with glucuronic acid, which accounts for 10–20% of benzoic acid elimination. Hippuric acid is also known as benzoylglycine and is produced from benzoic acid in two steps: first benzoic acid is converted to benzoyl-CoA by the enzyme benzoyl-CoA synthase; then benzoyl-CoA is converted to hippuric acid by benzoyl-CoA:glycine N-acyltransferase. Hippuric acid is the primary urinary metabolite of toluene.

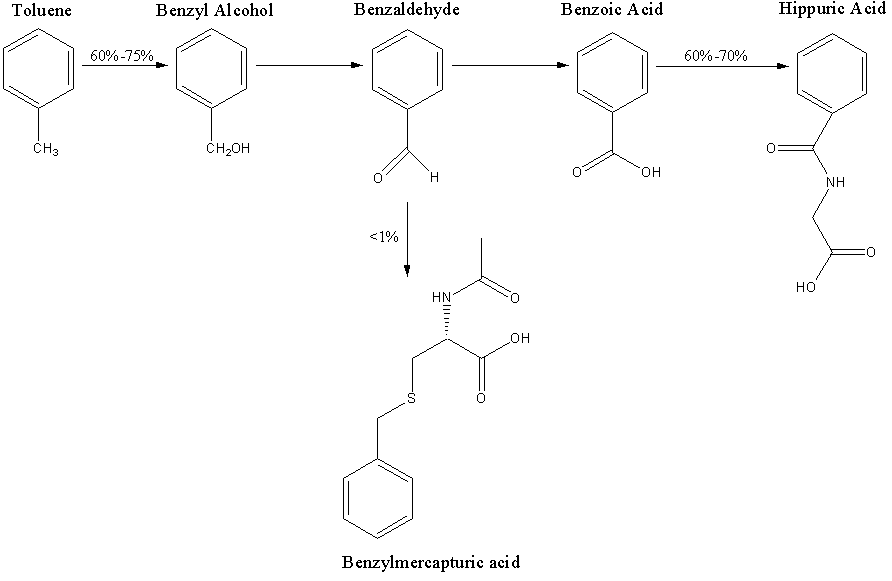

Ring hydroxylation to cresols is a minor pathway in the metabolism of toluene. The majority of the cresol is excreted unchanged in urine; however, some of the p-cresol and o-cresol is excreted as a conjugate. Studies in rats have shown that p-cresol is primarily conjugated with glucuronide to produce p-cresylglucuronide, though this may not be applicable to humans. o-cresol appears to be excreted mostly unchanged in urine or as the glucuronide or sulfate conjugate. There appears to be some dispute over whether m-cresol is produced as a metabolite of toluene or not.

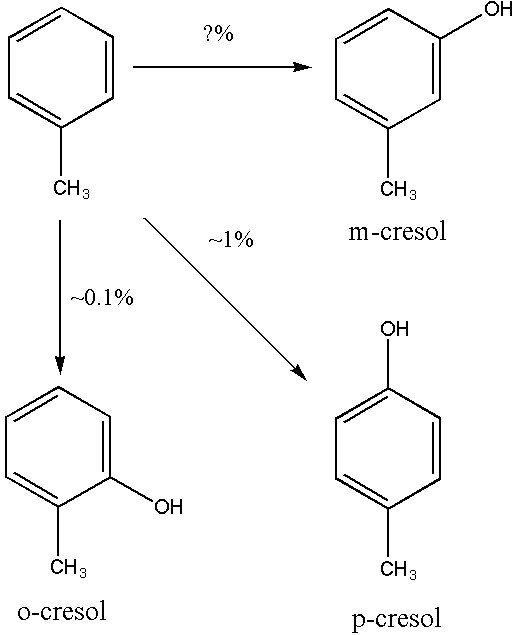

== Environmental influences ==
When exposure to toluene occurs there is usually simultaneous exposure to several other chemicals. Often toluene exposure occurs in conjunction with benzene and since they are to some degree metabolised by the same enzymes, the relative concentrations will determine their rate of elimination. Of course the longer it takes for toluene to be eliminated the more harm it is likely to do.

The smoking and drinking habits of those exposed to toluene will partially determine the elimination of toluene. Studies have shown that even a modest amount of acute ethanol consumption can significantly decrease the distribution or elimination of toluene from the blood resulting in increased tissue exposure. Other studies have shown that chronic ethanol consumption can enhance toluene metabolism via the induction of CYP2E1. Smoking has been shown to enhance the elimination rate of toluene from the body, perhaps as a result of enzyme induction.

The diet can also influence toluene elimination. Both a low-carbohydrate diet and fasting have been shown to induce CYP2E1 and as a result increase toluene metabolism. A low protein diet may decrease total CYP content and thereby reduce the elimination rate of the drug.

== Measure of exposure ==
Hippuric acid has long been used as an indicator of toluene exposure; however, there appears to be some doubt about its validity. There is significant endogenous hippuric acid production by humans; which shows inter- and intra-individual variation influenced by factors such as diet, medical treatment, alcohol consumption, etc. This suggests that hippuric acid may be an unreliable indicator of toluene exposure. It has been suggested that urinary hippuric acid, the traditional marker of toluene exposure is simply not sensitive enough to separate the exposed from the non-exposed. This has led to the investigation of other metabolites as markers for toluene exposure.

Urinary o-cresol may be more reliable for the biomonitoring of toluene exposure because, unlike hippuric acid, o-cresol is not found at detectable levels in unexposed subjects. o-Cresol may be a less sensitive marker of toluene exposure than hippuric acid. o-Cresol excretion may be an unreliable method for measuring toluene exposure because o-cresol makes up <1% of total toluene elimination.

Benzylmercapturic acid, a minor metabolite of toluene, is produced from benzaldehyde. In more recent years, studies have suggested the use of urinary benzylmercapturic acid as the best marker for toluene exposure, because: it is not detected in non-exposed subjects; it is more sensitive than hippuric acid at low concentrations; it is not affected by eating or drinking; it can detect toluene exposure down to approximately 15 ppm; and it shows a better quantitative relationship with toluene than hippuric acid or o-cresol.

== Effects of long-term exposure ==
Serious adverse behavioural effects are often associated with chronic occupational exposure and toluene abuse related to the deliberate inhalation of solvents. Long-term toluene exposure is often associated with effects such as: psychoorganic syndrome; visual evoked potential (VEP) abnormality; toxic polyneuropathy, cerebellar, cognitive, and pyramidal dysfunctions; optic atrophy; hearing disorders and brain lesions.

The neurotoxic effects of long-term use (in particular repeated withdrawals) of toluene may cause postural tremors by downregulating GABA receptors within the cerebellar cortex. Treatment with GABA agonists such as benzodiazepines provide some relief from toluene-induced tremor and ataxia. An alternative to drug treatment is ventral intermediate nucleus (vim) thalamotomy. The tremors associated with toluene misuse do not seem to be a transient symptom, but an irreversible and progressive symptom which continues after solvent abuse has been discontinued.

There is some evidence that low-level toluene exposure may cause disruption in the differentiation of astrocyte precursor cells. This does not appear to be a major hazard to adults; however, exposure of pregnant women to toluene during critical stages of fetal development could cause serious disruption to neuronal development.
