= Ethyl benzoate =

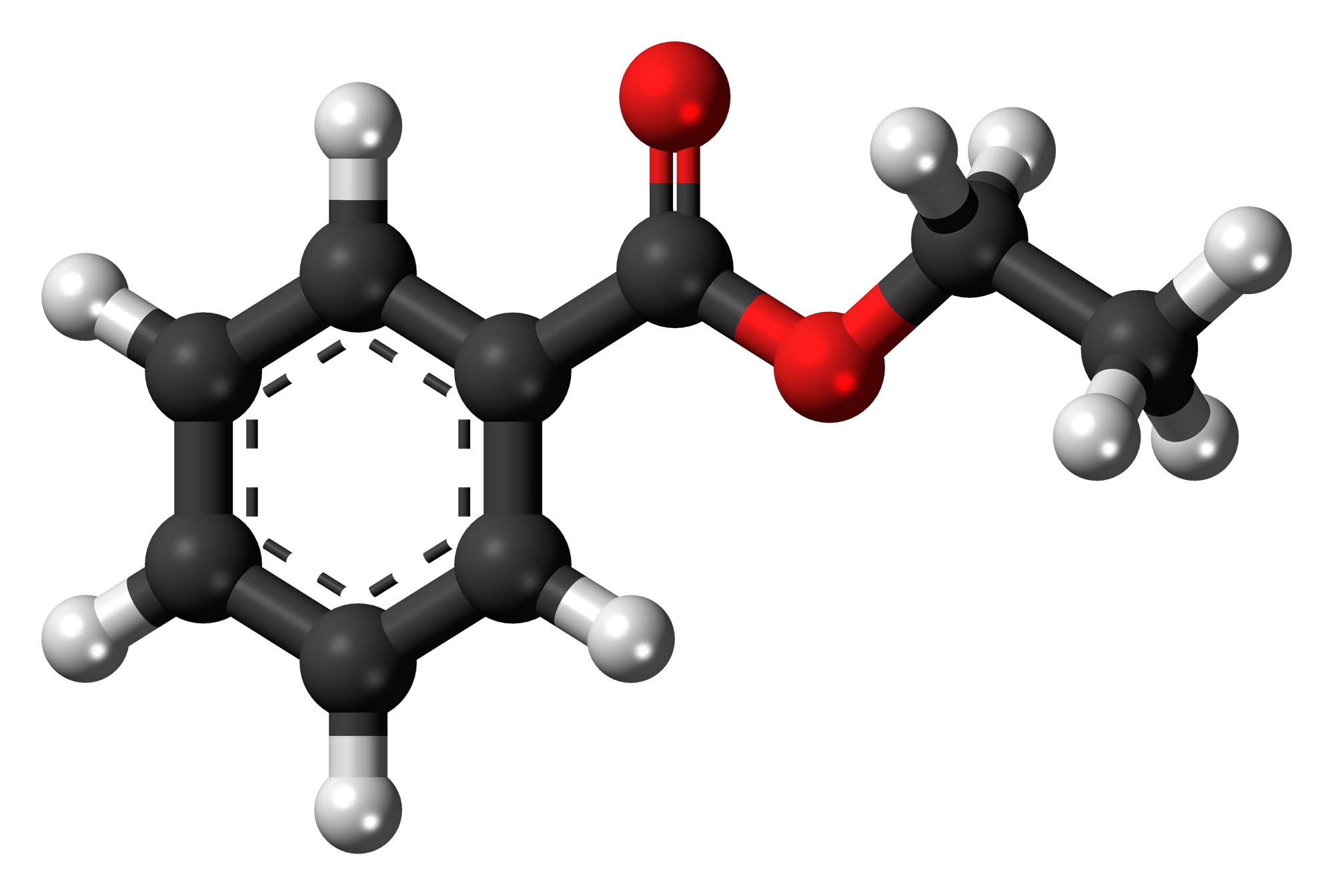

Names
- Preferred IUPAC name Ethyl benzoate

Identifiers
CAS Number	93-89-0
3D model (JSmol)	Interactive image
ChEBI	CHEBI:156074
ChEMBL	ChEMBL510714
ChemSpider	6897
ECHA InfoCard	100.002.078
EC Number	202-284-3
PubChem CID	7165
UNII	J115BRJ15H
CompTox Dashboard (EPA)	DTXSID3038696
- InChI: InChI=1S/C9H10O2/c1-2-11-9(10)8-6-4-3-5-7-8/h3-7H,2H2,1H3 Key: MTZQAGJQAFMTAQ-UHFFFAOYSA-N; InChI=1/C9H10O2/c1-2-11-9(10)8-6-4-3-5-7-8/h3-7H,2H2,1H3 Key: MTZQAGJQAFMTAQ-UHFFFAOYAI
- SMILES: O=C(OCC)c1ccccc1

Properties
Chemical formula	C_{9}H_{10}O_{2}
Molar mass	150.177 g·mol^{−1}
Appearance	colorless liquid
Density	1.050 g/cm^{3}
Melting point	−34 °C (−29 °F; 239 K)
Boiling point	211–213 °C (412–415 °F; 484–486 K)
Solubility in water	0.72 mg/mL
log P	2.64
Magnetic susceptibility (χ)	−93.32×10^{−6} cm^{3}/mol

Hazards
- GHS labelling
Pictograms	(GHS07: Exclamation mark) (GHS09: Environmental hazard)
Signal word	Warning
Hazard statements	H315, H319, H411
Precautionary statements	P264, P273, P280, P302+P352, P305+P351+P338, P321, P332+P313, P337+P313, P362, P391, P501

Related compounds
Related compounds	Methyl benzoate; Propyl benzoate
- Except where otherwise noted, data are given for materials in their standard state (at 25 °C [77 °F], 100 kPa). verify (what is ?) Infobox references

Ethyl benzoate, C_{9}H_{10}O_{2}, is an ester formed by the condensation of benzoic acid and ethanol. It is a colorless liquid that is almost insoluble in water, but miscible with most organic solvents.

As with many volatile esters, ethyl benzoate has a pleasant odor described as sweet, wintergreen, fruity, medicinal, cherry and grape. It is a component of some fragrances and artificial fruit flavors.

== Preparation ==
A simple and commonly used method for the preparation of ethyl benzoate in the laboratory is the acidic esterification of benzoic acid with ethanol and sulfuric acid as catalyst:
