= C12H15NO3S =

The molecular formula C_{12}H_{15}NO_{3}S (molar mass: 253.32 g/mol, exact mass: 253.0773 u) may refer to:

- Benzylmercapturic acid
- Thiorphan
