= Benzoyl fluoride =

Identifiers
CAS Number	455-32-3
3D model (JSmol)	Interactive image
ChemSpider	61314
ECHA InfoCard	100.006.587
EC Number	207-244-9
PubChem CID	67999
UNII	LOR25I34HD
CompTox Dashboard (EPA)	DTXSID5060019
- InChI: InChI=1S/C7H5FO/c8-7(9)6-4-2-1-3-5-6/h1-5H Key: HPMLGNIUXVXALD-UHFFFAOYSA-N
- SMILES: C1=CC=C(C=C1)C(=O)F

Properties
Chemical formula	C_{7}H_{5}FO
Molar mass	124.114 g·mol^{−1}
Appearance	colorless liquid
Density	1.14 g/cm^{3}
Melting point	−28 °C
Boiling point	160 °C
Solubility in water	hydrolysis

Hazards
- GHS labelling
Pictograms	(GHS02: Flammable) (GHS05: Corrosive)
Signal word	Danger
Hazard statements	H226, H314
Precautionary statements	P210, P233, P240, P241, P242, P243, P260, P264, P280, P301+P330+P331, P302+P361+P354, P303+P361+P353, P304+P340, P305+P354+P338, P316, P321, P363, P370+P378, P403+P235, P405, P501
- Except where otherwise noted, data are given for materials in their standard state (at 25 °C [77 °F], 100 kPa). Infobox references

Benzoyl fluoride is an organic, aromatic compound of carbon, hydrogen, fluorine, and oxygen. It is the acyl fluoride of benzoic acid; its chemical formula is C_{7}H_{5}FO. It was initially isolated by Alexander Borodin in 1863.

== Synthesis ==
Benzoyl fluoride can be prepared by the reaction of benzoyl chloride or benzoic anhydride with potassium fluoride, or by using trifluorotoluene as a precoursor in presence of niobium pentoxide as a catalyst.

== Chemical properties ==
Benzoyl fluoride hydrolyzes in water to benzoic acid and reacts with alkalis to form salts:

C_{6}H_{5}COF + H_{2}O → C_{6}H_{5}COOH + HF
C_{6}H_{5}COF + 2NaOH → C_{6}H_{5}COONa + NaF + H_{2}O

== Physical properties ==
Benzoyl fluoride is a colorless liquid that is soluble in ethanol, diethyl ether, and acetone.

== Uses ==
The compound can be used as an ionic liquid and as a silicone depolymerization agent.

== See also ==
- Benzoyl chloride
