= Propyl benzoate =

- Propyl benzoate

Names
- Preferred IUPAC name Propyl benzoate
- Other names n-propyl benzoate, benzoic acid propyl ester

Identifiers
CAS Number	2315-68-6
3D model (JSmol)	Interactive image
ChEBI	CHEBI:156072
ChemSpider	15965
ECHA InfoCard	100.017.292
EC Number	219-020-8
PubChem CID	16846
UNII	VWK210B7WS
CompTox Dashboard (EPA)	DTXSID4044878
- InChI: InChI=1S/C10H12O2/c1-2-8-12-10(11)9-6-4-3-5-7-9/h3-7H,2,8H2,1H3 Key: UDEWPOVQBGFNGE-UHFFFAOYSA-N; InChI=1/C10H12O2/c1-2-8-12-10(11)9-6-4-3-5-7-9/h3-7H,2,8H2,1H3 Key: UDEWPOVQBGFNGE-UHFFFAOYAH
- SMILES: O=C(OCCC)c1ccccc1

Properties
Chemical formula	C_{10}H_{12}O_{2}
Molar mass	164.204 g·mol^{−1}
Appearance	colorless oily liquid, nutty odor
Density	1.0230 g/cm^{3} at 20 °C
Melting point	−51.6 °C (−60.9 °F; 221.6 K)
Boiling point	230 °C (446 °F; 503 K)
Solubility in water	insoluble
Solubility	miscible with ethanol, diethyl ether
Magnetic susceptibility (χ)	−105.00·10^{−6} cm^{3}/mol

Hazards
Flash point	98 °C (208 °F; 371 K)
Safety data sheet (SDS)	External MSDS

Related compounds
Related compounds	Methyl benzoate Ethyl benzoate
- Except where otherwise noted, data are given for materials in their standard state (at 25 °C [77 °F], 100 kPa). verify (what is ?) Infobox references

Propyl benzoate is an organic chemical compound used as a food additive. It is an ester.

== Uses ==
Propyl benzoate has a nutty odor and sweet fruity or nut-like taste, and as such, it is used as a synthetic flavoring agent in foods. It also has antimicrobial properties and is used as a preservative in cosmetics. It occurs naturally in the sweet cherry and in clove stems, as well as in butter.

== Reactions ==
Propyl benzoate can be synthesized by the transesterification of methyl benzoate with propanol. Propyl benzoate can also be synthesized by means of Fischer esterification of benzoic acid with propanol.
