= Streptomyces sclerotialus =

Scientific classification
- Domain: Bacteria
- Kingdom: Bacillati
- Phylum: Actinomycetota
- Class: Actinomycetes
- Order: Streptomycetales
- Family: Streptomycetaceae
- Genus: Streptomyces
- Species: S. sclerotialus

Binomial name
- Streptomyces sclerotialus Pridham 1970

Type strain
- ATCC 15721, BCRC 13307, BCRC 15111, CBS 167.62, CBS 657.72, CCRC 13307, CCRC 15111, CGMCC 4.1484, DSM 40269, DSM 43032, IFM 1141, IFO 12246, IFO 13356, IFO 13904, IMRU 3750, ISP 5269, JCM 3039, JCM 4828, JCM 4828 L, KCC A-0039, KCC S-0828, KCTC 9065, NBRC 12246, NBRC 13356, NBRC 13904, NRRL B-2317, NRRL-ISP 5269, RIA 1317, VKM Ac-1909, Waksman 3750

Synonyms
- Chainia antibiotica

Species of bacterium

Streptomyces sclerotialus is a thermophillic bacterium species from the genus of Streptomyces which was isolated from soil. Streptomyces sclerotialus has the ability to degrade benzoate.

== See also ==
- List of Streptomyces species
