= Barq's =

Root beer manufactured by The Coca-Cola Company

Barq's Root Beer
- Type: Root beer
- Manufacturer: The Coca-Cola Company
- Origin: United States
- Introduced: 1898; 128 years ago
- Variants: Diet Root Beer; Red Crème Soda; Cherry Bite (Spicy Cherry cola); Diet Red Crème Soda; French Vanilla Crème Soda; Birch Beer; Diet French Vanilla Crème Soda; Floatz (Discontinued); Peach (Discontinued)
- Related products: A&W Root Beer, Mug Root Beer, Dad's Root Beer, Sarsi
- Website: www.barqs.com

Barq's (/ˈbɑːrks/) is a brand of root beer created by Edward Barq and bottled since the beginning of the 20th century. It is owned by the Coca-Cola Company. It was known as "Barq's Famous Olde Tyme Root Beer" until 2012. Some of its formulations contain caffeine.

== History ==
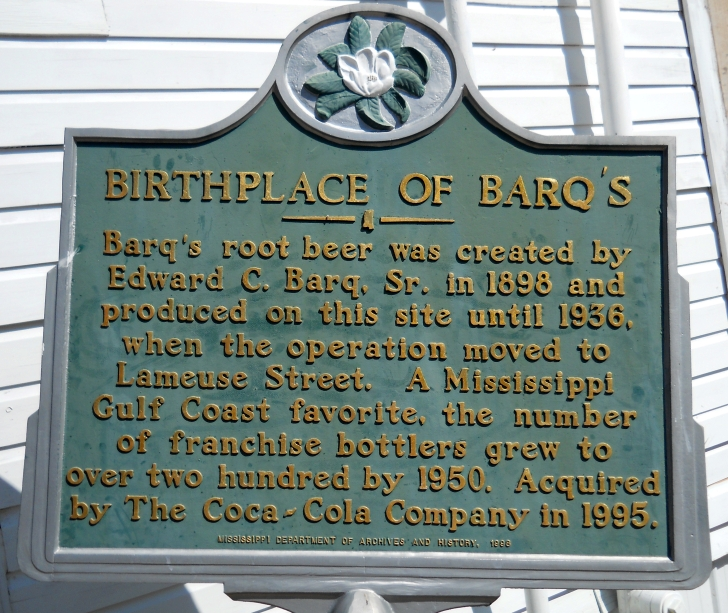
Historical Marker at Edward Barq's Pop Factory, Biloxi, Mississippi, USA

The Barq's Brothers Bottling Company was founded in 1890 in the French Quarter of New Orleans, by Edward Charles Edmond Barq and his older brother, Gaston. The brothers bottled carbonated water and various soft drinks of their own creation. Early on, their most popular creation was an orange-flavored soda called Orangine.

Edward Barq moved to Biloxi, Mississippi in 1897 with his new wife. The following year he opened the Biloxi Artesian Bottling Works. By some accounts he debuted what was later to be known as "Barq's root beer" the following year, but others maintain it was not produced until 1900.

For many decades, Barq's was not marketed as a "root beer". This was in part a desire to avoid legal conflict with the Hires Root Beer company, which was attempting to claim a trademark on the term "root beer". It was also due to some differences from other root beers at the time. The formulation was sarsaparilla-based, contained less sugar, had a higher carbonation, and less of a foamy head than other brands.

The traditional slogan was the simple affirmation which first appeared on the classic diamond-necked bottle patented in 1935 by Ed Barq: "Drink Barq's. It's good."

In 1976, the Biloxi Barq's Company was purchased from the third generation of Barq family members by John Oudt and John Koerner. An aggressive television campaign was developed based on the "Barq's Got Sparks" theme. Their plans to market the brand nationally were complicated by the existence of the Louisiana-based Barq's companies which were owned and operated by Robinson's heirs.

There were extended legal conflicts over the rights and ownership of the trademarks for Barq's, Barq's Sr. and Barq's Root Beer. The legal battle went all the way to the United States Court of Appeals, 5th Circuit, which ruled in favor of the Robinson heirs. The last family-held Louisiana Barq's was sold by Robinson's heirs to Coca-Cola in 2000.

The world's largest root beer float was created in 1990, when Barq's Root Beer cooperated with a Pick N Save grocery store in Dekalb, Illinois by mixing 1,500 U.S. gallons (5,700 L) of Barq’s root beer with 1,000 U.S. gallons (3,800 L) of vanilla ice cream in an above-ground swimming pool.

In the early 1990s, Barq's sought to use current events in their marketing. In 1991, they attached coupons to 3-D glasses distributed at screenings of Freddy's Dead: The Final Nightmare. In 1992, Barq's utilized the fall of the Soviet Union in a marketing campaign. The company spent between approximately $2.5 to $3 million promoting a "Soviet Union Going Out of Business Sale," where customers could exchange proof of purchase items for memorabilia. In 1994, they utilized publicity surrounding the murder trial of O. J. Simpson to run a sweepstakes where customers could "match the DNA" from a scratchcard to win a trip to Ixtapa and "Get Out of the Country." Since 1995, Barq's has marketed with the slogan "Barq's has bite!" Television ads would typically feature a Barq's salesman (played by Nick Swardson) going door-to-door to tell people, "Barq's has bite" at which point the subjects would take a sip and have an energetic reaction.

Regular Barq's has 22.5 mg of caffeine per 12 ounce serving (similar to green tea), while Diet Barq's has no caffeine. Barq's also contains sodium benzoate as a flavor protectant, which under the right conditions, is a precursor to the known carcinogen benzene. It was still used as of 2008.

The Barq's that is dispensed from Coca-Cola Freestyle machines is caffeine-free. This is because the system uses the same concentrated, microdosed ingredient for both Barq's and Diet Barq's; the only difference between the two is the sweetener that is added. It is also common for Barq's that is sold in the state of Utah to be caffeine-free because many members of The Church of Jesus Christ of Latter-day Saints avoid caffeinated beverages.

== Products ==
Barq's
Nutritional value per 12 fl oz (355 ml)
- Energy: 160 kcal (670 kJ)
- Carbohydrates: 45
- Sugars: 45
- Dietary fiber: 0
- Fat: 0
- Saturated: 0
- Trans: 0
- Protein: 0
Vitamins and minerals
Vitamins	Quantity %DV^{†}
Vitamin A equiv.	0% 0 μg
Vitamin C	0% 0 mg
Minerals	Quantity %DV^{†}
Calcium	0% 0 mg
Iron	0% 0 mg
Potassium	0% 0 mg
Sodium	3% 70 mg
- Other constituents: Quantity
- Cholesterol: 0
- ^{†}Percentages estimated using US recommendations for adults, except for potassium, which is estimated based on expert recommendation from the National Academies.

- Barq's Root Beer
- Diet Barq's Root Beer - contains no caffeine. Available in Root Beer and Vanilla Cream.
- Barq's Zero Sugar Root Beer (Diet Barq's Root Beer rebranded in 2022)
- Barq's Red Crème Soda (Barq's Yellow Creme Soda was also produced until the early 1990s).
- Diet Barq's Red Crème Soda
- Barq's French Vanilla Crème Soda
- Barq's Spiced Cherry (Canada)
- Barq's Birch Beer
- Discontinued: Diet Crème Soda Barq's French Vanilla
- Discontinued: Barq's Floatz, which is designed to taste like a root beer float. J & J Snack Foods Corporation once licensed the brand name for Barq's Floatz ice cream squeeze tubes.
