= Calcium benzoate =

Chemical compound

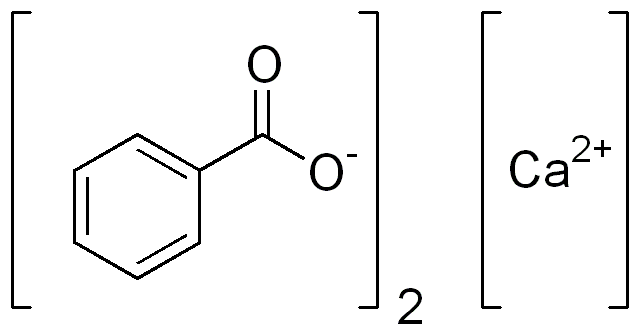

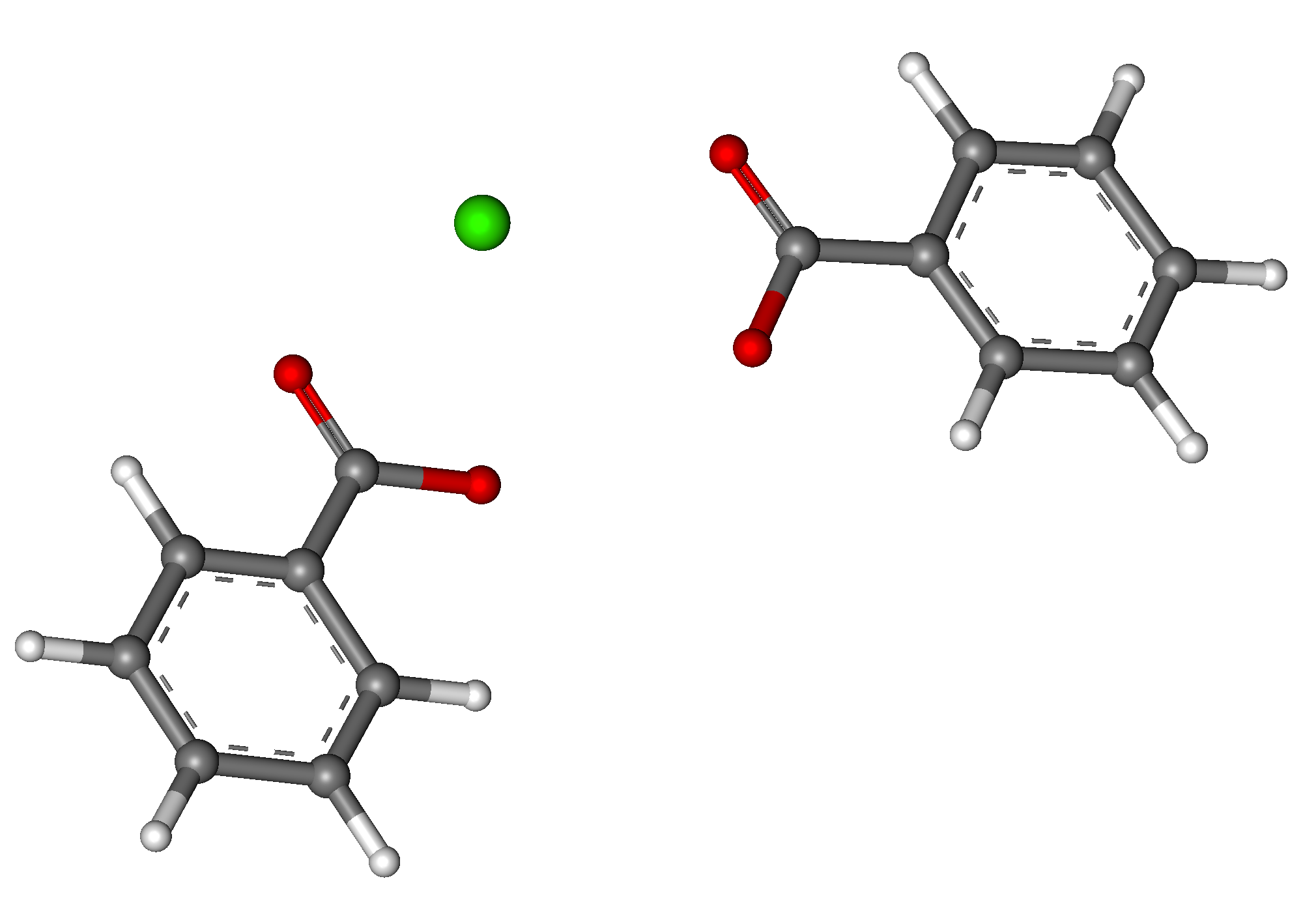

Names
- Preferred IUPAC name Calcium dibenzoate
- Other names: E213; Benzoic acid, calcium salt

Identifiers
CAS Number	2090-05-3
3D model (JSmol)	Interactive image
ChemSpider	56210
ECHA InfoCard	100.016.578
EC Number	218-235-4
E number	E213 (preservatives)
PubChem CID	62425
UNII	3QDE968MKD
CompTox Dashboard (EPA)	DTXSID4044612
- InChI: InChI=1S/2C7H6O2.Ca/c2*8-7(9)6-4-2-1-3-5-6;/h2*1-5H,(H,8,9);/q;;+2/p-2 Key: NSQPPSOSXWOZNH-UHFFFAOYSA-L; InChI=1/2C7H6O2.Ca/c2*8-7(9)6-4-2-1-3-5-6;/h2*1-5H,(H,8,9);/q;;+2/p-2 Key: NSQPPSOSXWOZNH-NUQVWONBAQ
- SMILES: [Ca+2].[O-]C(=O)c1ccccc1.[O-]C(=O)c1ccccc1

Properties
Chemical formula	Ca(C_{7}H_{5}O_{2})_{2}
Molar mass	282.31 g/mol
Solubility in water	2.32 g/100 mL (0 °C); 2.72 g/100 mL (20 °C); 8.7 g/100 mL (100 °C)
- Except where otherwise noted, data are given for materials in their standard state (at 25 °C [77 °F], 100 kPa). verify (what is ?) Infobox references

Calcium benzoate refers to the calcium salt of benzoic acid. When used in the food industry as a preservative, its E number is E213 (INS number 213); it is approved for use as a food additive in the EU, USA and Australia and New Zealand.

The formulas and structures of calcium carboxylate derivatives of calcium and related metals are complex. Generally the coordination number is eight and the carboxylates form Ca-O bonds. Another variable is the degree of hydration.

== Uses ==
It is preferentially used more than other benzoic acid salts or its esters in foods due to its better solubility and safety to humans.

It is used in soft drinks, fruit juice, concentrates, soy milk, soy sauce and vinegar.

It is the most widely used preservative in making bread and other bakery products.

It is used as preservative for water based insecticidal composition which can be sprayed as well as in preparation of calcium formate direct sprayable fertilizers.

It is used as preservative for mouth wash compositions.

It is used in water hardness reducers.

== See also ==
- Sodium benzoate
- Potassium benzoate
