= C14H10O3 =

The molecular formula C_{14}H_{10}O_{3} (molar mass: 226.23 g/mol, exact mass: 226.0630 u) may refer to:

- Benzoic anhydride
- Dithranol, or anthralin
