= C7H5FO =

The molecular formula C_{7}H_{5}FO may refer to:

- Benzoyl fluoride
- Fluorobenzaldehyde
