= Victor Dessaignes =

French chemist (1800–1885)

- Born: December 31, 1800; Vendôme, France
- Died: January 4, 1885 (aged 84)
- Education: College de Vendée, studied law, graduated in medicine in 1835
- Occupations: Lawyer, physician, chemist
- Known for: Organic chemistry, synthesis of hippuric acid, malonic acid, asparagine, and optical isomers of tartaric acid
- Spouse: Victorine-Sophie Renou
- Children: Son (professor of medicine)
- Awards: Jecker Prize (1860), Chevalier of the Legion of Honor (1863)

Signature
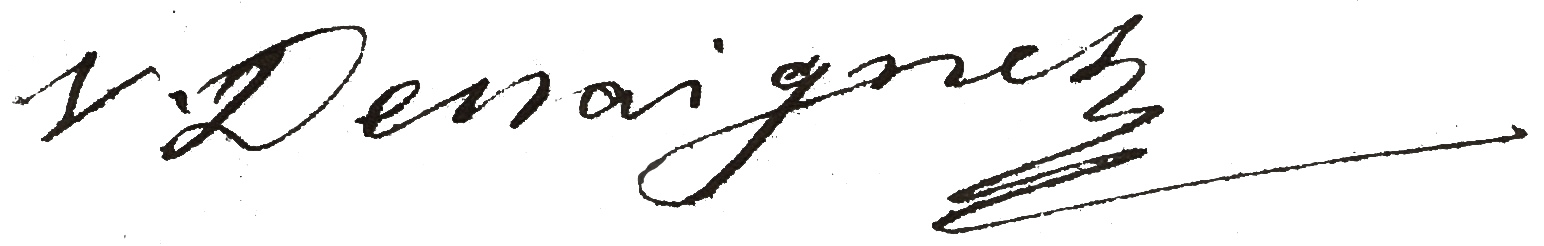

Victor Dessaignes (31 December 1800 – 4 January 1885) was a French lawyer, medical doctor and chemist. Dessaignes conducted experiments on organic acids and was involved in the synthesis of hippuric acid. He was also involved in characterizing and naming malonic acid, the synthesis of asparagine from ammonium dimalate, conversion between optical isomers of tartaric acid, fumaric acid in mushrooms and the synthesis of several amides.

== Life and work ==
Dessaignes was born in Vendôme, the third son of Jean-Philibert Dessaignes (1762–1832) and Emilie-Françoise Renou. He studied at the college de Vendee that his father had helped develop in Vendôme and went on to study law, admitted to the bar in 1821. He however did not practice and began studies in medicine, graduating in 1835. Unable to handle the sight of blood, he did not practice medicine and moved to chemistry. Dessaignes conducted experiments on organic compounds. Hippuric acid had been produced by Justus von Liebig from horse urine in 1829 and it had then been found that human urine had more hippuric acid upon ingesting benzoic acid. Dessaignes was able to react benzoylchloride with zinc salt of glycine to produce hippuric acid in 1873. In 1858 he extracted malic acid from the rhubarb plant and oxidized it to produce malonic acid. Dessaigne's 1835 doctoral thesis dissertation was titled "Les Corps Analogues par leurs Propriétés Chimiques se Ressemblent-ils par les Modifications qu'ils Impriment aux Organes des Animaux Vivants?" Between 1836 and 1838 he taught anatomy and physiology at Vendôme at a school run by Père Duchesne.

Dessaignes married a cousin Victorine-Sophie Renou, sister of Émilien Renou, who had a fall on ice and died shortly after the birth of their son who became a professor of medicine. Dessaignes received the 1860 Jecker prize and was made chevalier of the Legion of Honor in 1863. He died from a respiratory tract infection.
