= Aminobenzoic acid =

Aminobenzoic acid (a benzoic acid with an amino group) can refer to:

- 4-Aminobenzoic acid (p-aminobenzoic acid or para-aminobenzoic acid);
- 3-Aminobenzoic acid (m-aminobenzoic acid or meta-aminobenzoic acid);
- 2-aminobenzoic acid (o-aminobenzoic acid or ortho-aminobenzoic acid, Anthranilic acid).
