= Methylhippuric acid =

- Chemical structures of 2-, 3-, and 4-methylhippuric acid

Names
- Other names Toluric acid; N-(Toluoyl)glycine

Identifiers
CAS Number	2-: 42013-20-7; 3-: 27115-49-7; 4-: 27115-50-0
3D model (JSmol)	2-: Interactive image; 3-: Interactive image; 4-: Interactive image
ChEBI	2-: CHEBI:68455; 3-: CHEBI:68500; 4-: CHEBI:68552
ChEMBL	2-: ChEMBL457228; 3-: ChEMBL456202; 4-: ChEMBL274877
ChemSpider	2-: 82742; 3-: 89642; 4-: 87986
EC Number	2-: 255-622-7; 4-: 248-231-8
PubChem CID	2-: 91637; 3-: 99223; 4-: 97479
UNII	2-: J043BCI40Z; 3-: W60W59C1G5; 4-: 9QOX0DSK6F
- InChI: 2-: InChI=1S/C10H11NO3/c1-7-4-2-3-5-8(7)10(14)11-6-9(12)13/h2-5H,6H2,1H3,(H,11,14)(H,12,13) Key: YOEBAVRJHRCKRE-UHFFFAOYSA-N; 3-: InChI=1S/C10H11NO3/c1-7-3-2-4-8(5-7)10(14)11-6-9(12)13/h2-5H,6H2,1H3,(H,11,14)(H,12,13) Key: YKAKNMHEIJUKEX-UHFFFAOYSA-N; 4-: InChI=1S/C10H11NO3/c1-7-2-4-8(5-3-7)10(14)11-6-9(12)13/h2-5H,6H2,1H3,(H,11,14)(H,12,13) Key: NRSCPTLHWVWLLH-UHFFFAOYSA-N
- SMILES: 2-: CC1=CC=CC=C1C(=O)NCC(=O)O; 3-: CC1=CC=CC(=C1)C(=O)NCC(=O)O; 4-: CC1=CC=C(C=C1)C(=O)NCC(=O)O

Properties
Chemical formula	C_{10}H_{11}NO_{3}
Molar mass	193.202 g·mol^{−1}
- Except where otherwise noted, data are given for materials in their standard state (at 25 °C [77 °F], 100 kPa). Infobox references

Methylhippuric acid is a carboxylic acid and organic compound. Methylhippuric acid has three isomers. The isomers include 2-, 3-, and 4-methylhippuric acid.

Methylhippuric acids are metabolites of the isomers of xylene. The presence of methylhippuric acid can be used as a biomarker to determine exposure to xylene.

== See also ==
- Hippuric acid
