= Hippuric acid =

Organic compound

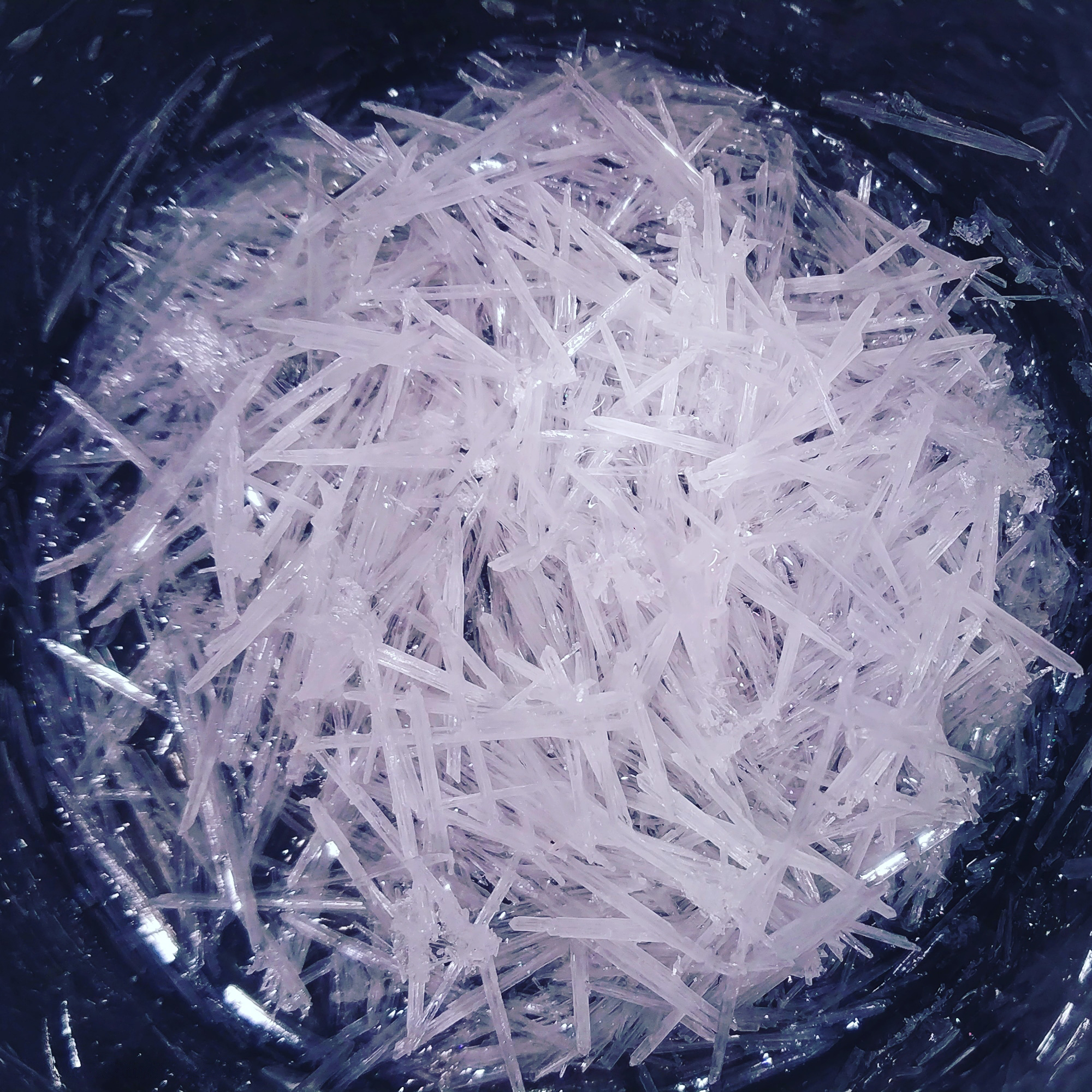

Names
- IUPAC name N-Benzoylglycine
- Preferred IUPAC name Benzamidoacetic acid
- Other names: Hippuric acid; Benzoyl glycocoll; Benzoyl amidoacetic acid

Identifiers
CAS Number	495-69-2
3D model (JSmol)	Interactive image
ChEBI	CHEBI:18089
ChEMBL	ChEMBL461
ChemSpider	451
ECHA InfoCard	100.007.098
KEGG	C01586
PubChem CID	464
UNII	TE0865N2ET
CompTox Dashboard (EPA)	DTXSID9046073
- InChI: InChI=1S/C9H9NO3/c11-8(12)6-10-9(13)7-4-2-1-3-5-7/h1-5H,6H2,(H,10,13)(H,11,12) Key: QIAFMBKCNZACKA-UHFFFAOYSA-N; InChI=1/C9H9NO3/c11-8(12)6-10-9(13)7-4-2-1-3-5-7/h1-5H,6H2,(H,10,13)(H,11,12) Key: QIAFMBKCNZACKA-UHFFFAOYAD
- SMILES: OC(=O)CNC(=O)c1ccccc1

Properties
Chemical formula	C_{9}H_{9}NO_{3}
Molar mass	179.175 g·mol^{−1}
Density	1.371 g/cm^{3}
Melting point	187 to 188 °C (369 to 370 °F; 460 to 461 K)
Boiling point	240 °C (464 °F; 513 K) (decomposes)

Hazards
Safety data sheet (SDS)	Material Safety Data Sheet
- Except where otherwise noted, data are given for materials in their standard state (at 25 °C [77 °F], 100 kPa). verify (what is ?) Infobox references

Hippuric acid (Gr. hippos, horse, ouron, urine) is a carboxylic acid and organic compound. It is found in urine and is formed from the combination of benzoic acid and glycine. The phenols are first converted to benzoic acid, and then to hippuric acid and excreted in urine.

Hippuric acid crystallizes in rhombic prisms which are readily soluble in hot water, melt at 187 °C, and decompose at about 240 °C. High concentrations of hippuric acid may also indicate a toluene intoxication; however, scientists have called this correlation into question, because there are other variables that affect levels of hippuric acid. When many aromatic compounds such as benzoic acid and toluene are taken internally, they are converted to hippuric acid by reaction with the amino acid glycine.

== Synthesis ==
A modern synthesis of hippuric acid involves the acylation of glycine with benzoyl chloride ("Schotten–Baumann reaction").

== Physiology and potential toxicity ==
Biochemically, hippuric acid is produced from benzoic acid and glycine, which occurs in the liver, intestine, and kidneys. In terms of mechanism, benzoic acid is converted to benzoyl CoA, an acylating agent.

Hippuric acid may be formed from the essential amino acid phenylalanine through at least two pathways. Phenylalanine undergoes biotransformation to form an alpha-keto acid, phenylpyruvic acid, which can tautomerize to a reactive enol. The benzylic carbon is reactive which undergoes peroxidation followed by the competing pathways to either react with the alpha carbon subsequently form an dioxetanol intermediate followed by formation of oxalic acid and benzaldehyde, or, peroxidation can react with the carboxyl group to form an alpha-keto-beta-peroxylactone intermediate followed by formation of carbon monoxide, carbon dioxide, and benzaldehyde. Alternatively, under certain conditions, phenylpyruvic acid may undergo a redox mechanism, such as Iron(II) donating an electron, to directly release carbon dioxide, followed by carbon monoxide, for the formation of a stable toluene radical which is resolved by an antioxidant such as ascorbate.

In all of the aforementioned cases, benzaldehyde undergoes biotransformation via CYP450 to benzoic acid followed by conjugation to glycine for formation of hippurate which undergoes urinary excretion. Similarly, toluene reacts with CYP450 to form benzaldehyde.

Hippuric acid is a uremic toxin which can produce kidney and cardiovascular diseases if exposure is chronic in high amounts. It can be formed from digestion of foods containing polyphenols and from aspirin. Hippuric acid is a common biomarker used for monitoring occupational exposure to toluene.

== Reactions ==
Hippuric acid is readily hydrolysed by hot caustic alkalis to benzoic acid and glycine. Nitrous acid converts it into benzoyl glycolic acid, C_{6}H_{5}C(=O)OCH_{2}CO_{2}H. Its ethyl ester reacts with hydrazine to form hippuryl hydrazine, C_{6}H_{5}CONHCH_{2}CONHNH_{2}, which was used by Theodor Curtius for the preparation of hydrazoic acid.

Hippuric acid has also been used in Erlenmeyer–Plöchl synthesis of phenylalanine and other amino acids, the reaction proceeding via an oxazolone or "azlactone" intermediate.

== History ==
Justus von Liebig showed in 1829 that hippuric acid differed from benzoic acid and he named it, and in 1834 he determined its constitution, while in 1853 French chemist Victor Dessaignes (1800–1885) synthesized it by the action of benzoyl chloride on the zinc salt of glycine. It was also formed by heating benzoic anhydride with glycine, and by heating benzamide with monochloroacetic acid.

== See also ==
- para-Aminohippuric acid
- ortho-Iodohippuric acid
- Methylhippuric acid (three different isomers)
