= Methyl benzoate =

Methyl benzoate
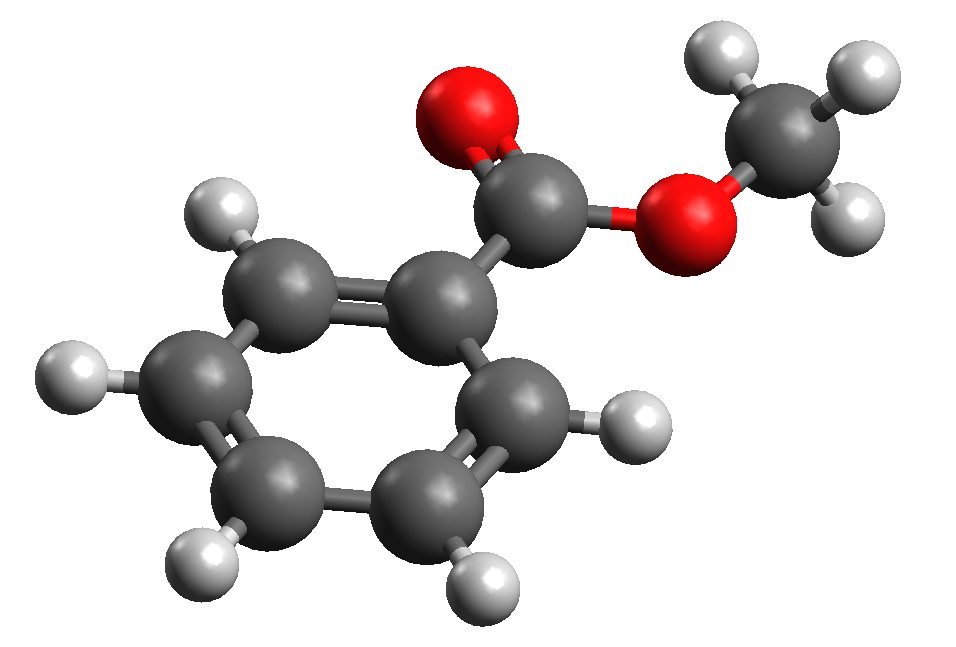
3D model of methyl benzoate
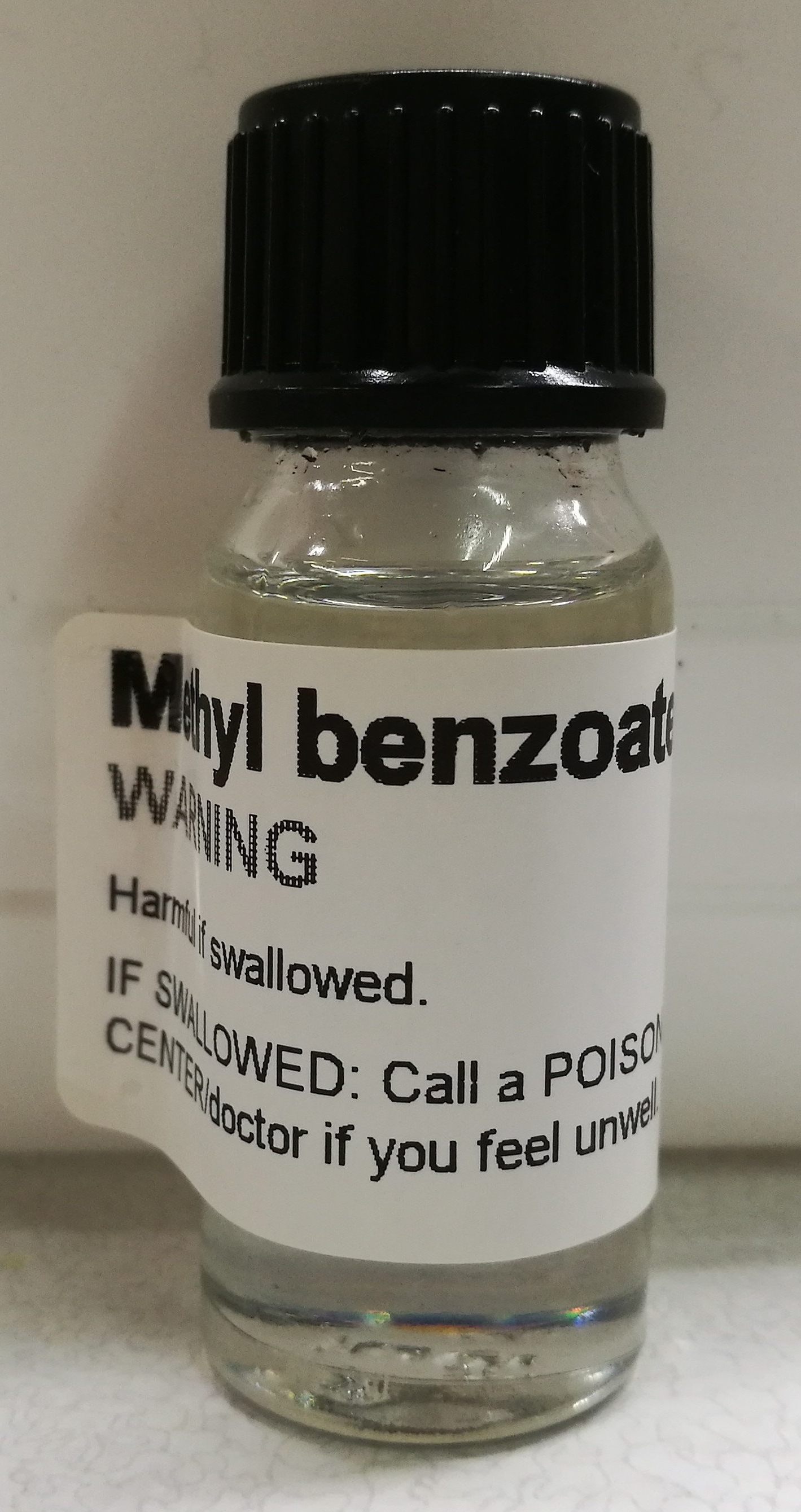

Names
- Preferred IUPAC name Methyl benzoate
- Systematic IUPAC name Methyl benzenecarboxylate

Identifiers
CAS Number	93-58-3
3D model (JSmol)	Interactive image
ChEMBL	ChEMBL16435
ChemSpider	6883
ECHA InfoCard	100.002.055
PubChem CID	7150
UNII	6618K1VJ9T
CompTox Dashboard (EPA)	DTXSID5025572
- InChI: InChI=1S/C8H8O2/c1-10-8(9)7-5-3-2-4-6-7/h2-6H,1H3 Key: QPJVMBTYPHYUOC-UHFFFAOYSA-N; InChI=1/C8H8O2/c1-10-8(9)7-5-3-2-4-6-7/h2-6H,1H3 Key: QPJVMBTYPHYUOC-UHFFFAOYAK
- SMILES: O=C(OC)c1ccccc1

Properties
Chemical formula	C_{6}H_{5}COOCH_{3}
Molar mass	136.150 g·mol^{−1}
Appearance	Colourless liquid
Density	1.0837 g/cm^{3}
Melting point	−12.35 °C (9.77 °F; 260.80 K)
Boiling point	199 °C (390 °F; 472 K)
log P	2.1
Vapor pressure	0.51 hPa (0.0074 psi)
Magnetic susceptibility (χ)	−81.95×10^{−6} cm^{3}/mol
Refractive index (n_{D})	1.5164
Viscosity	1.94 mPa·s (23 °C (73 °F; 296 K))

Hazards
- GHS labelling
Pictograms	(GHS08: Health hazard) (GHS07: Exclamation mark)
Signal word	Warning
Hazard statements	H227, H302, H361, H402
Precautionary statements	P201, P202, P210, P264, P270, P273, P280, P301+P312+P330, P308+P313, P370+P378, P403+P235, P405, P501
NFPA 704 (fire diamond)	1 2 0
Flash point	77 °C (171 °F; 350 K)
Autoignition temperature	518 °C (964 °F; 791 K)
Explosive limits	8.6%–20%
- Lethal dose or concentration (LD, LC)
LD_{50} (median dose)	1625 mg/kg (rat, male)

Related compounds
Related compounds	Ethyl benzoate; Propyl benzoate
- Except where otherwise noted, data are given for materials in their standard state (at 25 °C [77 °F], 100 kPa). verify (what is ?) Infobox references

Methyl benzoate is an organic compound with the chemical formula C_{6}H_{5}COOCH_{3}, sometimes abbreviated as PhCO_{2}Me, where Ph and Me are phenyl and methyl, respectively. It is the methyl ester of benzoic acid. It is a colorless liquid that is poorly soluble in water but miscible with organic solvents. Methyl benzoate has a pleasant odor.

== Synthesis and reactions ==
Methyl benzoate is formed by the condensation of methanol and benzoic acid.

In nature, methyl benzoate is derived from benzoic acid by the enzymes O-methyltransferases, which use S-adenosylmethionine as a methyl donor. methyl salicylate forms similarly.

Methyl benzoate reacts at both the ring and the ester, depending on the substrate. Electrophiles attack the ring, illustrated by acid-catalysed nitration with nitric acid to give methyl 3-nitrobenzoate. Nucleophiles attack the carbonyl center, illustrated by hydrolysis with addition of aqueous NaOH to give methanol and sodium benzoate.

== Occurrence ==
Methyl benzoate can be isolated from the freshwater fern Salvinia molesta. It is one of many compounds that is attractive to males of various species of orchid bees, which apparently gather the chemical to synthesize pheromones; it is commonly used as bait to attract and collect these bees for study.

Having a fruity aroma, methyl benzoate occurs in ylang-ylang, tuberose, Michelia. It is the principal aroma compound in feijoa fruit.

Cocaine hydrochloride hydrolyzes in moist air to give methyl benzoate; drug-sniffing dogs are thus trained to detect the smell of methyl benzoate.

== Uses ==
Perfumery.
