= Glycine N-acyltransferase =

Enzyme

Identifiers
- EC no.: 2.3.1.13
- CAS no.: 9029-95-2

Databases
- BRENDA: enzyme data
- ExPASy: NiceZyme view
- KEGG: enzyme entry
- MetaCyc: metabolic pathway
- Rhea: reactions
- PDB structures: RCSB PDB PDBe PDBsum
- Gene Ontology: AmiGO / QuickGO
Search
- PMC: articles
- PubMed: articles
- NCBI: proteins

Glycine N-acyltransferase (GLYAT), also known as acyl-CoA:glycine N-acyltransferase (ACGNAT), (EC 2.3.1.13) is an enzyme that catalyzes a general chemical reaction in which glycine is converted to an N-acyl derivative.

glycine + an acyl-CoA $\rightleftharpoons$ N-acylglycine + CoA

For example, glycine reacts with benzoyl-CoA to give hippuric acid:

glycine
+
benzoyl-CoA
hippuric acid
+ coenzyme A

Benzoic acid is metabolized by butyrate-CoA ligase into the intermediate, benzoyl-CoA, which is then metabolized by glycine N-acyltransferase into hippuric acid.

The enzyme is a transferases, specifically those acyltransferases transferring groups other than aminoacyl groups. The systematic name of this enzyme class is acyl-CoA:glycine N-acyltransferase. Other names in common use include glycine acyltransferase, and glycine-N-acylase.
