= Benzoyl chloride =

Organochlorine compound (C7H5ClO)

- Benzoyl Chloride

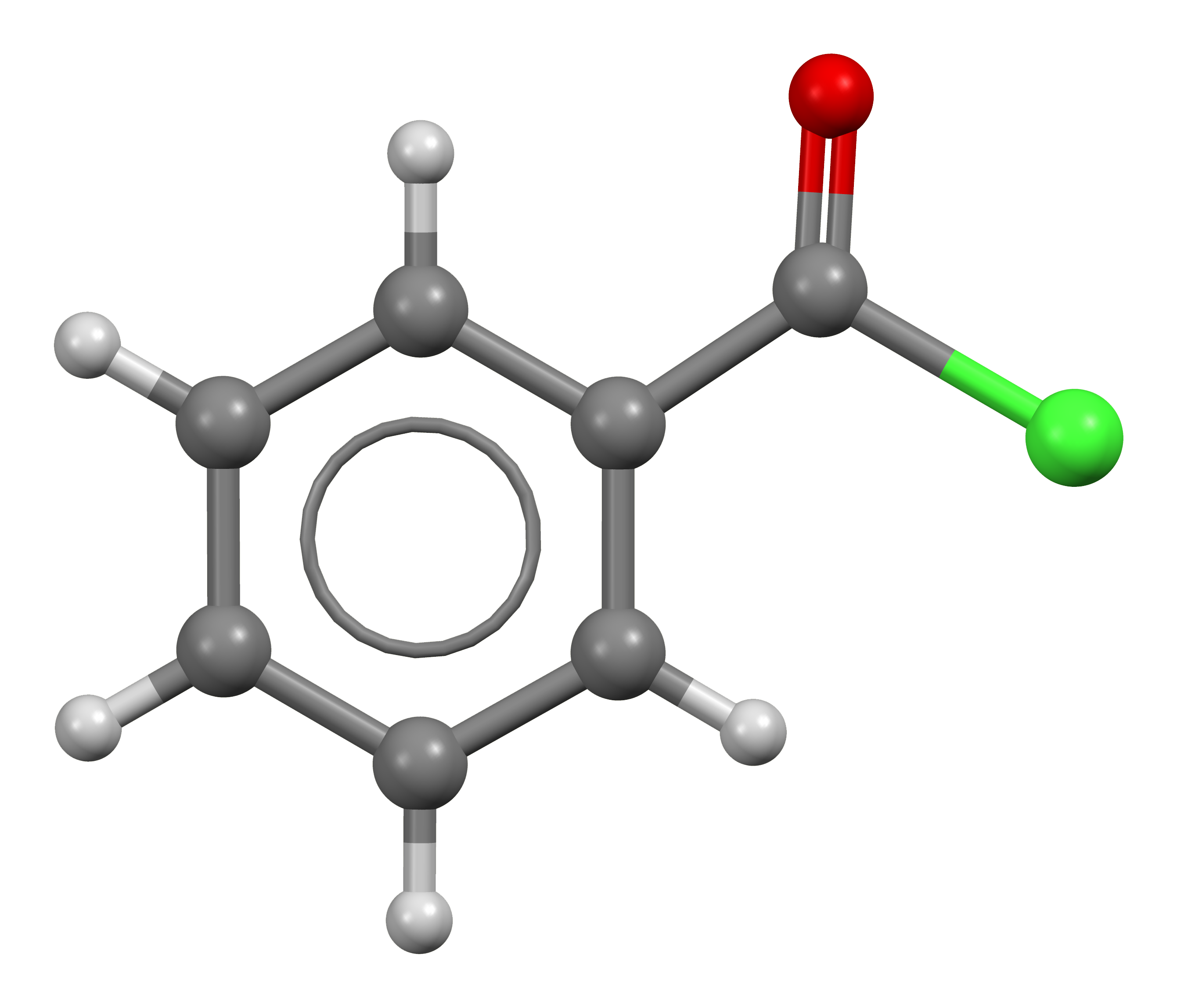

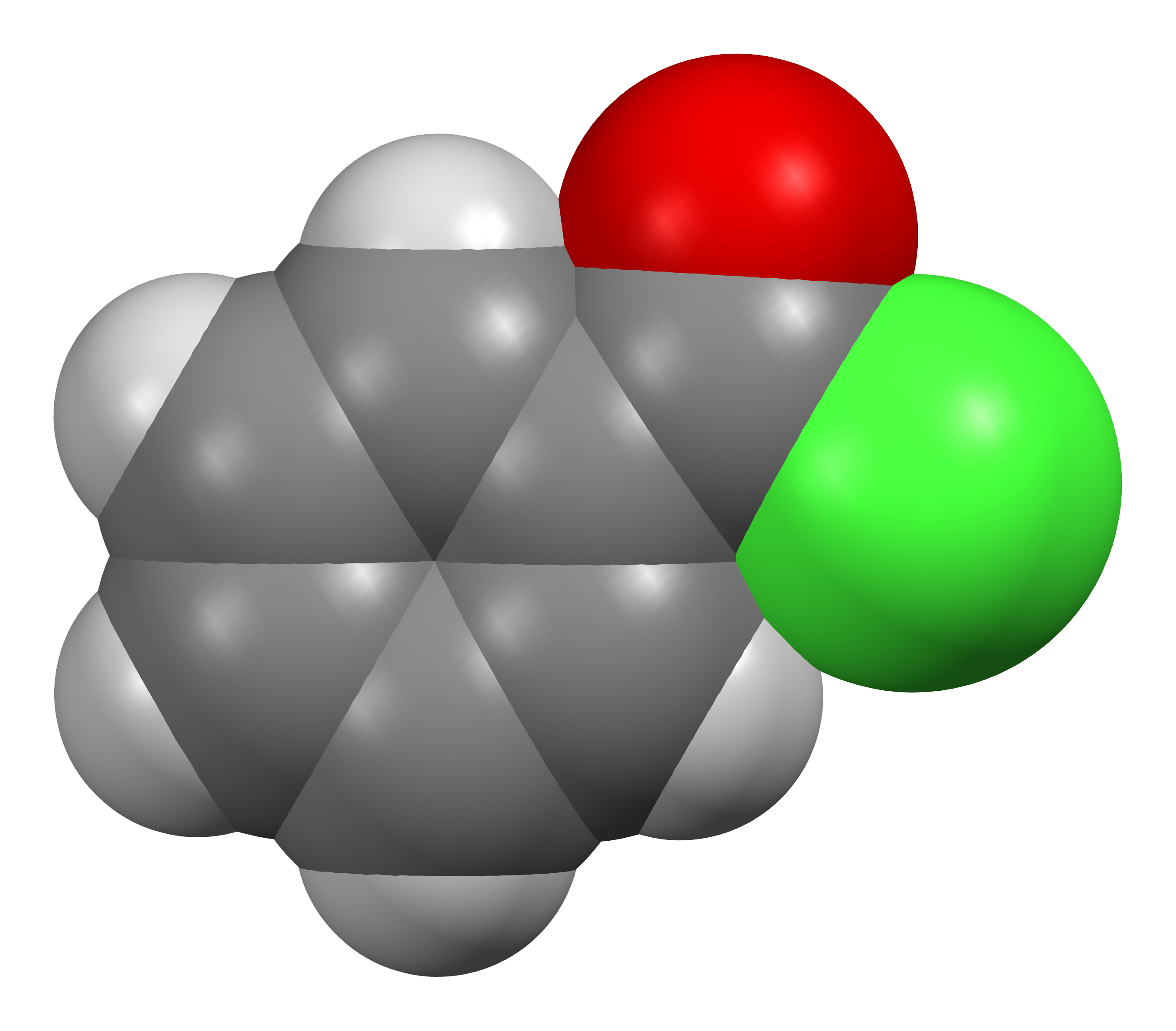

Names
- Preferred IUPAC name Benzoyl chloride
- Other names: Benzoic acid chloride (1:1); alpha-Chlorobenzaldehyde; Benzene carbonyl chloride

Identifiers
CAS Number	98-88-4
3D model (JSmol)	Interactive image; Interactive image
ChEBI	CHEBI:82275
ChEMBL	ChEMBL2260719
ChemSpider	7134
ECHA InfoCard	100.002.464
EC Number	202-710-8
KEGG	C19168
PubChem CID	7412
RTECS number	DM6600000
UNII	VTY8706W36
UN number	1736
CompTox Dashboard (EPA)	DTXSID9026631
- InChI: InChI=1S/C7H5ClO/c8-7(9)6-4-2-1-3-5-6/h1-5H Key: PASDCCFISLVPSO-UHFFFAOYSA-N; InChI=1/C7H5ClO/c8-7(9)6-4-2-1-3-5-6/h1-5H Key: PASDCCFISLVPSO-UHFFFAOYAL
- SMILES: ClC(=O)c1ccccc1; c1ccc(cc1)C(=O)Cl

Properties
Chemical formula	C_{6}H_{5}COCl
Molar mass	140.57 g·mol^{−1}
Appearance	colorless liquid
Odor	Benzaldehyde-like, but more pungent
Density	1.211 g/mL
Melting point	−1 °C (30 °F; 272 K)
Boiling point	198 °C (388 °F; 471 K)
Solubility in water	Reacts. Decomposes to HCl and benzoic acid.
Vapor pressure	1 hPa (0.75 mmHg) (32 °C (90 °F; 305 K))
Magnetic susceptibility (χ)	−75.8×10^{−6} cm^{3}/mol
Viscosity	0.0012 Pa·s

Structure
Point group	C_{s}

Hazards
- GHS labelling
Pictograms	(GHS05: Corrosive) (GHS06: Toxic) (GHS07: Exclamation mark)
Signal word	Danger
Hazard statements	H227, H302+H312, H314, H317, H331, H402
Precautionary statements	P210, P261, P264, P270, P271, P272, P273, P280, P301+P312+P330, P301+P330+P331, P303+P361+P353, P304+P340+P310, P305+P351+P338+P310, P333+P313, P363, P370+P378, P403+P233, P403+P235, P405, P501
NFPA 704 (fire diamond)	3 2 2 W
Flash point	72 °C (162 °F; 345 K)
Autoignition temperature	600 °C (1,112 °F; 873 K)
Explosive limits	2.5% to 27%(V)
Threshold limit value (TLV)	0.5 ppm (C)
- Lethal dose or concentration (LD, LC)
LD_{50} (median dose)	1920 mg/kg (Oral, rat); 1112 mg/kg (Dermal, rabbit)
LC_{50} (median concentration)	3.03 mg/L (Inhalation, rat, 4h)

Related compounds
Related compounds	benzoic acid; benzoic anhydride; benzaldehyde
- Except where otherwise noted, data are given for materials in their standard state (at 25 °C [77 °F], 100 kPa). verify (what is ?) Infobox references

Benzoyl chloride, also known as benzenecarbonyl chloride, is an organochlorine compound with the formula C_{6}H_{5}COCl. It is a colourless, fuming liquid with an irritating odour, and consists of a phenyl ring (C_{6}H_{5}) with an acyl chloride (−C(=O)Cl) substituent. It is mainly useful for the production of organic peroxides but is also used in other areas such as in the preparation of dyes, perfumes, pharmaceuticals, and resins.

== Preparation ==
Benzoyl chloride is produced from benzotrichloride using either water or benzoic acid:

C_{6}H_{5}CCl_{3} + H_{2}O → C_{6}H_{5}COCl + 2 HCl
C_{6}H_{5}CCl_{3} + C_{6}H_{5}CO_{2}H → 2 C_{6}H_{5}COCl + HCl

As with other acyl chlorides, it can be generated from the parent acid and standard chlorinating agents such as phosphorus pentachloride, thionyl chloride, and oxalyl chloride. It was first prepared by treatment of benzaldehyde with chlorine.

An early method for production of benzoyl chloride involved chlorination of benzyl alcohol.

== Reactions ==
It reacts with water to produce hydrochloric acid and benzoic acid:

C_{6}H_{5}COCl + H_{2}O → C_{6}H_{5}COOH + HCl

Benzoyl chloride is a typical acyl chloride. It reacts with alcohols to give the corresponding esters. Similarly, it reacts with amines to give the amide.

It undergoes the Friedel-Crafts acylation with aromatic compounds to give the corresponding benzophenones and related derivatives. With carbanions, it serves again as a source of the benzoyl cation synthon, C_{6}H_{5}CO^{+}.

Benzoyl peroxide, a common reagent in polymer chemistry, is produced industrially by treating benzoyl chloride with hydrogen peroxide and sodium hydroxide:

2 C_{6}H_{5}COCl + H_{2}O_{2} + 2 NaOH → (C_{6}H_{5}CO)_{2}O_{2} + 2 NaCl + 2 H_{2}O

== Modified benzoyl chlorides ==
Many substituted derivatives of benzoyl chloride are known. 4-Nitrobenzoyl chloride is a precursor to the anesthetic procaine. One example is 4-chlorobenzoyl chloride, a precursor to 4-chloro-4'-hydroxybenzophenone, which is used to make high performance polymers.

== Safety ==
Benzoyl chloride is toxic and a serious skin irritant.

== See also ==
- Benzoyl fluoride
