= Potassium benzoate =

Chemical compound

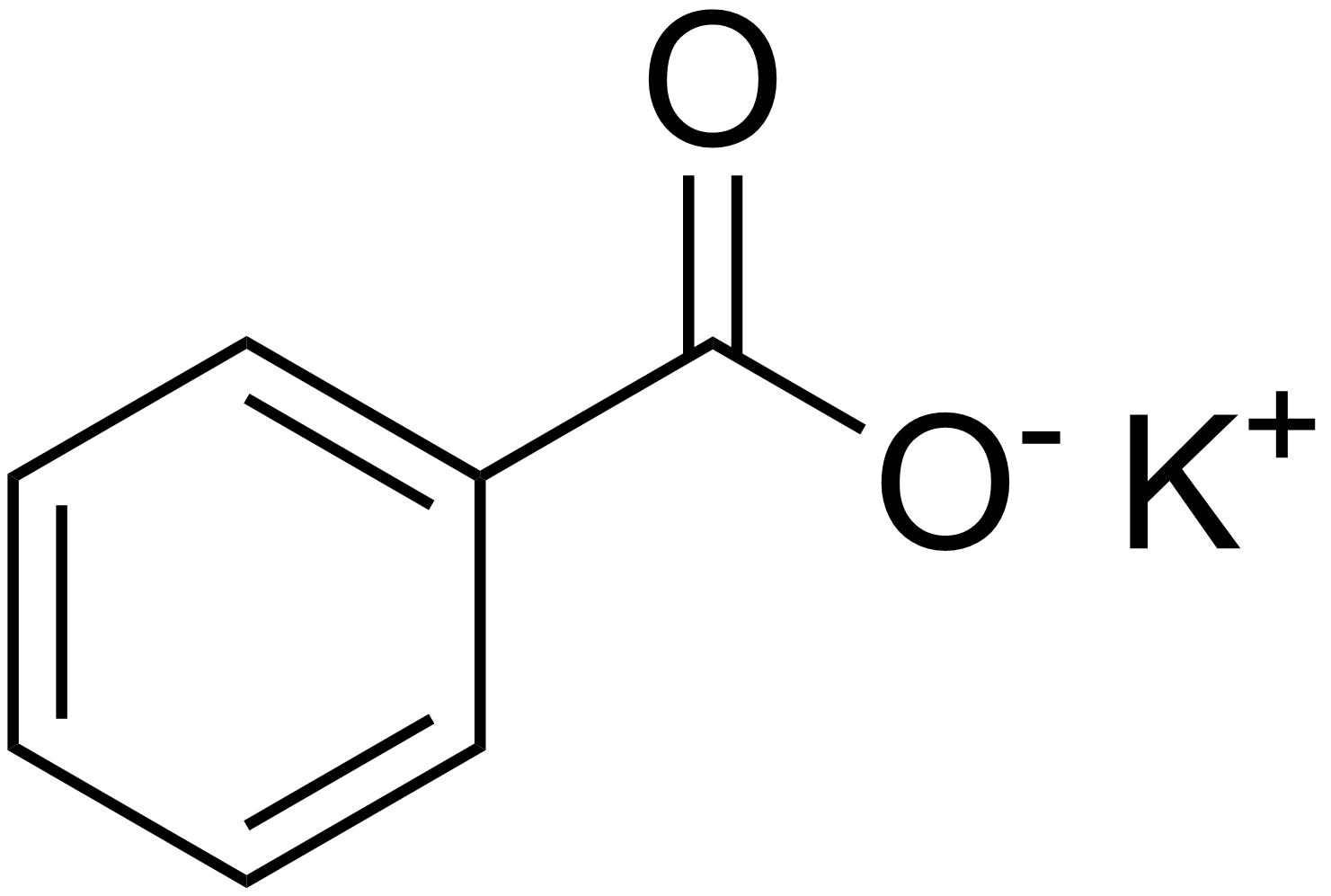

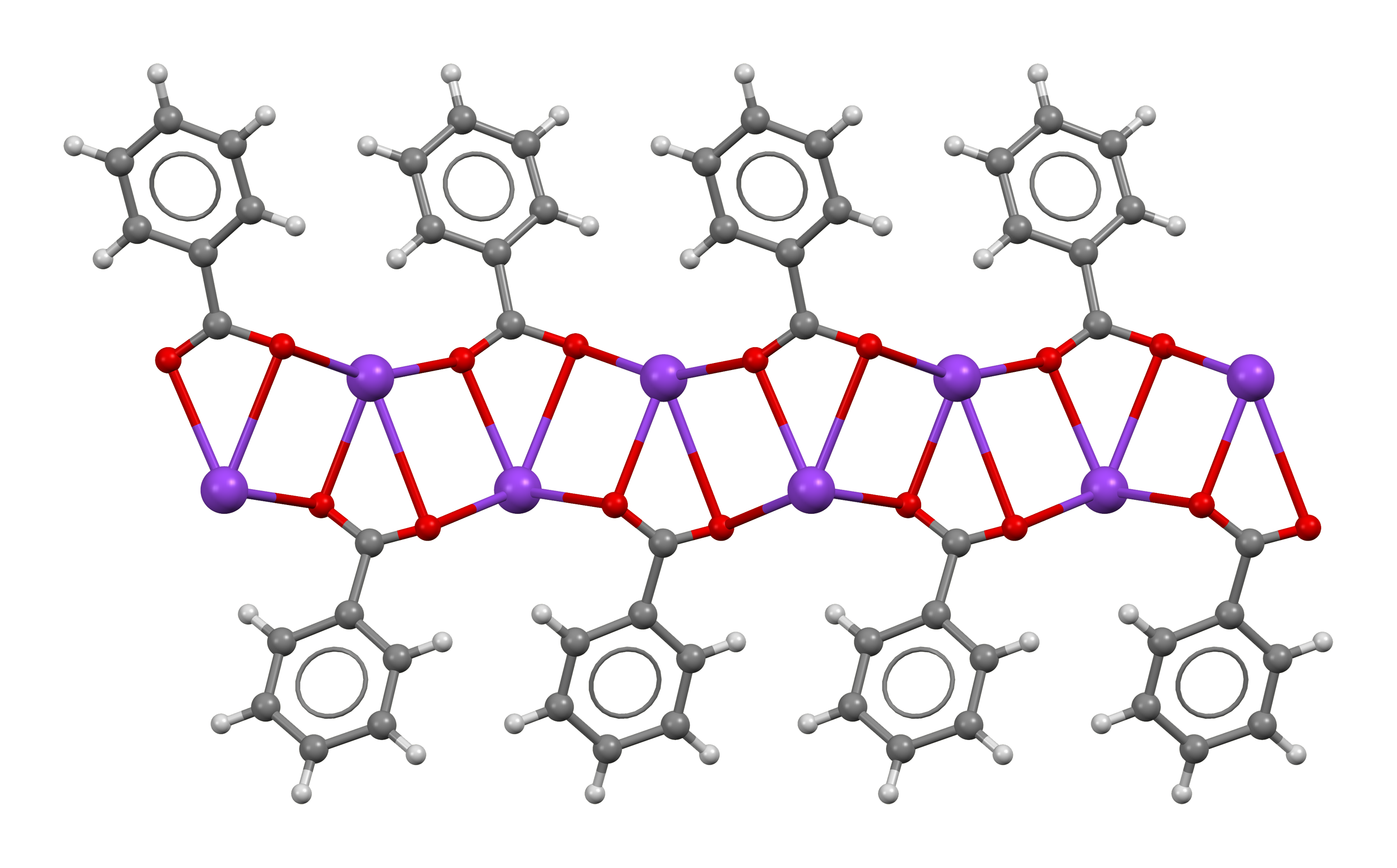

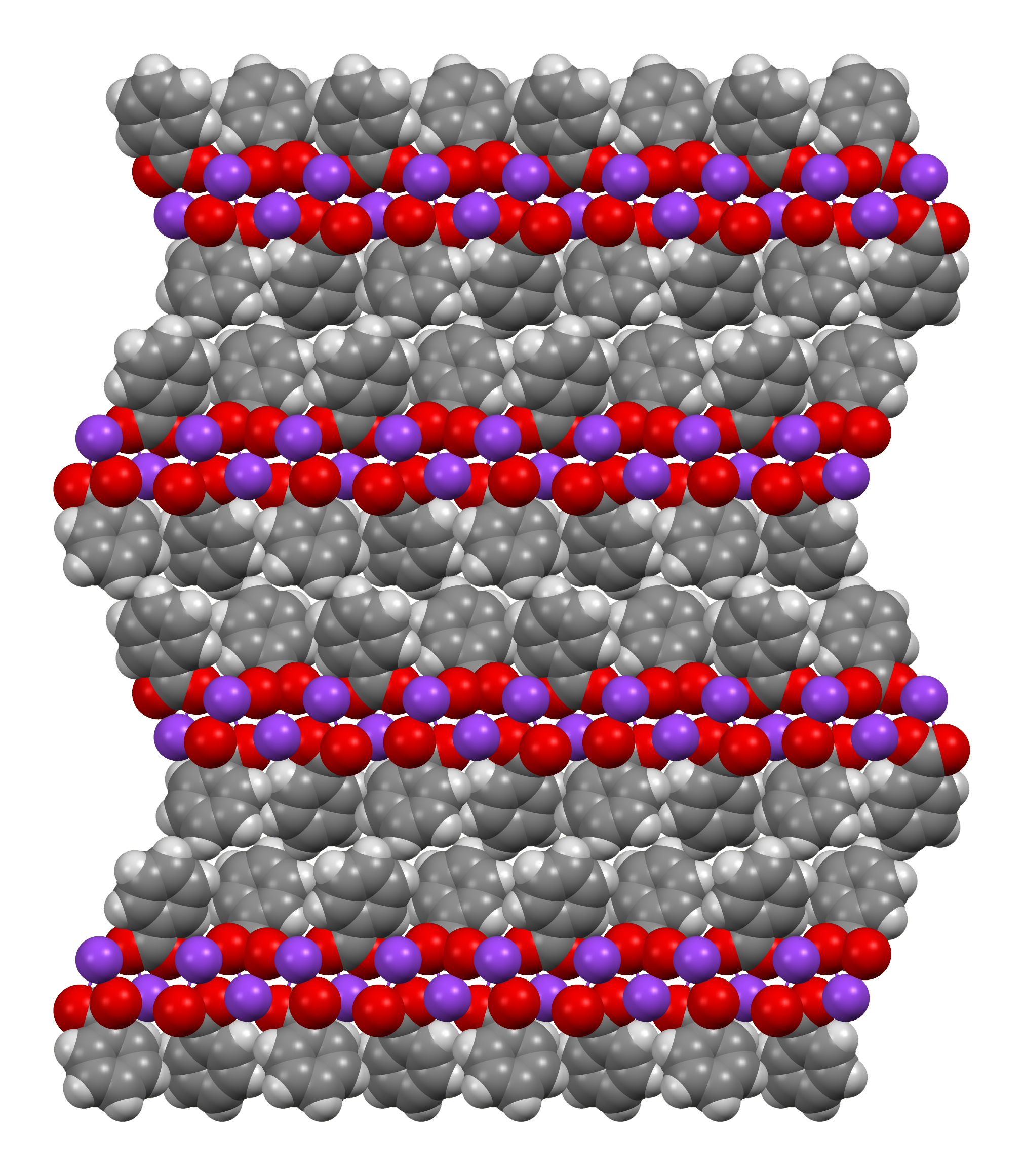

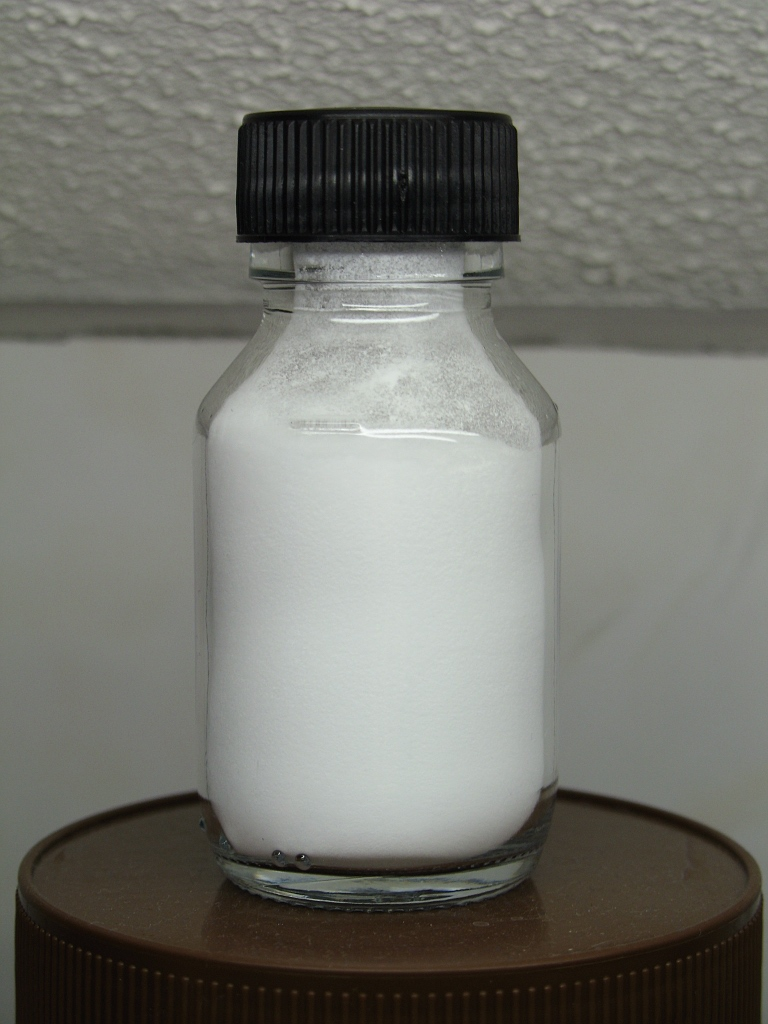

Names
- IUPAC name Potassium benzoate

Identifiers
CAS Number	582-25-2
3D model (JSmol)	Interactive image
ChEMBL	ChEMBL2105241
ChemSpider	10921
ECHA InfoCard	100.008.621
EC Number	209-481-3
E number	E212 (preservatives)
KEGG	D05576
PubChem CID	23661960
UNII	763YQN2K7K
CompTox Dashboard (EPA)	DTXSID1027219
- InChI: InChI=1S/C7H6O2.K/c8-7(9)6-4-2-1-3-5-6;/h1-5H,(H,8,9);/q;+1/p-1 Key: XAEFZNCEHLXOMS-UHFFFAOYSA-M; InChI=1/C7H6O2.K/c8-7(9)6-4-2-1-3-5-6;/h1-5H,(H,8,9);/q;+1/p-1 Key: XAEFZNCEHLXOMS-REWHXWOFAQ
- SMILES: [K+].[O-]C(=O)c1ccccc1

Properties
Chemical formula	C_{6}H_{5}COOK
Molar mass	160.213 g·mol^{−1}
Appearance	White solid
Odor	Odorless
Density	1.56 g/cm^{3} (20 °C (68 °F; 293 K))
Melting point	>300 °C (572 °F; 573 K)
Boiling point	>465 °C (869 °F; 738 K) (decomposes)
Solubility in water	5.04 g/100g (0.86 °C (33.55 °F; 274.01 K), solid); 39.89 g/100g (8.5 °C (47.3 °F; 281.6 K), melting point); 40.6 g/100g (13.0 °C (55.4 °F; 286.1 K)); 44.92 g/100g (41.0 °C (105.8 °F; 314.1 K)); 53.5 g/100g (97.5 °C (207.5 °F; 370.6 K)); 66.09 g/100g (181.0 °C (357.8 °F; 454.1 K))
Solubility in ethanol	soluble
Solubility in methanol	slightly soluble
Solubility in ether	insoluble

Hazards
- GHS labelling
Pictograms	(GHS05: Corrosive)
Signal word	Danger
Hazard statements	H315, H318
Precautionary statements	P264, P280, P302+P352, P305+P351+P338+P310, P332+P313, P362
NFPA 704 (fire diamond)	0 1 1
Threshold limit value (TLV)	2.5 mg/m^{3} (skin) (TWA)

Related compounds
Other anions	Sodium benzoate; Copper benzoate
Other cations	Potassium hydrogen phthalate; Potassium salicylate
- Except where otherwise noted, data are given for materials in their standard state (at 25 °C [77 °F], 100 kPa). verify (what is ?) Infobox references

Potassium benzoate (E212), the potassium salt of benzoic acid with the formula C_{6}H_{5}COOK, is a food preservative that inhibits the growth of mold, yeast and some bacteria. It works best in low-pH products, below 4.5, where it exists as benzoic acid.

Acidic foods and beverages such as fruit juice (citric acid), sparkling drinks (carbonic acid), soft drinks (phosphoric acid), and pickles (vinegar) may be preserved with potassium benzoate. It is approved for use in most countries including Canada, the United States and the European Union, where it is designated by the E number E212.

Potassium benzoate is also used in whistle compositions in pyrotechnics. Compared to the other carboxylic acid salts, sodium salicylate and sodium benzoate often used for this purpose, it has the advantage of not being hygroscopic.

== Synthesis ==
One very common way to make potassium benzoate is by oxidizing toluene to benzoic acid followed by a neutralization with potassium hydroxide:

C_{6}H_{5}COOH + KOH → C_{6}H_{5}COOK + H_{2}O

Another way to synthesize potassium benzoate in the lab setting is by hydrolyzing methyl benzoate with potassium hydroxide:

C_{6}H_{5}COOCH_{3} + KOH → C_{6}H_{5}COOK + CH_{3}OH

== Reactions ==
Potassium benzoate, like sodium benzoate, can be decarboxylated with a strong base and heat, or in the absence of base, through pyrolysis between 435 and 500 °C.

C_{6}H_{5}COOK → C_{6}H_{5}· + CO_{2}
C_{6}H_{5}· + H_{2}O → C_{6}H_{6}

== Mechanism of food preservation ==
The mechanism of food preservation begins with the absorption of benzoic acid into the cell. If the intracellular pH changes to 5 or lower, the anaerobic fermentation of glucose through phosphofructokinase is decreased by 95%.

== Safety and health ==
Potassium benzoate has low acute toxicity upon oral and dermal exposure. It is a mild irritant to the skin, and has the potential to cause serious eye damage.

== See also ==
- Benzoic acid
