= Benzoic anhydride =

Chemical compound (C6H5CO)2O

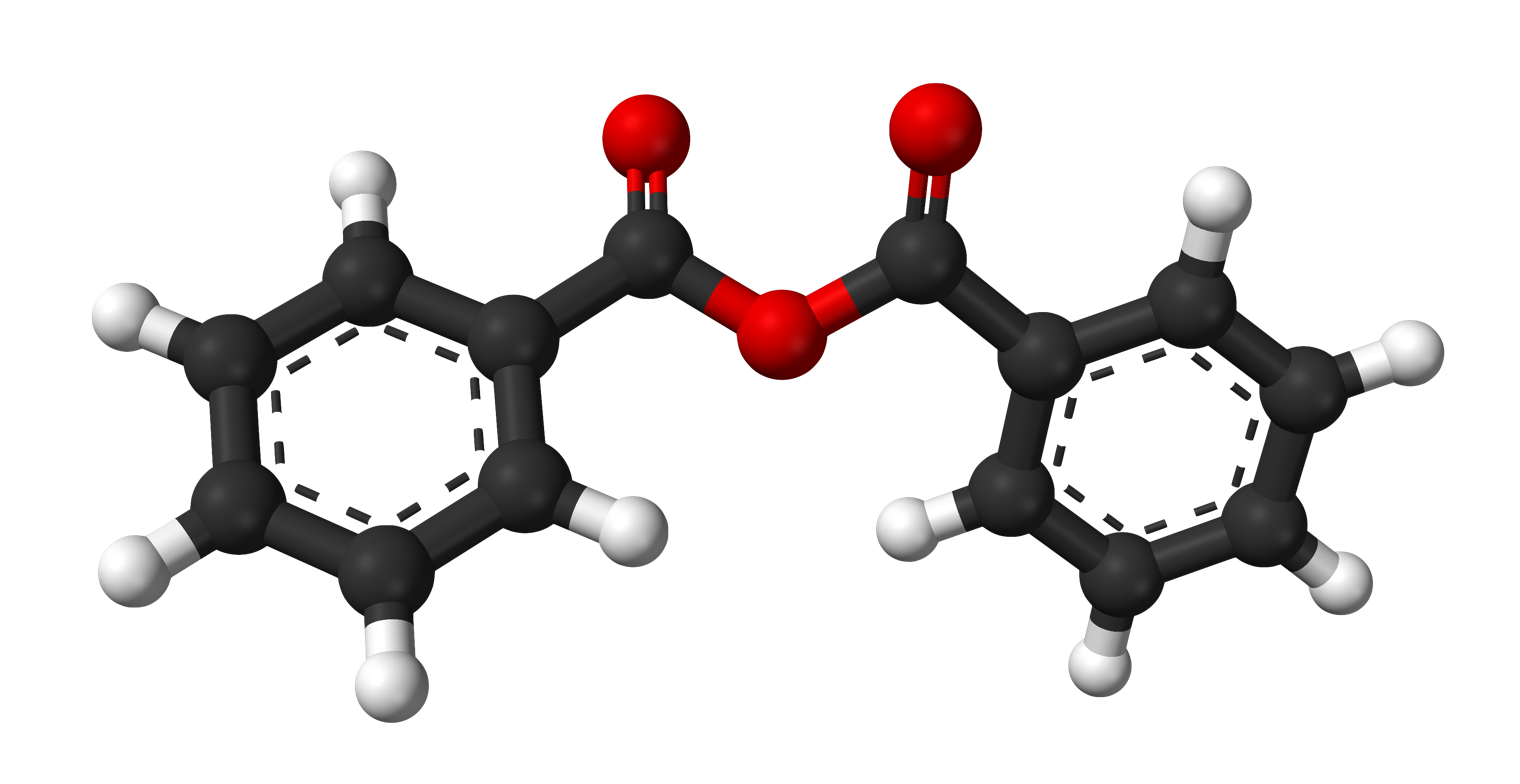

Names
- Preferred IUPAC name Benzoic anhydride
- Other names Benzoic acid anhydride Benzoyl anhydride Benzoyl benzoate

Identifiers
CAS Number	93-97-0
3D model (JSmol)	Interactive image
Abbreviations	Bz_{2}O
Beilstein Reference	516726
ChemSpider	6899
ECHA InfoCard	100.002.084
EC Number	202-291-1
PubChem CID	7167
UNII	9K7X34FOV2
CompTox Dashboard (EPA)	DTXSID1029122
- InChI: InChI=1S/C14H10O3/c15-13(11-7-3-1-4-8-11)17-14(16)12-9-5-2-6-10-12/h1-10H Key: CHIHQLCVLOXUJW-UHFFFAOYSA-N
- SMILES: c1ccccc1C(=O)OC(=O)c2ccccc2

Properties
Chemical formula	C_{14}H_{10}O_{3}
Molar mass	226.23 g mol^{−1}
Appearance	White to off-white solid
Density	1.1989 g cm^{−3} at 15 °C
Melting point	42 °C (108 °F; 315 K)
Boiling point	360 °C (680 °F; 633 K)
Magnetic susceptibility (χ)	−124.9·10^{−6} cm^{3}/mol

Hazards
NFPA 704 (fire diamond)	1 2 1
Flash point	113 °C (235 °F; 386 K)

Related compounds
Related compounds	Benzoic acid
- Except where otherwise noted, data are given for materials in their standard state (at 25 °C [77 °F], 100 kPa). Infobox references

Benzoic anhydride is the organic compound with the formula (C_{6}H_{5}CO)_{2}O. It is the acid anhydride of benzoic acid and the simplest symmetrical aromatic acid anhydride. It is a white solid.

== Preparation and reactions ==
It is usually prepared by the dehydration reaction of benzoic acid, e.g. using acetic anhydride:

2 C_{6}H_{5}CO_{2}H + (CH_{3}CO)_{2}O → (C_{6}H_{5}CO)_{2}O + 2 CH_{3}CO_{2}H

Alternatively, sodium benzoate can be treated with benzoyl chloride. It can be produced by dehydrating benzoic acid by heating.

Benzoic anhydride provides a convenient way to prepare benzoic esters:

(C_{6}H_{5}CO)_{2}O + ROH → C_{6}H_{5}CO_{2}H + C_{6}H_{5}CO_{2}R
