= Benzylmercapturic acid =

Names
- IUPAC name (2R)-2-Acetamido-3-(phenylmethylsulfanyl)propanoic acid
- Other names S-Benzyl-N-acetyl-L-cysteine; S-Benzylmercapturic acid

Identifiers
CAS Number	19542-77-9
3D model (JSmol)	Interactive image
Abbreviations	SBNAC
ChEBI	CHEBI:194360
ChemSpider	96963
PubChem CID	107816
UNII	X3H719RFPT
CompTox Dashboard (EPA)	DTXSID90894753
- InChI: InChI=1S/C12H15NO3S/c1-9(14)13-11(12(15)16)8-17-7-10-5-3-2-4-6-10/h2-6,11H,7-8H2,1H3,(H,13,14)(H,15,16)/t11-/m0/s1 Key: BJUXDERNWYKSIQ-NSHDSACASA-N; InChI=1/C12H15NO3S/c1-9(14)13-11(12(15)16)8-17-7-10-5-3-2-4-6-10/h2-6,11H,7-8H2,1H3,(H,13,14)(H,15,16)/t11-/m0/s1 Key: BJUXDERNWYKSIQ-NSHDSACABF
- SMILES: CC(=O)N[C@@H](CSCC1=CC=CC=C1)C(=O)O

Properties
Chemical formula	C_{12}H_{15}NO_{3}S
Molar mass	253.32 g/mol
Melting point	163 °C (325 °F; 436 K)
Boiling point	462 °C (864 °F; 735 K)
Solubility in water	very soluble
- Except where otherwise noted, data are given for materials in their standard state (at 25 °C [77 °F], 100 kPa). verify (what is ?) Infobox references

Benzylmercapturic acid is a minor metabolite of toluene in humans and is used in the diagnosis of toluene exposure. As its name indicates, is a benzyl derivative of mercapturic acid (acetylcysteine).
