= Sodium benzoate =

Common food preservative

- Sodium benzoate Skeletal formula

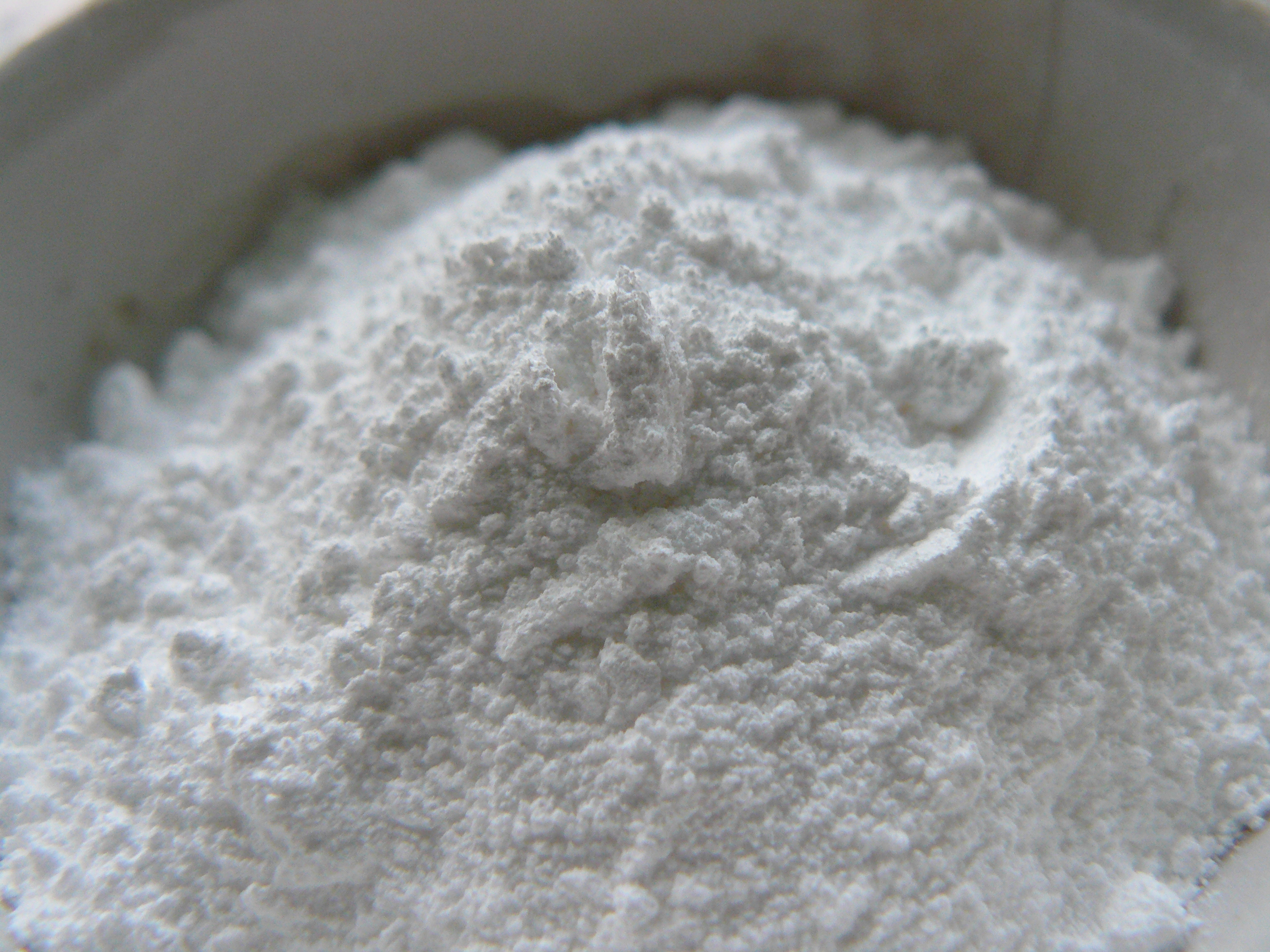
- Powder of sodium benzoate

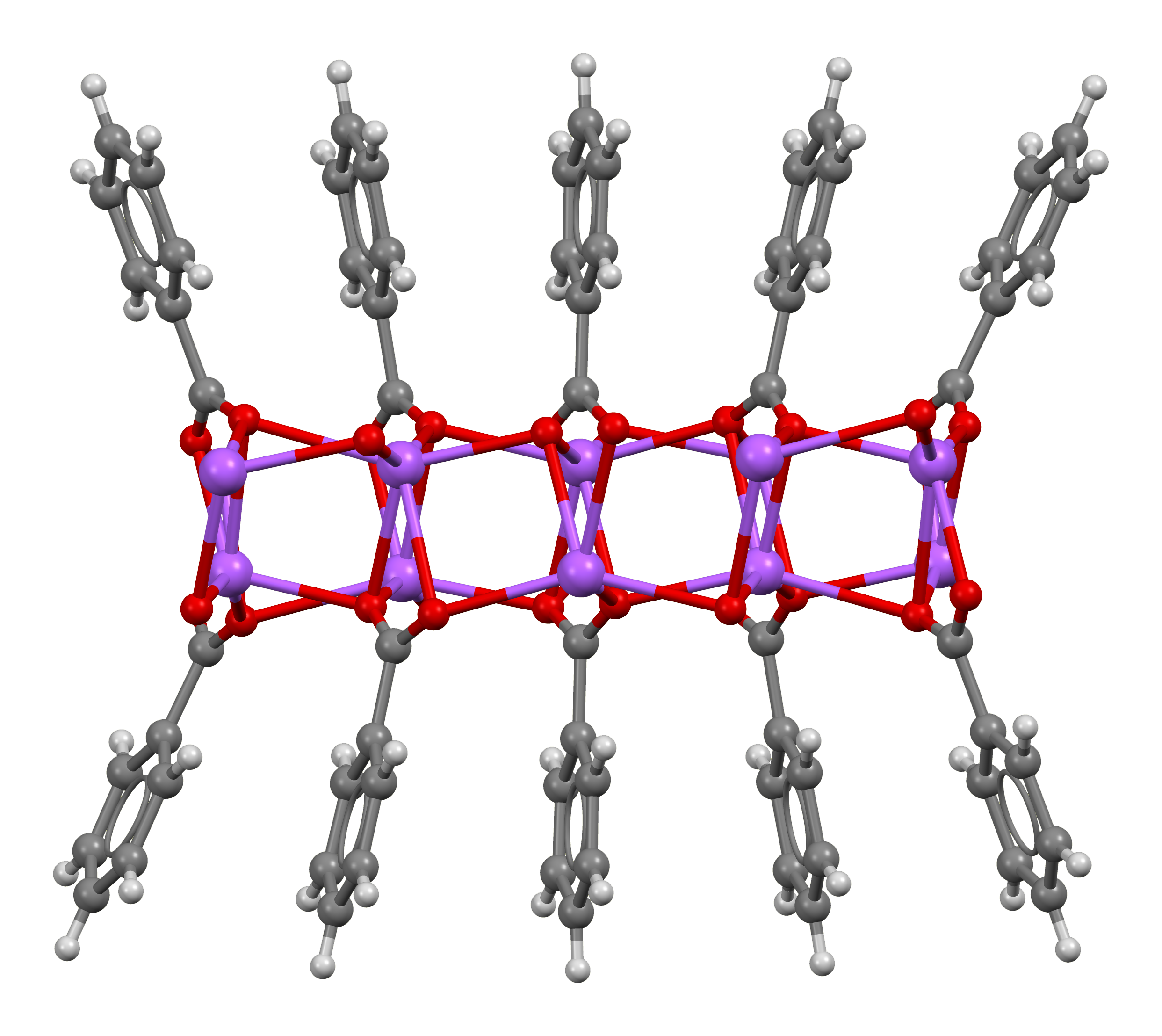
- Ball-and-stick model of part of the crystal structure

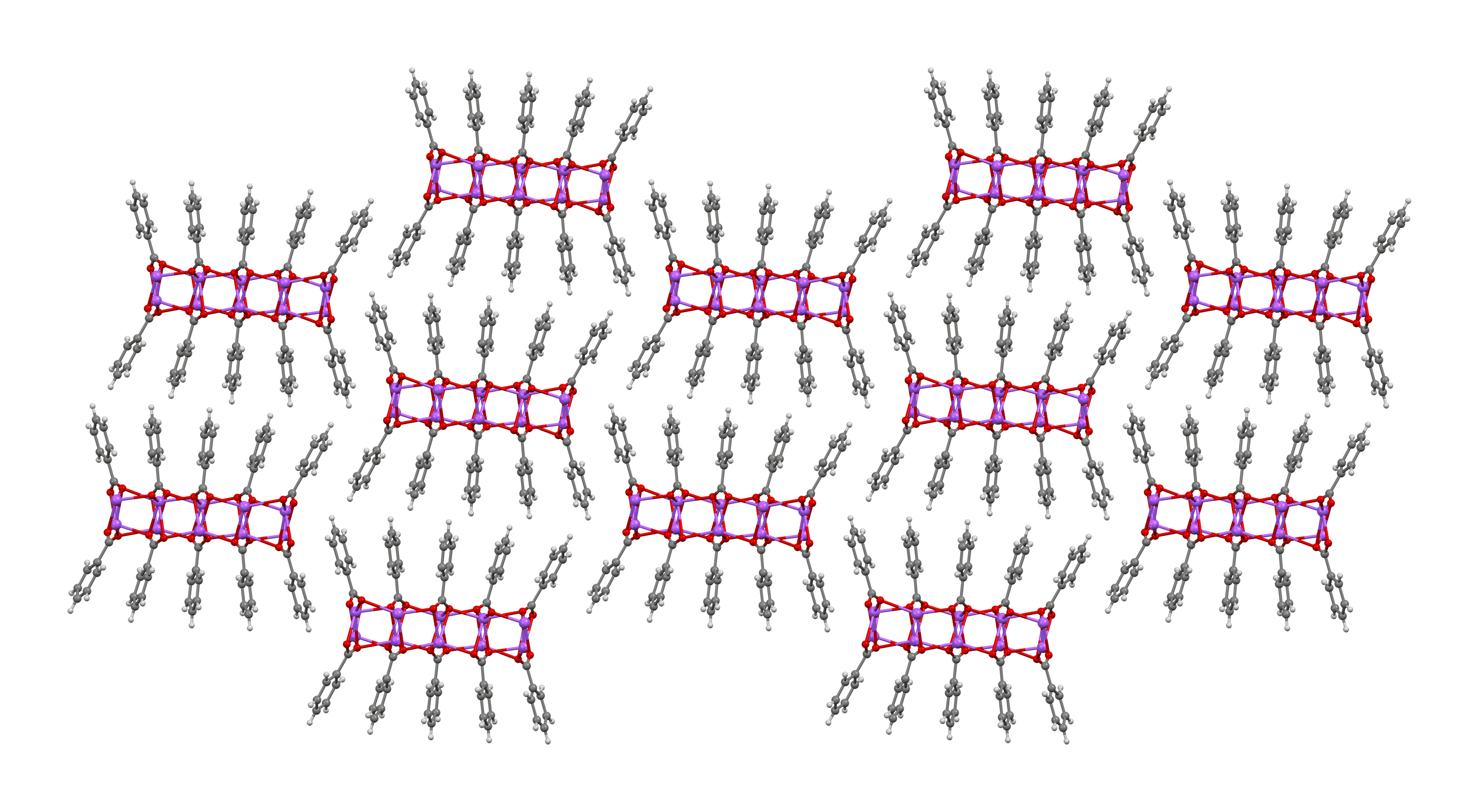
- Ball-and-stick model of packing in the crystal structure

Names
- Preferred IUPAC name Sodium benzoate
- Other names: E211; benzoate of soda

Identifiers
CAS Number	532-32-1
3D model (JSmol)	Interactive image
Abbreviations	BzONa; NaOBz
ChEBI	CHEBI:113455
ChEMBL	ChEMBL1356
ChemSpider	10305
ECHA InfoCard	100.007.760
E number	E211 (preservatives)
PubChem CID	517055
RTECS number	DH6650000
UNII	OJ245FE5EU
CompTox Dashboard (EPA)	DTXSID1020140
- InChI: InChI=1S/C7H6O2.Na/c8-7(9)6-4-2-1-3-5-6;/h1-5H,(H,8,9);/q;+1/p-1 Key: WXMKPNITSTVMEF-UHFFFAOYSA-M; InChI=1/C7H6O2.Na/c8-7(9)6-4-2-1-3-5-6;/h1-5H,(H,8,9);/q;+1/p-1 Key: WXMKPNITSTVMEF-REWHXWOFAY
- SMILES: [Na+].[O-]C(=O)c1ccccc1

Properties
Chemical formula	C_{7}H_{5}NaO_{2}
Molar mass	144.105 g·mol^{−1}
Appearance	white or colourless crystalline powder
Odor	odorless
Density	1.497 g/cm^{3}
Melting point	410 °C (770 °F; 683 K)
Solubility in water	62.65 g/100 mL (0 °C); 62.84 g/100 mL (15 °C); 62.87 g/100 mL (30 °C); 74.2 g/100 mL (100 °C)
Solubility	soluble in liquid ammonia, pyridine
Solubility in methanol	8.22 g/100 g (15 °C); 7.55 g/100 g (66.2 °C)
Solubility in ethanol	2.3 g/100 g (25 °C); 8.3 g/100 g (78 °C)
Solubility in 1,4-Dioxane	0.818 mg/kg (25 °C)

Pharmacology
ATC code	A16AX11 (WHO)

Hazards
- GHS labelling
Pictograms	(GHS07: Exclamation mark)
Signal word	Warning
Hazard statements	H319
Precautionary statements	P305+P351+P338
NFPA 704 (fire diamond)	2 1 0
Flash point	100 °C (212 °F; 373 K)
Autoignition temperature	500 °C (932 °F; 773 K)
- Lethal dose or concentration (LD, LC)
LD_{50} (median dose)	4100 mg/kg (oral, rat)
- Except where otherwise noted, data are given for materials in their standard state (at 25 °C [77 °F], 100 kPa). verify (what is ?) Infobox references

Sodium benzoate, also known as benzoate of soda, is the sodium salt of benzoic acid, widely used as a food preservative (with an E number of E211) and a pickling agent. It appears as a white crystalline chemical with the formula C_{6}H_{5}COONa.

== Production ==
Sodium benzoate is commonly produced by the neutralization of sodium hydroxide (NaOH) with benzoic acid (C_{6}H_{5}COOH), which is itself produced commercially by partial oxidation of toluene with oxygen.

== Reactions ==
Sodium benzoate can be decarboxylated with strong base and heat, yielding benzene and sodium carbonate:

C_{6}H_{5}COONa + NaOH → C_{6}H_{6} + Na_{2}CO_{3}

== Natural occurrence ==
Many foods are natural sources of benzoic acid, its salts, and its esters. Fruits and vegetables can be rich sources, particularly berries such as cranberry and bilberry. Other sources include seafood, such as prawns, and dairy products.

== Uses ==
=== As a preservative ===
Sodium benzoate can act as a food preservative. It is most widely used in acidic foods such as salad dressings (for example acetic acid in vinegar), carbonated drinks (carbonic acid), jams and fruit juices (citric acid), pickles (acetic acid), condiments, and frozen yogurt toppings. It is also used as a preservative in medicines and cosmetics. Under these conditions it is converted into benzoic acid (E210), which is bacteriostatic and fungistatic. Benzoic acid is generally not used directly due to its poor water solubility. Concentration as a food preservative is limited by the FDA in the U.S. to 0.1% by weight. Sodium benzoate is also allowed as an animal food additive at up to 0.1%, per the Association of American Feed Control Officials. Sodium benzoate has been replaced by potassium sorbate in the majority of soft drinks in the United Kingdom.

In the 19th century, sodium benzoate as a food ingredient was investigated by Harvey W. Wiley with his 'Poison Squad' as part of the US Department of Agriculture. This led to the 1906 Pure Food and Drug Act, a key event in the early history of food regulation in the United States.

=== In pharmaceuticals ===
Sodium benzoate is used as a treatment for urea cycle disorders due to its ability to bind amino acids. This leads to excretion of these amino acids and a decrease in ammonia levels. Recent research shows that sodium benzoate may be beneficial as an add-on therapy (1 gram/day) in schizophrenia. Total Positive and Negative Syndrome Scale scores dropped by 21% compared to placebo.

Sodium benzoate, along with phenylbutyrate, is used to treat hyperammonemia.

Sodium benzoate, along with caffeine, is used to treat postdural puncture headache, respiratory depression associated with overdosage of narcotics, and has been used experimentally with ergotamine to treat vascular headache.

=== Other uses ===
Sodium benzoate is also used in fireworks as a fuel in whistle mix, a powder that emits a whistling noise when compressed into a tube and ignited.

== Mechanism of food preservation ==
The mechanism starts with the absorption of benzoic acid into the cell. If the intracellular pH falls to 5 or lower, the anaerobic fermentation of glucose through phosphofructokinase decreases sharply, which inhibits the growth and survival of microorganisms that cause food spoilage.

== Health and safety ==
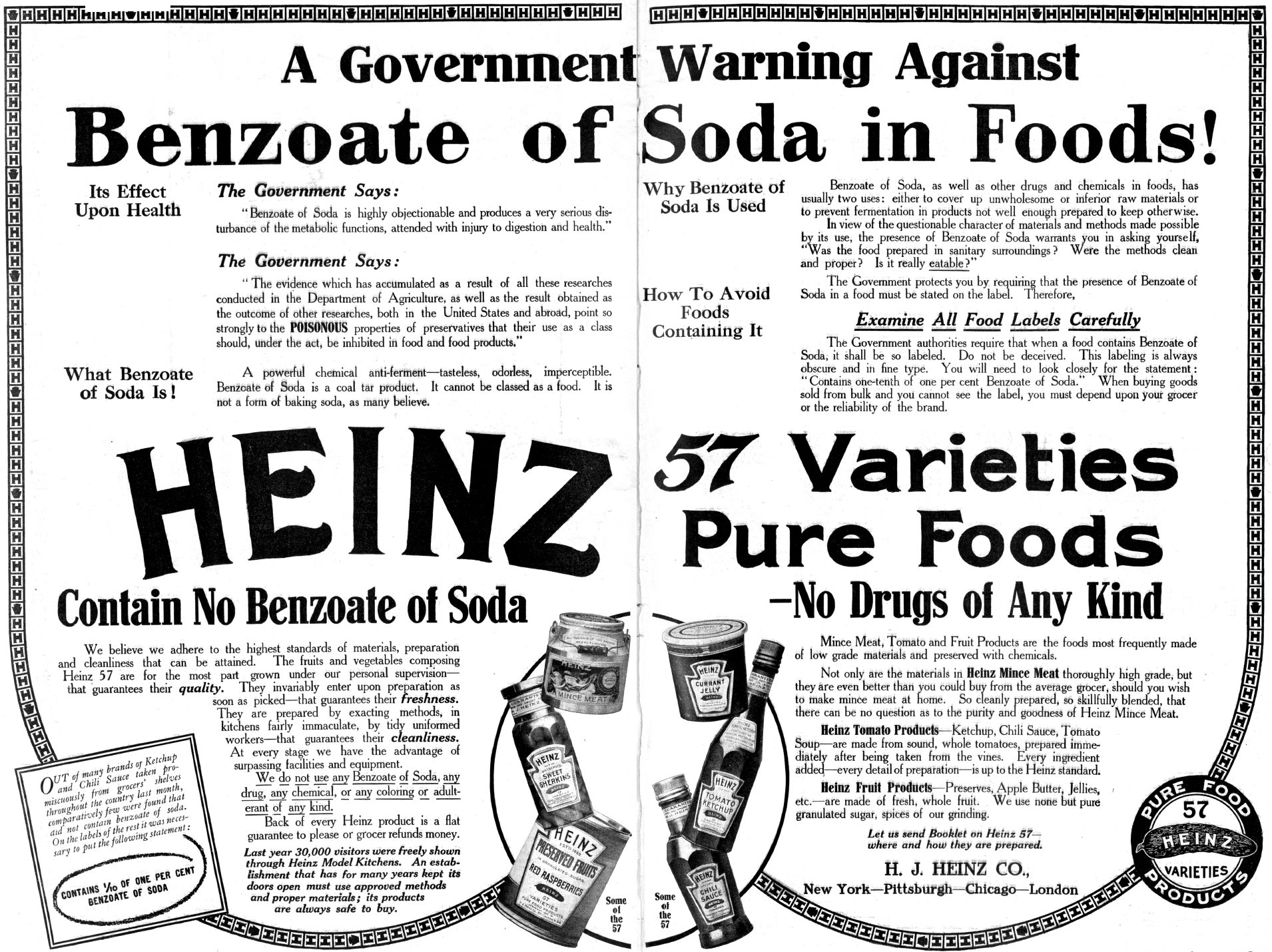
1909 Heinz advertisement against sodium benzoate

In the United States, sodium benzoate is designated as generally recognized as safe (GRAS) by the Food and Drug Administration. The International Programme on Chemical Safety found no adverse effects in rats at doses of 647–825 mg/kg of body weight per day.

Cats have a significantly lower tolerance against benzoic acid and its salts than rats and mice.

The human body rapidly clears sodium benzoate by combining it with glycine to form hippuric acid which is then excreted. The metabolic pathway for this begins with the conversion of benzoate by butyrate-CoA ligase into an intermediate product, benzoyl-CoA, which is then metabolized by glycine N-acyltransferase into hippuric acid.

=== Association with benzene in soft drinks and pepper sauces ===
In combination with ascorbic acid (vitamin C, E300), sodium benzoate and potassium benzoate may form benzene. In 2006, the Food and Drug Administration tested 100 beverages available in the United States that contained both ascorbic acid and benzoate. Four had benzene levels that were above the 5 ppb Maximum Contaminant Level set by the Environmental Protection Agency for drinking water. Most of the beverages that tested above the limit have been reformulated and subsequently tested below the safety limit. Heat, light and shelf life can increase the rate at which benzene is formed. Hot peppers naturally contain vitamin C ("nearly as much as in one orange") so the observation about beverages applies to pepper sauces containing sodium benzoate, like Texas Pete.

=== ADHD and hyperactivity ===
Research published, including in 2007 for the UK's Food Standards Agency (FSA) suggests that certain artificial colors, when paired with sodium benzoate, may be linked to hyperactive behavior and other ADHD symptoms. The results were inconsistent regarding sodium benzoate, so the FSA recommended further study. The Food Standards Agency concluded that the observed increases in hyperactive behavior, if real, were more likely to be linked to the artificial colors than to sodium benzoate. The report's author, Jim Stevenson from Southampton University, said: "The results suggest that consumption of certain mixtures of artificial food colours and sodium benzoate preservative are associated with increases in hyperactive behaviour in children. ... Many other influences are at work but this at least is one a child can avoid."

== Compendial status ==
- British Pharmacopoeia
- European Pharmacopoeia
- Food Chemicals Codex
- Japanese Pharmacopoeia
- United States Pharmacopeia

== See also ==
- Acceptable daily intake
- List of investigational antipsychotics
- Potassium benzoate
