= Liability insurance =

Insurance that covers legal liability for injury, damage, or loss caused to others

Liability insurance (also called third-party insurance) is a part of the general insurance system of risk financing to protect the purchaser (the “insured”) from the risks of liabilities imposed by lawsuits and similar claims and protects the insured if the purchaser is sued for claims that come within the coverage of the insurance policy.

Originally, individual companies that faced a common peril formed a group and created a self-help fund out of which to pay compensation should any member incur loss (in other words, a mutual insurance arrangement). The modern system relies on dedicated carriers, usually for-profit, to offer protection against specified perils in consideration of a premium.

Liability insurance is designed to offer specific protection against third-party insurance claims, i.e., payment is not typically made to the insured, but rather to someone suffering loss who is not a party to the insurance contract. In general, intentional damage and contractual liability are not covered under liability insurance policies. When a claim is made, the insurance carrier has the duty (and right) to defend the insured.

The legal costs of a defence normally do not affect policy limits unless the policy expressly states otherwise; this default rule is useful because defense costs tend to soar when cases go to trial. Often, the defense portion of the policy is more valuable than the insurance, as in complicated cases, the cost of defending the case might be more than the amount being claimed, particularly in “nuisance” cases, where the insured must be defended even though no liability is ever brought to trial.

== Market ==
Commercial liability is an important segment for the insurance industry. With premium income of US$160 billion in 2013, it accounted for 10% of global non-life premiums of US$1,550 billion, or 23% of the global commercial premiums. Liability insurance is far more prevalent in advanced than in emerging markets. The advanced markets accounted for 93% of global liability premiums in 2013, while their share of global non-life premiums was 79%.

The US is by far the largest market, with 51% of the global liability premiums written in 2013. This is due to the size of the US economy and the high penetration of liability insurance (0.5% of GDP). In 2013, US businesses spent US$84 billion on commercial liability covers, of which US$50 billion was on general liability, including US$12 billion for Errors and Omissions (E&O) and US$5.4 billion for Directors and Officers (D&O). US businesses spent another US$13 billion on the liability portion of commercial multi-peril policies, US$9.5 billion for medical malpractice, and US$3 billion for product liability covers.

The UK is the world's second largest market for liability insurance, with US$9.9 billion of liability premiums in 2013. The largest sub-line of business is public and product liability. This is followed by professional indemnity and employers’ liability (cover for employment-related accidents and illnesses). There has been a significant shift in the sub-segments of UK liability insurance. In the last decade, the share of professional indemnity has increased from about 14% to 32%, highlighting the shift towards a more services-driven economy. Manufacturing, meanwhile, comprises a lower share of liability claims as accidents related to injuries and property damages have declined.

In continental Europe, the largest liability insurance markets are Germany, France, Italy, and Spain. Together they made up almost US$22 billion of global liability premiums in 2013. Typically governed by civil law systems, these markets rely on local conditions and historical experience to determine which liability policies and covers are available. Penetration ranges from 0.16% to 0.25%, which is low compared to the common law countries such as the US, the UK and Australia.

Japan and Australia are the largest markets in the Asia Pacific region, with commercial liability premiums of US$6.0 billion and US$4.8 billion, respectively, in 2013. At 0.12% of GDP, liability insurance penetration in Japan is much lower than in other advanced economies. In Australia, penetration is much higher at 0.32% of GDP. This is due to the country's English law-derived legal framework, which has increased demand for employers’ liability insurance. Australia has mandatory covers for aviation, maritime oil pollution, and residential construction and, in certain states, for medical practitioners, property brokers, and stock brokers. Liability insurance premiums have grown at an average annual rate of 11% since 2000.

China is the ninth largest commercial liability market globally, with premiums of US$3.5 billion in 2013 and strong annual average growth of 22% since 2000. However, penetration remains low at 0.04% of GDP. Growth has been driven by increasing risk awareness and regulatory changes.

== Insurer duties ==
Liability insurers have one, two, or three major duties, depending upon the jurisdiction:

1. the duty to defend,
2. the duty to indemnify, and
3. the duty to settle a reasonably clear claim.

=== To defend ===
The duty to defend is prevalent in the United States and Canada, where most liability insurance policies provide that the insurer “has the right and duty” to defend the insured against all “suits” to which the policies apply. It is usually triggered when the insured is sued (or in some instances, given pre-suit notice that they are about to be sued) and subsequently “tenders” defense of the claim to its liability insurer. Usually this is done by sending a copy of the complaint along with a cover letter referencing the relevant insurance policy or policies and demanding an immediate defense.

In most U.S. states and Canada, the insurer generally has four main options at this point, to:

1. defend the insured unconditionally;
2. defend the insured under a reservation of rights;
3. seek a declaratory judgment that it has no duty to defend the claim; or
4. decline to defend or to seek a declaratory judgment.

The duty to defend is generally broader than the duty to indemnify, because most (but not all) policies that provide for such a duty also specifically promise to defend against claims that are groundless, false, or fraudulent. Therefore, the duty to defend is normally triggered by a potential for coverage. The test for a potential for coverage is whether the complaint adequately pleads at least one claim or cause of action which would be covered under the terms of the policy if the plaintiff were to prevail on that claim at trial, and also does not plead any allegations which would entirely vitiate an essential element of coverage or trigger a complete exclusion to coverage. It is irrelevant whether the plaintiff will prevail or actually prevails on the claim; rather, the test is whether the claim if proven would be covered. Vague or ambiguous allegations broad enough to encompass a range of possibilities both within and without coverage are usually construed in favor of a potential for coverage, but speculation about unpled allegations (that is, matters on which the complaint is totally silent) is insufficient to create a potential for coverage. Some jurisdictions allow extrinsic evidence to be considered, either because it is expressly described in the complaint or it is relevant to the facts expressly alleged in the complaint.

If there is a duty to defend, it means the insurer must defend the insured against the entire lawsuit even if most of the claims or causes of action in the complaint are clearly not covered. An insurer can choose to defend unconditionally without reserving any rights, but by doing so, it waives (or is later estopped from asserting) the absence of coverage as a defense to the duty to defend and impliedly commits to defending the insured to a final judgment or a settlement regardless of how long it takes (unless the policy expressly provides that defense costs reduce policy limits). In the alternative, the insurer may defend under a reservation of rights: it sends a letter to the insured reserving its rights to immediately withdraw from the insured's defense if it becomes clear there is no coverage or no potential for coverage for the entire complaint and to recover from the insured any funds expended to that point on defending against any particular claims or causes of action that were never covered or even potentially covered to begin with.

If the insurer chooses to defend, it may either defend the claim with its own in-house lawyers (where allowed) or give the claim to an outside law firm on a “panel” of preferred firms that have negotiated a standard fee schedule with the insurer in exchange for a regular flow of work. The decision to defend under a reservation of rights must be undertaken with extreme caution in jurisdictions where the insured has a right to independent counsel, also known as Cumis counsel.

The insurer can also seek a declaratory judgment against the insured that there is no coverage for the claim, or at least no potential for coverage. This option generally allows the insurer to insulate itself from a bad faith claim, in the sense that an insurer acts in good faith when it promptly brings coverage disputes to the attention of a court, even though it also places the insured in the awkward position of defending itself against two lawsuits: the plaintiff's original complaint and the insurer's complaint for declaratory judgment. Indeed, in some jurisdictions, an insurer acting in good faith must seek declaratory relief from a court before declining to defend its insured (e.g., Illinois) or withdrawing from its defense pursuant to an earlier reservation of rights (e.g., Georgia).

Finally, the insurer can decline to defend and also refrain from seeking declaratory judgment. If the insurer is absolutely certain that there is no coverage or no potential for coverage, then in most jurisdictions the insurer adequately preserves its defenses to coverage by sending a letter to the insured explaining its position and declining to provide a defense. But this option can be very risky, because if a court later determines that there was a duty to defend all along, then it will hold that the insurer necessarily breached that duty and may also hold that the insurer is subject to tort liability for bad faith. So insurers will often defend under a reservation of rights rather than decline coverage altogether.

Outside the United States and Canada, liability insurers generally do not assume a duty to defend, in the sense of assuming a direct responsibility for hiring and paying a lawyer to defend the insured. Many write policies that promise to reimburse the insured for reasonable defense costs incurred with the insurer's consent, but this is essentially a form of indemnification (covered in the next section below), under which the insured remains primarily responsible for hiring a lawyer to defend themselves. Such insurers often expressly reserve a right to defend the insured, presumably so they can intervene to protect their interests if the insured's counsel of choice is not providing an adequate defense against the underlying claim.

=== To indemnify ===
An indemnity case arises when an individual is obliged to pay for the loss or damage incurred by another person in the event of an accident, collision, etc. The duty of indemnity generally originates from the agreement between the insurer and insured, which protects the insured against any liability, damage, or loss.

The duty to indemnify is the insurer's duty to pay all covered sums for which the insured is held liable, up to the limits of coverage and subject to any deductibles, retained limits, self-insured retention, excess payments, or any other amounts of money that the insured is required to pay out-of-pocket as a precondition to the insurer's duty.

It is generally triggered when a final judgment is entered against the insured, and it is satisfied when the insurer pays such covered amounts to the plaintiff who obtained the judgment. Most policies provide for payment of monetary damages as well as any costs, expenses, and attorney's fees that the plaintiff may also be entitled to as the prevailing party.

Unlike the duty to defend, the duty to indemnify extends only to those claims or causes of action in the plaintiff's complaint which are actually covered under the policy, since a final judgement against the insured would normally be supported by a factual record in the trial court showing exactly why the plaintiff prevailed (or failed to prevail) on each claim or cause of action. Thus, an insurer could have a duty to defend based on mere allegations that show a potential for coverage, but may not have a duty to indemnify if the evidence supporting a final judgement against the insured also takes those claims or causes of action completely outside the policy's scope of coverage. Conversely, it is also possible that an insurer may have no duty to defend based on the initial allegations of the plaintiff's original complaint, but may have a duty to indemnify based upon the policyholder's proven liability.

While the duty to defend and the duty to settle are rare outside English-speaking North America, the duty to indemnify is universally found in liability insurance policies.

=== To settle reasonable claims ===
In some jurisdictions, there is a third duty, the duty to settle a reasonably clear claim against the insured. This duty is generally triggered only if a reasonable opportunity to settle actually arises, either because the plaintiff makes a settlement offer or the insurer is aware of information to the effect that the plaintiff would accept a settlement offer. The insurer is neither required to initiate an offer to a plaintiff likely to refuse it nor required to accept an outrageous offer from a plaintiff who filed a frivolous lawsuit and cannot prevail against the insured under any theory.

The duty to settle is of the greatest importance in the scenario where the insured may have some liability exposure (i.e., there is some evidence apparently linking the insured to the causation of the plaintiff's alleged injuries), the plaintiff has evidence of substantial damages which may exceed policy limits, and the plaintiff makes a settlement demand which equals or exceeds policy limits. In that situation, the insurer's interests conflict with the insured's interests, because the insurer has an incentive to not immediately settle. That is, if the insurer refuses to settle and the case then goes to trial, there are only two possible outcomes: (1) the insured loses and the insurer must pay the ensuing judgment against the insured up to the policy limits, or (2) the insured wins, meaning both the insured and the insurer bear no liability. If the first outcome occurs, then it is essentially “nothing gained nothing lost” from the insurer's perspective, because either way it will pay out its policy limits. (For simplicity, this analysis disregards sunk costs in the form of defense costs incurred to that point, as well as additional costs sustained by the insurer in defending the insured to a verdict at trial, and opportunity costs sustained by the insured while participating in trial.)

While the insurer may be indifferent in this scenario whether it pays out its policy limits before or after trial, the insured is most certainly not. If the first outcome above were to occur, the insured may be held liable to the plaintiff for a sum far exceeding both the pretrial settlement offer and the policy limits. Then after the insurer pays out its policy limits, the plaintiff may attempt to recover the remaining balance of the judgment by enforcing writs of attachment or execution against the insured's valuable assets.

This is where the duty to settle comes in. To discourage the insurer from gambling with the insured's assets in pursuit of the remote possibility of a defense verdict (under which it can avoid having to pay the plaintiff anything at all), the insurer is subject to a duty to settle reasonably clear claims. The standard judicial test is that an insurer must settle a claim if a reasonable insurer, notwithstanding any policy limits, would have settled the claim. This does not require an insurer to accept or pay settlement offers that actually exceed policy limits, but in that instance, the insurer must discharge its duty to settle by at least attempting to bring about a settlement in which it would have to pay only its policy limits (either because the plaintiff agrees to lower their demand or the insured or another primary or excess insurer agrees to contribute the difference).

=== Effects of breach ===
Generally, an insurer who breaches any of the foregoing duties will be held liable for breach of contract. In most jurisdictions, the result is a judgment requiring payment of the insured's expectation damages—the sums that the insurer should have paid under its duty to indemnify. But this will be circumscribed by the policy limits, and will generally not compensate the insured for losses incurred due to the insurer's breach, such as lost business opportunities when money intended to be invested in those opportunities was diverted (or seized) to pay judgments.

In the United States (and to a lesser extent, Canada), an insurer who breaches any of these three duties in a particularly egregious fashion may also be held liable for the tort of insurance bad faith, under which the insured may be able to recover compensatory damages exceeding the policy limits, as well as punitive damages.

=== Occurrence v. claims-made policies ===
Traditionally, liability insurance was written on an occurrence basis, meaning that the insurer agreed to defend and indemnify against any loss that allegedly “occurred” during the policy period as a result of an act or omission of the insured. This was originally not a problem because it was thought that insureds' tort liability was predictably limited by doctrines like proximate cause and statutes of limitations. In other words, it was thought that no sane plaintiffs' lawyer would sue in 1978 for a tortious act that allegedly caused a covered loss in 1953, because the risk of dismissal was so obvious.

In the 1970s and 1980s, many major toxic tort (primarily involving asbestos and diethylstilbestrol) and environmental liabilities resulted in numerous judicial decisions and statutes that radically extended the so-called “long tail” of vulnerable policies. Policyholders started to argue that losses began to occur not only at the time of a plaintiff's diagnosis or the belated discovery of underground pollution, but from the time a plaintiff received the first of many cumulative exposures to a toxic substance or when the defendant initially released pollutants, and that such losses continued to keep occurring through every subsequent policy period (though they did not ripen into lawsuits until much later). The result was that insurers who had long ago closed their books on policies written 20, 30, or 40 years earlier now found that their insureds were being hit with hundreds of thousands of lawsuits that potentially implicated those old policies. A body of law has developed concerning which policies must respond to these continuous injury or “long tail” claims, with many courts holding multiple policies may be implicated by the application of an exposure, continuous injury, or injury-in-fact trigger and others holding that only the policy in effect at the time the injuries or damages are discovered is implicated.

The insurance industry reacted in two ways to these developments. First, premiums on new occurrence policies skyrocketed, since the industry had come to a better appreciation of the true risks associated with such policy language. Second, the industry began issuing claims-made policies, in which the policy covers only those claims that are first “made” against the insured during the policy period. A related variation is the claims-made-and-reported policy, in which the policy covers only those claims that are first made against the insured and reported by the insured to the insurer during the policy period (which often include a grace period for reporting after the end of the policy period to protect insureds who are sued at the very end of the policy term).

Claims-made policies enable insurers to again sharply limit their own long-term liability on each policy and, in turn, to close their books on policies and record a profit. Hence, such policies are much more affordable than occurrence policies and are very popular for that reason. Of course, claims-made policies shift the burden to insureds to immediately report new claims to insurers. They also force insureds to become more proactive about risk management and finding ways to control their own long-tail liability.

Claims-made policies often include strict clauses that require insureds to report even potential claims and that combine an entire series of related acts into a single claim. This puts insureds in a position of trading off timely reporting of every “potential” claim (i.e., every slip-and-fall on their premises), even if those never ripen into actual lawsuits, and thereby protects their right to coverage, at the expense of making themselves look more risky and driving up their insurance premiums. Or they can wait until they actually get sued, but then they run the risk that the claim will be denied because it should have been reported back when the underlying accident first occurred.

Claims-made coverage also makes it harder for insureds to switch insurers, as well as to wind up and shut down their operations. It is possible to purchase “tail coverage” for such situations, but only at premiums much higher than for conventional claims-made policies, since the insurer is being asked to re-assume the kind of liabilities that claims-made policies were intended to push to insureds to begin with.

Not surprisingly, insureds recognized what the insurance industry was up to in trying to use claims-made policies to push a substantial amount of risk back to insureds, and claims-made coverage was the subject of extensive litigation in several countries throughout the 1970s, 1980s, and 1990s. This led to important decisions of the U.S. Supreme Court in 1978 and 1993 and of the Supreme Court of Canada in 1993.

=== Retained limits and SIRs ===
One way for businesses to cut down their liability insurance premiums is to negotiate a policy with a retained limit or self-insured retention (SIR), which is similar to a deductible. With such policies, the insured is essentially agreeing to self-insure and self-defend for smaller claims and to tender and demand a defense only for liability claims that exceed a certain value. However, writing such insurance is itself risky for insurers. The California Courts of Appeal have held that primary insurers on policies with a SIR must still provide an “immediate, 'first dollar' defense” (subject, of course, to their right to later recover the SIR amount from the insured) unless the policy expressly imposes exhaustion of the SIR as a precondition to the duty to defend.

== Types ==
In many countries, liability insurance is a compulsory form of insurance for those at risk of being sued by third parties for negligence. The most usual classes of mandatory policy cover the drivers of motor vehicles (vehicle insurance), those who offer professional services to the public, those who manufacture products that may be harmful, constructors, and those who offer employment. The reason for such laws is that the classes of insured are deliberately engaging in activities that put others at risk of injury or loss. Public policy therefore requires that such individuals be insured so that, if their activities do cause loss or damage to another, money will be available to pay compensation. In addition, there are a further range of perils that people insure against, and, consequently, the number and range of liability policies have increased in line with the rise of contingency fee litigation offered by lawyers (sometimes on a class action basis). Such policies fall into several classes:

=== Public liability ===
Industry and commerce are based on a range of processes and activities that have the potential to affect third parties (members of the public, visitors, trespassers, subcontractors, etc. who may be physically injured or whose property may be damaged or both). It varies from state to state whether either or both employer's liability insurance and public liability insurance have been made compulsory by law. Regardless of compulsion, however, most organizations include public liability insurance in their insurance portfolio even though the conditions, exclusions, and warranties included within the standard policies can be a burden. A company owning an industrial facility, for instance, may buy pollution insurance to cover lawsuits resulting from environmental accidents.

Many small businesses do not secure general or professional liability insurance due to the high cost of premiums. However, in the event of a claim, out-of-pocket costs for a legal defense or settlement can far exceed premium costs. In some cases, the costs of a claim could be enough to shut down a small business.

Businesses must consider all potential risk exposures when deciding whether liability insurance is needed and, if so, how much coverage is appropriate and cost-effective. Those with the greatest public liability risk exposure are occupiers of premises where large numbers of third parties frequent at leisure, including shopping centers, pubs, clubs, theaters, cinemas, sporting venues, markets, hotels, and resorts. The risk increases dramatically when consumption of alcohol and sporting events is included. Certain industries, such as security and cleaning, are considered high risk by underwriters. In some cases, underwriters even refuse to insure the liability of these industries or choose to apply a large deductible to minimize the potential compensations. Private individuals also occupy land and engage in potentially dangerous activities. For example, a rotten branch may fall from an old tree and injure a pedestrian, and many people ride bicycles and skateboards in public places. The majority of states require motorists to carry insurance and criminalize those who drive without a valid policy. Many also require insurance companies to provide a default fund to offer compensation to those physically injured in accidents where the driver did not have a valid policy.

In many countries, claims are dealt with under common law principles established through a long history of case law and if litigated, are made by way of civil actions in the relevant jurisdiction.

=== Product liability ===
Product liability insurance is not a compulsory class of insurance in all countries, but legislation such as the EC Directive on Product Liability (25/7/85) and the UK's Consumer Protection Act 1987 create a strict liability regime “without fault”, and businesses manufacturing or supplying goods often carry some form of product liability insurance, usually as part of a combined liability policy. The scale of potential liability is illustrated by cases such as those involving Mercedes-Benz for unstable vehicles and Perrier for benzene contamination, but the full list covers pharmaceuticals and medical devices, asbestos, tobacco, recreational equipment, mechanical and electrical products, chemicals and pesticides, agricultural products and equipment, food contamination, and all other major product classes.

=== Employers and workers compensation ===
Laws regarding workers compensation, which compensate an employee, vary by country, but the Workers’ Accident Insurance system put into place by Otto von Bismarck in 1881 is often cited as a model for Europe and later the United States.

In many legal jurisdictions, workers compensation is compulsory depending upon the business, including the United Kingdom and many states of the United States, with the notable exception of Texas as of 2018. Regardless of compulsory requirements, businesses may purchase insurance voluntarily, and in the United States, policies typically include Part One for compulsory coverage and Part Two for non-compulsory coverage.

Original jurisdiction over workers' compensation claims has been diverted in much of the United States to administrative proceedings outside the federal and state courts. They operate as no-fault schemes in which the employee need not prove the employer's fault; it is sufficient for the employee to prove that the injury occurred in the course of employment. If a third party besides the employer caused the injury, then the workers' compensation insurer (or self-insured employer) who is ordered to pay an employee's claim is usually entitled to initiate a subrogation action in the regular court system against the third party. In turn, workers' compensation insurance is regulated and underwritten separately from liability insurance. Just as the Insurance Services Office develops standard liability insurance forms and obtains approval for them from state insurance commissioners, the National Council on Compensation Insurance (NCCI) and various state rating bureaus provide similar services in the workers' compensation context.

U.S. workers' compensation insurance generally covers only bodily injury to and death of employees, but it does not always cover other persons who may suffer injury as a direct result of such bodily injury or death. U.S. employers often carry Employers' Liability coverage (which is not necessarily compulsory) to protect themselves from lawsuits from such persons who would still have the right to sue them in the courts, such as an employee's spouse who claims loss of consortium as a result of the employee's bodily injury on the job, which was allegedly caused by the employer's negligence.

=== Personal liability ===
Personal liability or private liability insurance covers claims that are made against the policyholder (and often also against other members of their household), usually limited to a private context. They commonly cover claims arising from private accidents, such as damaging someone's personal property, or from traffic accidents when not driving a motor vehicle. Personal liability insurance usually excludes claims that arise from professional activity (such as causing an accident at work), and claims that are covered by a more specific insurance, such as the liability insurance for a home or a motor vehicle. Particularly risky activities are also sometimes excluded, such as driving a motorboat or riding a horse.

Personal liability is sometimes offered as a separate contract, and sometimes as a part of another insurance policy, such as home insurance.

=== Management and employment practices liability ===
Workers' compensation also does not cover intangible torts that merely cause emotional distress, or torts arising from management negligence and liability to shareholders. General management liability coverage may include directors and officers (D&O) liability insurance, employment practices liability (EPL) insurance, fiduciary liability insurance, and “special crime” insurance (kidnap, ransom, and extortion), either individually or as part of a cohesive package.

Employment practices liability arose in the 1980s, after U.S. employees began to obtain jury verdicts against their employers due to workplace actions such as wrongful dismissal. Insurance Services Office (ISO), a vendor of standard form contract insurance policies, revised the Commercial General Liability insurance policy form to exclude coverage for torts related to the employer-employee relationship like racial or gender discrimination in the workplace, as well as liability for negligent supervision of midlevel managers who committed such torts. Thereafter, specific policy forms were created to cover this specific risk.

=== Excess insurance ===
Excess insurance is a type of liability insurance that provides coverage for losses exceeding the limits of an underlying primary insurance policy. Unlike primary insurance, which responds first to a claim up to its specified limit, excess insurance activates only after the primary coverage is exhausted, offering additional financial protection against significant or catastrophic losses. For example, if a primary auto insurance policy has a liability limit of $100,000 and a claim amounts to $150,000, an excess policy with a $50,000 limit would cover the remaining $50,000 after the primary policy pays out.

Excess insurance is commonly used in personal and commercial contexts and is distinct from umbrella insurance, though the terms are sometimes confused in casual usage. In British English, “excess” also refers to a deductible—the amount a policyholder pays out-of-pocket before insurance kicks in—but here it denotes additional coverage layers.

Excess insurance can take several forms, depending on its structure and purpose:

- Stand-Alone Excess Policies: These have their terms, conditions, and exclusions, independent of the primary policy. They are tailored to specific risks or higher limits.
- Follow-Form Excess Policies: These mirror the terms and coverage of the underlying primary policy, only extending the financial limit. They are common in commercial insurance.

Excess insurance differs from umbrella insurance. While both provide coverage above primary limits, umbrella policies often broaden the scope of coverage (e.g., including risks not covered by the primary policy), whereas excess insurance typically adheres to the primary policy's scope, only increasing the monetary ceiling.

== General liability ==
General Liability Insurance is the kind of coverage that provides an individual with protection against a variety of claims, which may include bodily injuries, physical damage to cars, property damage, etc., arising from business operations.

General Liability Insurance (GP) covers numerous businesses, and the norms of insurance may vary from company to company as well as area to area. Many of the public and product liability risks are often covered together under a general liability policy. These risks may include bodily injury or property damage caused by direct or indirect actions of the insured.

In the United States, general liability insurance coverage most often appears in the Commercial General Liability policies obtained by businesses, and in homeowners' insurance policies obtained by individual homeowners.

== Insurable risks ==
Generally, liability insurance covers only the risk of being sued for negligence or strict liability torts, but not any tort or crime with a higher level of mens rea. This is usually mandated by the policy language itself or case law or statutes in the jurisdiction where the insured resides or does business.

In other words, liability insurance does not protect against liability resulting from crimes or intentional torts committed by the insured. This is intended to prevent criminals, particularly organised crime, from obtaining liability insurance to cover the costs of defending themselves in criminal actions brought by the state or civil actions brought by their victims. A contrary rule would encourage the commission of crime, and allow insurance companies to indirectly profit from it by allowing criminals to insure themselves from adverse consequences of their own actions.

Crime is not uninsurable per se. In contrast to liability insurance, it is possible to obtain loss insurance to compensate for one's losses as the victim of a crime.

== Evidentiary rules ==
In the United States, most states make only the carrying of motor vehicle insurance mandatory. Where the carrying of a policy is not mandatory and a third party makes a claim for injuries suffered, evidence that a party has liability insurance is generally inadmissible in a lawsuit on public policy grounds, because the courts do not want to discourage parties from carrying such insurance. There are two exceptions to this rule:

1. If the owner of the insurance policy disputes ownership or control of the property, evidence of liability insurance can be introduced to show that it is likely that the owner of the policy probably does own or control the property.
2. If a witness has an interest in the policy that gives the witness a motive or bias regarding specific testimony, the existence of the policy can be introduced to show this motive or bias. Federal Civil Procedure Rule 26 was amended in 1993 to require that any insurance policy that may pay or may reimburse be made available for photocopying by the opposing litigants, although the policies are not normally information given to the jury. Federal Rules of Appellate Procedure rule 46 says that an appeal can be dismissed or affirmed if counsel does not update their notice of appearance to acknowledge insurance. The Cornell University Legal Institute website includes congressional notes.

== In the technology industry ==
“Because technology companies represent a relatively new industry that deals largely with intangible and valuable data, some definitions of legal liability are still evolving in this field. Technology firms must read and understand their policy limits to ensure coverage of all potential risks inherent in their work”.

Professional liability insurance typically protects technology firms from litigation resulting from charges of professional negligence or failure to perform professional duties. Covered incidents may include errors and omissions that result in the loss of client data, software or system failure, claims of non-performance, negligent overselling of services, contents of a forum post or email of an employee that are incorrect or cause harm to a reputation, getting rid of office equipment such as fax machines without properly clearing their internal memory, or failing to notify customers that their private data has been breached. For example, some client companies have won significant settlements after technology subcontractors’ actions resulted in the loss of irreplaceable data. Professional liability insurance generally covers such payments and legal defense within policy limits.

Additionally, client contracts often require on-site technology subcontractors to provide proof of general liability and professional liability insurance.

== See also ==
- Cumis counsel
- Decennial liability
- Professional liability insurance
