= Attorneys in the United States =

An attorney at law in the United States is a practitioner in a court of law who is legally qualified to prosecute and defend actions in court on the retainer of clients. As of January 1, 2024, there were 1,322,649 active lawyers in the United States. In terms of absolute numbers, the American legal profession was the largest in the world as of 2015, and it is thought to be the largest in the world in proportion to domestic population. A 2012 survey conducted by LexisNexis Martindale-Hubbell determined 58 million consumers in the U.S. sought an attorney in the last year and that 76 percent of consumers used the Internet to search for an attorney.

The United States legal system does not draw a distinction between lawyers who plead in court and those who do not, unlike some other common law jurisdictions. For example, jurisdictions in the United Kingdom distinguish between solicitors, who do not plead in court, and barristers, who do. Likewise, civil law jurisdictions distinguish between advocates and civil law notaries. An additional factor that differentiates the American legal system from other countries is that there is no delegation of routine work to notaries public.

Attorneys may be addressed by the post-nominal letters Esq., the abbreviated form of the word Esquire.

== Specialization ==
Many American attorneys limit their practices to specialized fields of law. Often distinctions are drawn between different types of attorneys, but, with the exception of patent law practice, these are neither fixed nor formal lines. Attorneys can be both outside or in-house counsel; doing plaintiff or defendant representation; having transactional or litigation practice; and having trial or appellate litigation specialties.

Despite these descriptions, some states forbid or discourage claims of specialization in particular areas of law unless the attorney has been certified by their state bar or state board of legal specialization.

Some states grant formal certifications recognizing specialties. In California, for example, bar certification is offered in family law, appellate practice, criminal law, bankruptcy, estate planning, immigration, taxation and workers' compensation. Any attorney meeting the bar requirements in one of these fields may represent themselves as a specialist. The State Bar of Texas, for example, formally grants certification of specialization in 21 select areas of law.

The majority of lawyers practicing in a particular field may typically not be certified as specialists in that field (and state board certification is not generally required to practice law in any field). For example, the State Bar of Texas (as of mid-2006) reported 77,056 persons licensed as attorneys in that state (excluding inactive members of the Bar), while the Texas Board of Legal Specialization reported, at about the same time, only 8,303 Texas attorneys who were board certified in any specialty. Indeed, of the 8,303 certified specialists in Texas, the highest number of attorneys certified in one specific field at that time was 1,775 (in personal injury trial law).

Specialization in patent law is administered by the Office of Enrollment and Discipline of the US Patent and Trademark Office, which imposes stringent requirements for applicants to become registered as patent attorneys or patent agents.

== Training and accreditation ==
In the United States, the practice of law is conditioned upon admission to practice of law, and specifically admission to the bar of a particular state or other territorial jurisdiction. Regulation of the practice of law is left to the individual states, and their definitions vary. Arguing cases in the federal courts requires separate admission.

=== Bar examinations ===
Each US state and similar jurisdiction (e.g. territories under federal control) sets its own rules for bar admission, which can lead to different admission standards among states. In most cases, a person who is admitted to the bar is thereby a member of the particular bar.

In the canonical case, lawyers seeking admission must earn a Juris Doctor degree from a law school approved by the jurisdiction, and then pass a bar exam administered by it. Typically, there is also a character and fitness evaluation, which includes a background check. However, there are exceptions to each of these requirements.

A lawyer who is admitted in one state is not automatically allowed to practice in any other. Some states have reciprocal agreements that allow attorneys from other states to practice without sitting for another full bar exam; such agreements differ significantly among the states.

In 1763, Delaware created the first bar exam with other American colonies soon following suit.

The bar examination in most U.S. states and territories is at least two days long (a few states have three-day exams). It consists of essay questions, usually testing knowledge of the state's own law. Some jurisdictions choose to use the Multistate Essay Examination (MEE), drafted by the NCBE since 1988, for this purpose. Others may draft their own questions with this goal in mind, while some states both draft their own questions and use the MEE. Some jurisdictions administer questions that specifically test knowledge of that state's law.

Bar exams also usually consist of the Multistate Bar Examination, which is a multiple-choice standardized test created and sold to participating state bar examiners by the National Conference of Bar Examiners since 1972. The MBE contains 200 questions which test six subjects based upon principles of common law and Article 2 of the Uniform Commercial Code.

The State of Washington has a separate Law Clerk program under Rule Six of the Washington Court Admission to Practice Rules. A college graduate of good moral character may be accepted into the four-year Rule Six Law Clerk Program, obtain employment in a law firm or with a judge for at least 30 hours a week and study a prescribed Course of Study under a tutor. After successful completion of the program, a law clerk may take the Washington State Bar Exam and, upon passing, will be admitted as an attorney into the Washington State Bar Association.

=== Degrees in law ===
The degree earned by prospective attorneys in the United States is generally a Juris Doctor (Latin for "Doctor of Jurisprudence"; abbreviated J.D.).

The highest law degrees obtainable in the United States are Doctor of Juridical Science (Scientiae Juridicae Doctor, abbreviated S.J.D. or J.S.D.). The S.J.D. is akin to an academic degree that, like the Ph.D., is research-based and requires a dissertation (an original contribution to the academic study of law).

The LL.M. is generally earned by completing studies in a particular area of law. LL.M. is an abbreviation of the Latin, Legum Magister, which means Master of Laws. After earning a J.D., an attorney may seek admission to an LL.M. program. There is no requirement for attorneys to complete an LL.M. program to practice law in the United States, and relatively few attorneys hold an LL.M. In the U.S., for example, some states allow foreign lawyers to seek admission to the bar upon completion of an LL.M., while in other states, a J.D. is required.

=== Law students in court ===
Some courts allow law students to act as "certified student attorneys" after the satisfactory completion of their first year of law school and the completion of particular second- and third-year courses with subjects such as evidence.

Many states allow students to argue in front of a court as a certified legal intern (CLI), provided they meet certain prerequisites, such as having completed at least half of their law education, having taken or be taking the law school's ethics class and being under the supervision of a qualified and licensed attorney.

=== Unlicensed practice of law ===
Some states provide criminal penalties for falsely holding oneself out to the public as an attorney at law and the unauthorized practice of law by a non-attorney.

An attorney at law or lawyer must be an individual admitted to a state bar and licensed by a state, not just a person with a professional law degree.

A few areas of law, such as patent law, bankruptcy, or immigration law, are mandated by the U.S. Constitution to be strictly under federal jurisdiction. In this case, state courts and bar associations are not allowed to restrict the practice of that field of law.

== See also ==
- Contract attorney
- Post-law school employment in the United States
