= Duty =

Commitment or expectation to act

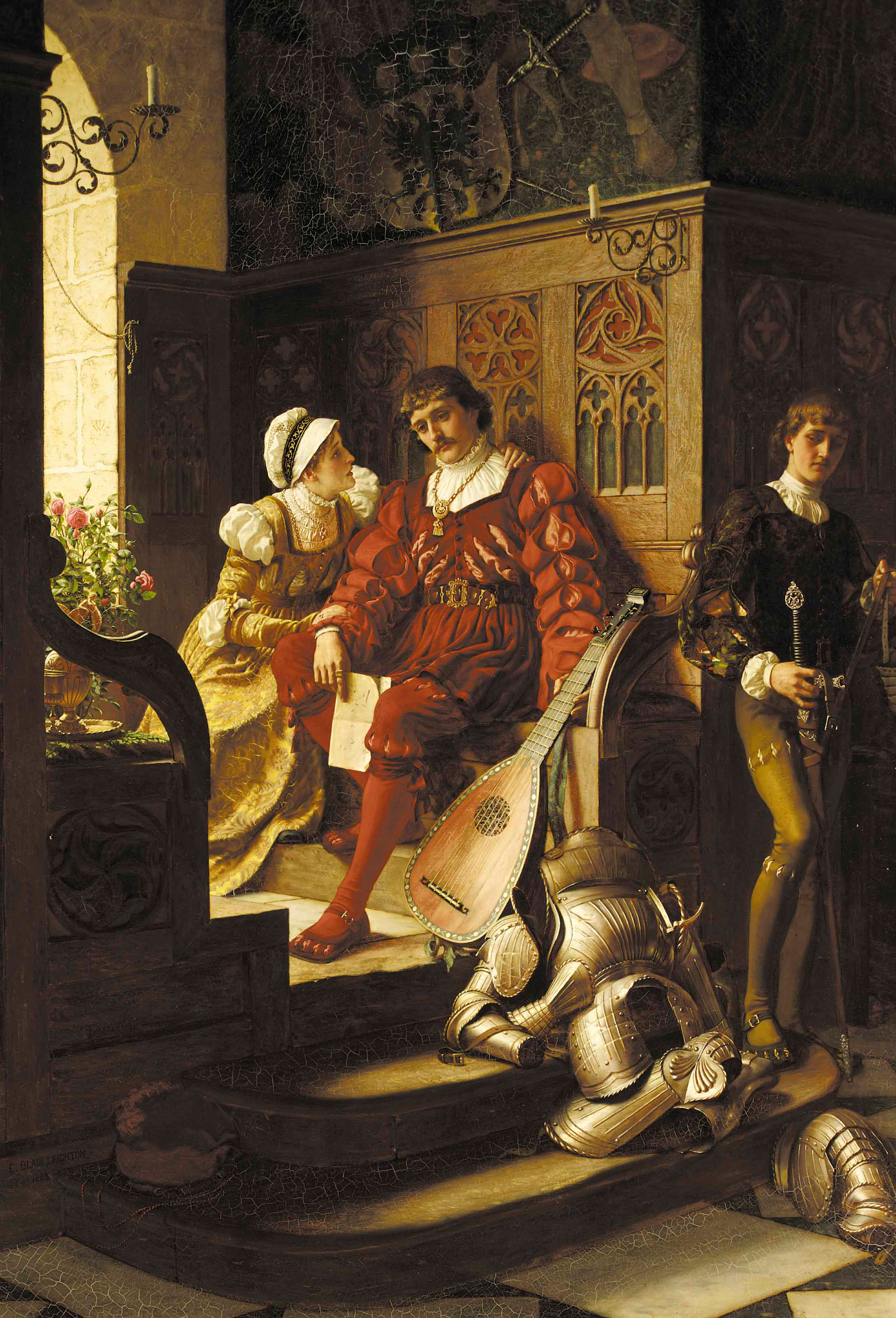
"Duty" by Edmund Leighton

A duty (from "due" meaning "that which is owing"; Old French: deu, did, past participle of devoir; Latin: debere, debitum, whence "debt") is a commitment or expectation to perform some action in general or if certain circumstances arise. A duty may arise from a system of ethics or morality, especially in an honor culture. Many duties are created by law, sometimes including a codified punishment or liability for non-performance. Performing one's duty may require some sacrifice of self-interest.

A sense-of-duty is also a virtue or personality trait that characterizes someone who is diligent about fulfilling individual duties or who confidently knows their calling. A sense-of-duty can also come from a need to fulfill familial pressures and desires. This is typically seen in a militaristic or patriotic way. A distinction is commonly made between "positive duties", which a person must undertake, and "negative duties", which relate to actions from which a person must refrain. Michael Freeman notes that negative duties may be easier to fulfill as they do not require any action.

Cicero, an early Roman philosopher who discusses duty in his work "On Duties", suggests that duties can come from four different sources:

1. as a result of being a human
2. as a result of one's particular place in life (one's family, one's country, one's job)
3. as a result of one's character
4. as a result of one's own moral expectations for oneself.

The specific duties imposed by law or culture vary considerably, depending on jurisdiction, religion, and social normalities.

== Civic duty ==
Duty is also often perceived as something owed to one's country (patriotism), or to one's homeland or community. Civic duties could include:

- Obey the law
- Pay taxes
- Provide for a common defense, should the need arise
- Enroll to vote, and vote at all elections and referendums (unless there is a reasonable excuse such as a religious objection, being overseas, or illness on polling day)
- Serve on a jury, if called upon
- Go to the aid of victims of accidents and street crime and testifying as a witness later in court
- Report contagious illnesses or pestilence to public-health authorities
- Volunteer for public services (e.g. life-saving drills)
- Donate blood periodically or when needed
- Give time to voice advice on a relevant field of expertise, benefits, workplace improvements and on how it is conducted or run
- Revolt against an unjust government

== Duties of employment ==
Specific obligations arise in the services performed by a minister of a church, by a soldier, or by any employee or servant.

Examples:

- Dereliction of duty is an offense in U.S. military law
- Duty to protect, in medicine
- In loco parentis, for schools
- Professional responsibility for lawyers and accountants

== Legal duties ==
Examples of legal duties include:

- Duty of care
- Duty of candour
- Duty to defend and duty to settle, in insurance
- Duty to pay tax (for instance: import duty)
- Duty to rescue
- Duty to retreat
- Duty to report a felony
- Duty to vote (in countries with mandatory voting)
- Duty to warn
- Fiduciary duties
- Duty to care for children as legal guardian (opposite of child neglect)
- Special duties created by a contract
- In loco parentis (duty like a parent to child towards nonhuman entities, such as animals, river, environment, etc. e.g. by treating them as legal person.

== Filial duty ==
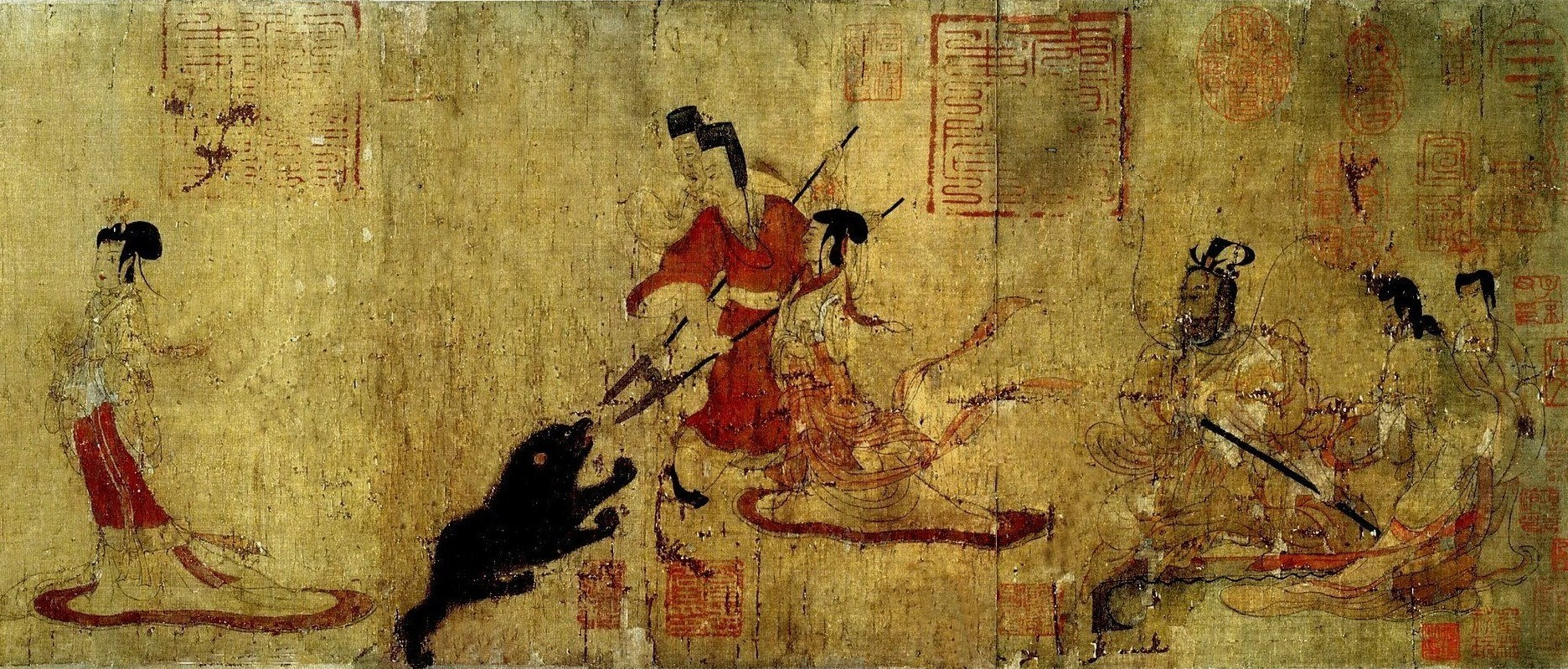
Lady Feng and the Bear

In most cultures, children are expected to take on duties in relation to their families. This may take the form of behaving in such a way that upholds the family's honor in the eyes of the community, entering into arranged marriages that benefit the family's status, or caring for ailing relatives.

This family-oriented sense of duty is a particularly central aspect to the teachings of Confucius, and is known as xiao, or filial piety. As such, the duties of filial piety have played an enormous role in the lives of people in eastern Asia for centuries. For example, the painting Lady Feng and the Bear, from ancient China, depicts the heroic act of a consort of the emperor placing herself between her husband and a rampaging bear. This is meant to be taken as an example of admirable filial behavior.

Filial piety is considered so important that in some cases, it outweighs other cardinal virtues: In a modern example, "concerns with filial piety of the same general sort that motivate women to engage in factory work in Korea, Japan, Taiwan, Malaysia, Singapore, Indonesia, and elsewhere in Asia are commonly cited by Thai prostitutes as one of their primary rationales for working in the skin trade". The importance of filial piety can be expressed in this quote from the Analects of Confucius: "Yu Tzu said, 'It is rare for a man whose character is such that he is good as a son and obedient as a young man to have the inclination to transgress against his superiors; it is unheard of for one who has no such inclination to be inclined to start a rebellion. The gentleman devotes his efforts to the roots, for once the roots are established, the Way will grow there from. Being good as a son and obedient as a young man is, perhaps, the root of a man's character'".

== In various cultures ==
Duty varies between different cultures and continents. Duty in Asia and Latin America is commonly more heavily weighted than in Western culture. According to a study done on attitudes toward family obligation:

Asian and Latin American adolescents possessed stronger values and greater expectations regarding their duty to assist, respect, and support their families than their peers with European backgrounds.

The deeply rooted tradition of duty among both Asian and Latin American cultures contributes to much of the strong sense of duty that exists in comparison to western cultures. Michael Peletz discusses the concept of duty in his book Gender, Sexuality, and Body Politics in Modern Asia:

Notions of filial duty … are commonly invoked to mobilize the loyalties, labor power, and other resources children in the ostensible interests of the household and, in some cases, those of the lineage clan as a whole. Doctrines of filial piety … attuned to them may thus be a source of great comfort and solace to the elders but they can also be experienced as stressful, repressive, or both by those who are enjoined to honor their parents’ (and grandparents’) wishes and unspoken expectations.

An arranged marriage is an example of an expected duty in Asia and the Middle East. In an arranged marriage relating to duty, it is expected that the wife will move in with the husband's family and household to raise their children. Patrilocal residence is usual; rarely does the man move in with the woman, or is the married couple allowed to start their own household and life somewhere else. They need to provide for the entire family in labor and care for the farms and family. Older generations rely on help from their children's and grandchildren's families. This form of duty is in response to keeping the lineage of a family intact and obliging to the needs of elders.

== Philosophical perspectives ==
=== Epictetus ===
In his Discourses, Epictetus employs the analogy of the human foot to elucidate the moral significance of duty: "Do you not know, that as a foot is no longer a foot if it is detached from the body, so you are no longer a man if you are separated from other men." Just as a human foot may sometimes get dirty or pierced by thorns in service to the body, individuals must also fulfil their roles, even if it entails facing sickness, perilous journeys, or premature death. Epictetus states, "It is your duty then, since you are come here, to say what you ought, to arrange these things as it is fit."

=== Marcus Aurelius ===
Marcus Aurelius extensively discusses duty in his Meditations, in a way that can be summarised using a key section from Book VIII:

It is thy duty to order thy life well in every single act; and if every act does its duty, as far as is possible, be content; and no one is able to hinder thee so that each act shall not do its duty.- But something external will stand in the way.- Nothing will stand in the way of thy acting justly and soberly and considerately.- But perhaps some other active power will be hindered.- Well, but by acquiescing in the hindrance and by being content to transfer thy efforts to that which is allowed, another opportunity of action is immediately put before thee in place of that which was hindered, and one which will adapt itself to this ordering of which we are speaking.

Similar to Epictetus, he emphasises the importance of duty for humans beings in their social dimension, but goes further by grounding duty in rationality. Marcus traces the origins of social obligation through a logical progression, viewing duty as stemming from the shared human capacity to reason: "which commands us what to do, and what not to do; if this is so, we are fellow-citizens; if this is so, we are members of some political community." This connection between reason and duty is highlighted too in Book VI, where he states: "I do my duty: other things trouble me not; for they are either things without life, or things without reason, or things that have rambled and know not the way."

In fact, earlier in the Meditations, Marcus expresses concern about the decline of cognitive abilities with age as it affects the fulfilment of duty, noting that "the conception of things and the understanding of them cease first," which weakens "the power of making use of ourselves, and filling up the measure of our duty." He also urges readers to derive their sense of duty from within, rather than from external pressures, encouraging them to "stand erect; not be kept erect by others" and to "Labour not unwillingly, nor without regard to the common interest". Marcus repeatedly comes back to duty as a concept grounded in the human mind, but he does not ignore its social component, advising the reader to accept help, just as a lame soldier ought to when fulfilling his duty to climb the battlements during a siege.

=== Friedrich Nietzsche ===
Friedrich Nietzsche is among the fiercest critics of the concept of duty. "What destroys a man more quickly", he asks, "than to work, think, and feel without inner necessity, without any deep personal desire, without pleasure—as a mere automaton of 'duty'?".

Nietzsche claims that the task of all higher education is "to turn men into machines". The way to turn men into machines is to teach them to tolerate boredom. This is accomplished, Nietzsche says, by means of the concept of duty.

The writings of Arthur Schopenhauer, including On the Basis of Morality, greatly influenced Nietzsche. These influences led Nietzsche to undertake a series of inversions, challenging the idea that morality stemmed from "compassion or sympathy." Instead, Nietzsche asserted that morality was rooted in life's self-overcoming through the will to power. As part of these inversions, Nietzsche explored concepts like "duty" and "pity", previously discussed by Immanuel Kant and Schopenhauer respectively.

=== Ayn Rand ===
Ayn Rand, a youthful admirer of Nietzsche, anchored her morality against Kant's notion of duty. "In a deontological theory, all personal desires are banished from the realm of morality; a personal desire has no moral significance, be it a desire to create or a desire to kill. For example, if a man is not supporting his life from duty, such a morality makes no distinction between supporting it by honest labor or by robbery. If a man wants to be honest, he deserves no moral credit; as Kant would put it, such honesty is 'praiseworthy,' but without 'moral import.'"

== See also ==
- Deontological ethics – Class of ethical theories
- Dharma – Key concept in Indian philosophy and Eastern religions, with multiple meanings
- Filial piety – Virtue and practice in Chinese classics and society at large
- Mitzvah – Precepts and commandments in Judaism
- Morality – Standard, doctrine or system of conduct
