= Contract attorney =

Job career

A contract attorney is a lawyer who works on legal cases on a contract basis. Such work is generally of a temporary nature, often with no guaranteed employment term.

A contract attorney is

An attorney temporarily hired by the law office for a specific job or period. When the job or period is finished, the relationship is over.

— Brent D. Roper

== Civil litigation ==
The work of contract attorneys often varies. They can be engaged activities such as document review in response to a document subpoenas or request for production of documents. In such projects, contract attorneys may review tens of thousands, if not millions, of pages of documents and mark them as responsive to a particular request, or protected as attorney work product or under the attorney–client privilege. Large firms have learned that contract attorneys can perform this work much more cost effectively than high-priced associates.

Many contract, or freelance, attorneys perform legal research, draft legal briefs, and provide a full range of other services to law firms of all sizes. These attorneys typically work for themselves, rather than for temporary agencies, and provide their services to other law firms on an as-needed basis.

Some people who hold juris doctor degrees, but who are awaiting bar admission, work as temporary professionals in law firms doing the same type of work as contract attorneys. In other situations, a law firm may, due to a conflict of interest, be required to hire a contract attorney as Cumis counsel in certain cases.

Contract attorneys typically work on a project-by-project basis and are not full-time law firm employees. However, they also develop long-lasting relationships with firms that regularly or semi-regularly send work to the contract attorney. Many small firms find that the use of contract attorneys provides them the flexibility to grow their business without hiring salaried employees.

According to the American Bar Association, law firms can add a surcharge to the fees of their contract attorneys so long as the final fee charged to the client is reasonable. Particularly in a slowing economy, the use of contract attorneys gives firms a competitive edge in the marketplace, helping them to control costs while increasing profitability.

== Assigned counsel work in criminal defense ==
In counties without a public defender, or without an alternate defender, a contract attorney may be hired to do assigned counsel work. A legal aid group may be hired to do such work as if a temporary work agency, such as the Legal Aid Society of New York City. Other states or counties may have a panel of lawyers who act as contract attorneys. Some critics of this system have accused the method of leading to ineffective assistance of counsel in criminal cases.

== Contract legal assistant ==
A law firm may, under certain circumstances, hire a freelance paralegal, commonly known as a contract legal assistant, to perform many of the tasks that a contract attorney might perform.

== Critique ==
There is criticism of this practice as being harmful to the contract attorneys. According to an article in American Lawyer, a legal temp at a major New York firm reports being 'corralled in a windowless basement room littered with dead cockroaches,' where six out of seven exits were blocked.

== See also ==
- Attorney of record
- Of counsel
