= Víctor Rodríguez =

Víctor Rodríguez may refer to:

== Sports ==
- Víctor Rodríguez (Andorran footballer) (born 1987), Andorran international footballer
- Víctor Rodríguez Andrade (1927–1985), Uruguayan footballer
- Víctor Rodríguez (boxer) (born 1995), Venezuelan boxer
- Victor Rodriguez (soccer) (born 1991), American goalkeeper with the Real Monarchs
- Víctor Rodríguez (Spanish footballer) (born 1989), Spanish footballer
- Víctor Rodríguez (wrestler) (born 1974), Mexican wrestler
- Vic Rodriguez (baseball) (born 1961), American baseball player
- Víctor Rodolfo Rodríguez (1928–2006), Argentinian footballer and coach of Independiente Medellín, All Boys, Racing Club, Huracán and Los Andes

== Others ==
- Víctor Rodríguez Núñez (born 1955), Cuban poet and journalist
- Víctor Rodríguez Párraga (1836–1918), Venezuelan soldier and politician, president in 1899
- Victor A. Rodriguez, American state court judge
- Vic Rodriguez (lawyer) (born 1973), Filipino lawyer
