= Umbrella insurance =

Type of liability insurance

Umbrella insurance is a form of liability insurance that provides coverage when liability exceeds the limits of other insurance policies, such as auto insurance or homeowners insurance. It can also act as primary insurance for losses not covered by those underlying policies, distinguishing it from excess insurance, which typically only extends existing limits. When an insured individual faces liability, their primary policies pay up to their respective limits, and the umbrella policy covers any remaining amount, up to its own limit.

Umbrella insurance is predominantly offered in the United States.

== Excess versus Umbrella ==
While excess insurance similarly pays out after a primary policy’s limit is reached, key differences set it apart from umbrella insurance. Excess insurance typically operates as a "follow-form" policy, mirroring the coverage of the underlying policy and simply adding an additional limit stacked atop the primary one. In contrast, umbrella policies often provide broader protection across one or more primary policies. They lack strict "follow-form" restrictions, may define covered risks more expansively than primary policies, and sometimes omit exclusions found in the underlying coverage. As a result, an umbrella policy can cover certain losses from the first dollar, acting as primary insurance for risks excluded by other policies—a feature known as "dropping down" to fill coverage gaps. This broader scope inspires the "umbrella" name, reflecting its wider protective reach.

== Commercial ==
A commercial umbrella policy may be based on a commercial general liability (CGL) primary policy.

== Personal ==
Personal umbrella policies are typically made excess of a person's homeowner's and automobile insurance. Coverage varies by the company, and detailed comparisons can be constructed showing the differences. Customers are generally high-net-worth individuals, and in the United States, a trade group called the Council for Insuring Private Clients was formed in 2012 to focus on this market. As of 1995, the largest personal insurer in the United States, State Farm Insurance, reportedly had 1.4 million personal umbrella policyholders in the United States, and in 2008 12% of its customers had umbrella coverage.

=== Causes of loss ===
Most personal umbrella losses are related to auto accidents, with a 2013 analysis finding that 78% of claims and 87% of losses related to autos. In a prior 2000-2005 survey, most of the losses were not covered by the underlying policy ("drop-down"), while in 2013 most were in excess of the underlying.

Examples of liability that an umbrella policy may cover when a homeowner's policy doesn't include:

- False arrest
- Invasion of privacy
- Libel
- Slander

== History ==
Umbrella policies began to be sold in 1949 and became popular in the 1960s. Coverage details changed in various ways over the next several decades.
