= Of counsel =

Title of an attorney in the US

Of counsel is the title of an attorney in the legal profession of the United States who often has a relationship with a law firm or an organization but is neither an associate nor partner. Some firms use titles such as "counsel", "special counsel", and "senior counsel" for the same concept. According to American Bar Association Formal Opinion 90-357, the term "of counsel" is used to describe a "close, personal, continuous, and regular relationship" between the firm and counsel lawyer. In large law firms, the title generally denotes a lawyer with the experience of a partner, but who does not carry the same workload or business development responsibility.

== American Bar Association definitions ==
Formal Opinion 90-357 of the American Bar Association provides four acceptable definitions of the term:

- A part-time practitioner who practices law in association with a firm, but on a basis different from that of the mainstream lawyers in the firm. Such part-time practitioners are sometimes lawyers who have decided to change from a full-time practice, either with that firm or with another, to a part-time one, or who have changed careers entirely, as for example former judges or government officials, or attorneys who transition from corporate/in-house practice to law firm practice.
- A retired partner of a firm who, although not actively practicing law, nonetheless remains associated with it and available for occasional consultation
- A lawyer who is, in effect, a probationary partner-to-be, usually brought in laterally with the expectation of becoming partner after a relatively short period of time
- A permanent status in between associate and partner, having the quality of tenure, or something close to it, but lacking an expectation of likely promotion to partner status

== Typical situations ==
The title may be used in a number of situations, including:

- Lawyers who have useful experience for a firm, such as speciality in niche cases, but do not generate enough business to warrant promotion to partnership
- Senior lawyers seeking relatively low working hours, billable hours and revenue generation requirements
- Lawyers transitioning from corporate or government roles

== Other uses ==
Some firms also use the term to refer to attorneys hired on a temporary basis to assist with a particular case. However, because "of counsel" describes "a close, regular, personal relationship", temporary lawyers used by law firms to engage in document reviews for a specific project or for limited duration are not "of counsel".

== Compensation ==
The average annual base salary for "of counsel" or "special counsel" in the United States between 2003 and 2009 was US$216,019 (with salary varying depending on size/reputation of the firm, its location, and the attorney’s experience). As of 2026, an "of counsel" or "special counsel" at most large law firms in the United States make more than US$455,000 per year in base salary with bonuses exceeding $115,000 a year.

== See also ==
- Contract attorney
- Counsel
