= Duty to defend =

The duty to defend is a contractual indemnitor or liability insurer's duty to defend the insured or indemnified party against claims. It is generally broader than the duty to indemnify and may cover defense against claims where ultimately no damage is awarded, and possibly even against claims that would not be covered by the duty to indemnify. It covers both civil suits and alternative dispute resolution procedures. In American courts disputes regarding the application of the duty to defend are generally resolved in the insured's favor.

Under California's Civil Code, in the interpretation of a contract of indemnity, "an indemnity against claims, or demands, or liability, expressly, or in other equivalent terms, embraces the costs of defense against such claims, demands, or liability incurred in good faith" and the person providing the indemnity "is bound, on request of the person indemnified, to defend actions or proceedings brought against the latter in respect to the matters embraced by the indemnity, but the person indemnified has the right to conduct such defenses, if he chooses to do so".
