= White Coat, Black Art =

- Genre: radio documentary, interviews
- Running time: 26:30
- Country of origin: Canada
- Language: English
- Home station: CBLA-FM
- Syndicates: CBC Radio One
- Hosted by: Brian Goldman, M.D.
- Produced by: Jeff Goodes
- Executive producer: Dawna Dingwall
- Website: www.cbc.ca/radio/whitecoat
- Podcast: www.cbc.ca/radio/podcasts/current-affairs-information/white-coat-black-art/

White Coat, Black Art is a Canadian radio documentary series on CBC Radio One, hosted by physician Brian Goldman that examines the business and culture of medicine from an insider's perspective. Its name is a reference to the white coats that doctors wear, and to the ways that practicing medicine is still in some ways a "black art" rather than a science: mysterious, intuitive, and difficult to master.

The series began as a summer series in 2007 and became a regular program on the network's schedule.

The Canadian Medical Association awarded the program the 2011 Media Award for Health Reporting (Excellence in Radio Reporting / In-Depth).
