= California appellate projects =

Non-profit legal corporations

Map of the districts of the California Courts of Appeal.: First District (First District Appellate Project) / Second District (California Appellate Project) / Third District (Central California Appellate Program); Fourth District (Appellate Defenders Inc.) / Fifth District (Central California Appellate Program) / Sixth District (Sixth District Appellate Program)

The California appellate projects are 501(c)(3) non-profit legal corporations under a contract with the California Court of Appeal to provide legal services to indigent parties on appeal from criminal, delinquency, dependency and mental health judgments in their respective district. There are five appellate project corporations, of which the California Appellate Project operates a separate project, the California Appellate Project in San Francisco, to assist in death penalty cases.

The appellate projects are as follows:

- The First District Appellate Project, covering the First District.
- The California Appellate Project, covering the Second District.
- The California Appellate Project in San Francisco, a part of the California Appellate Project, provides assistance to private counsel appointed by the California Supreme Court to represent indigent defendants who have been sentenced to death by a California superior court, and is considered a separate appellate project by the Judicial Council of California.
- The Central California Appellate Program', covering the Third and Fifth Districts.
- Appellate Defenders Inc., covering the Fourth District.
- The Sixth District Appellate Program, covering the Sixth District.
