= California Courts of Appeal =

Intermediate appellate courts of California

Map of the districts of the California Courts of Appeal.: First District / Second District / Third District; Fourth District / Fifth District / Sixth District

The California Courts of Appeal are the state intermediate appellate court system of the U.S. state of California. The state is geographically divided along county lines into six appellate districts. The California Courts of Appeal review appeals from the Superior Courts of California, and any further appeal is to the Supreme Court of California.

The California Courts of Appeal form the largest state-level intermediate appellate court system in the United States, with 106 justices.

== Jurisdiction and responsibility ==
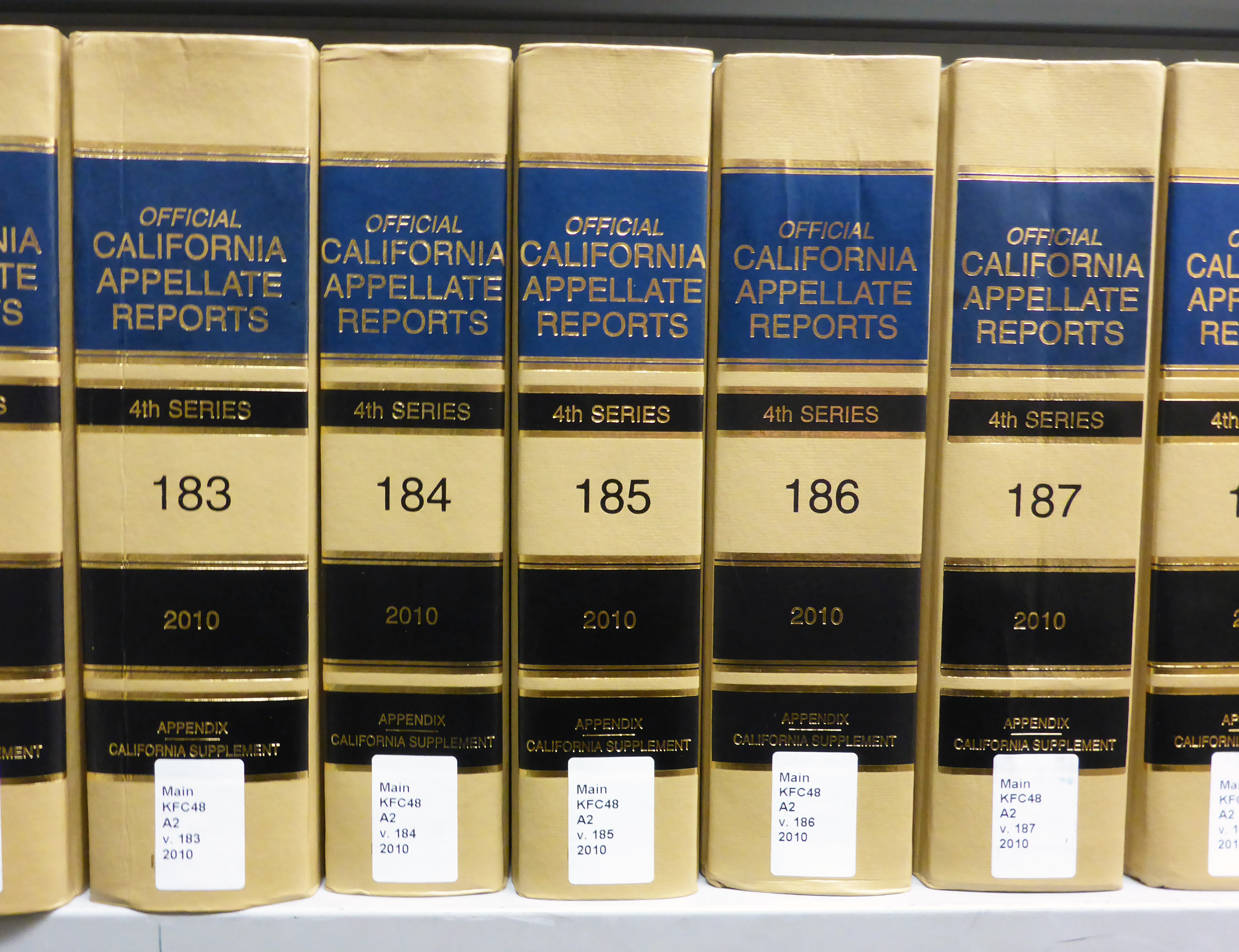
The California Appellate Reports, the court's official reporter

The decisions of the California Courts of Appeal are binding on the Superior Courts of California, and both the Courts of Appeal and the Superior Courts are bound by the decisions of the Supreme Court of California. Notably, all published California appellate decisions are binding on all trial courts. This is distinct from the practice in the federal courts and in other state court systems in which trial courts are bound only by the appellate decisions from the particular circuit in which it sits, as well as the Supreme Court of the United States or the state supreme court. In contrast, "there is no horizontal stare decisis in the California Court of Appeal"; Court of Appeal decisions are not binding between divisions or even between panels of the same division.

Thus, all superior courts (and hence all litigants) are bound by the decision of a Court of Appeal if it is the only published California precedent that articulates a point of law relevant to a particular set of facts, even if the superior court would have decided differently if writing on a fresh slate. However, another Court of Appeal division or district may rule differently on that point of law after a litigant seeks relief from an adverse trial court ruling that faithfully applied existing precedent. In that instance, all superior courts are free to pick and choose which precedent they wish to follow until the state supreme court settles the issue for the entire state, although a superior court confronted with such a conflict will normally follow the view of its own Court of Appeal (if it has already taken a side on the issue).

It is customary in federal courts and other state courts to indicate in case citations the particular circuit or district of an intermediate appellate court that issued the decision cited. But because the decisions of all six California appellate districts are equally binding upon all trial courts, district numbers are traditionally omitted in California citation style unless an actual interdistrict conflict is at issue.

All California appellate courts are required by the California Constitution to decide criminal cases in writing with reasons stated (meaning that even in criminal appeals where the defendant's own lawyer has tacitly conceded that the appeal has no merit, the appellate decision must summarize the facts and law of the case and review possible issues independently before concluding that the appeal is without merit). Such procedure is not mandated for civil cases, but for certain types of civil cases where a liberty interest is implicated, the Courts of Appeal may, but are not required to, follow a similar procedure. Most Court of Appeal opinions are not published and have no precedential value; the opinions that are published are included in the official reporter, California Appellate Reports.

In addition, West Publishing traditionally included Court of Appeal opinions in its unofficial reporter, the Pacific Reporter. In 1959, West began publishing both Supreme Court and Court of Appeal opinions in West's California Reporter, and no longer included Court of Appeal opinions in the Pacific Reporter.

Due to their huge caseloads and volume of output, the Courts of Appeal in turn see the largest number of decisions appealed to the state supreme court and the Supreme Court of the United States. A few famous U.S. Supreme Court cases, such as Burnham v. Superior Court of California, came to the high court on writ of certiorari to one of the Courts of Appeal after the state supreme court had denied review. Many Court of Appeal opinions have become nationally prominent in their own right, such as the 1959 opinion that carved out the first judge-made exception to the at-will employment doctrine, the 1980 opinion that authorized a cause of action for wrongful life, and the 1984 opinion that created the right to Cumis counsel.

== History ==
The California Constitution originally made the state Supreme Court the only appellate court for the whole state. As the state's population skyrocketed during the 19th century, the Supreme Court was expanded from three to seven justices, and then the Court began hearing the majority of appeals in three-justice panels. The Court became so overloaded that it frequently issued summary dispositions in minor cases, meaning that it was merely saying "affirmed" or "reversed" without saying why. The state's second Constitution, enacted in 1879, halted that practice by expressly requiring the Court to issue every dispositive decision in writing "with reasons stated." In 1885, the Legislature authorized the Supreme Court to appoint three commissioners to help with its work, and then authorized two more commissioners in 1889. Despite implementing all these measures, the Supreme Court was no longer able to keep up with the state's rapidly growing appellate caseload by the end of the 19th century. In 1899, the Legislature proposed a constitutional amendment to create what were then called the District Courts of Appeal, but in 1900, only 47 percent of the electorate voted "yes" and the amendment failed to pass. In 1903, the Legislature tried again, and on November 8, 1904, the electorate adopted the amendment with 72 percent voting in favor.

The District Courts of Appeal originally consisted of three appellate districts, headquartered in San Francisco, Los Angeles, and Sacramento, with three justices each. These first nine justices were appointed by Governor George Pardee. Each district was assigned an ordinal number (i.e., first, second, and third). The first nine justices included the five members of the Supreme Court Commission, which had been simultaneously abolished by the same constitutional amendment. The original nine justices of the District Courts of Appeal took office on April 10, 1905. The original terms were staggered, but starting with the 1906 election all justices ran for 12-year terms.

In 1966, the word "District" was dropped from the official names of the Courts of Appeal by another constitutional amendment which extensively revised the sections governing the state judiciary. This left Florida as the sole state in the United States with "District Courts of Appeal." Since then, each of the Courts of Appeal has been named officially as "the Court of Appeal of the State of California" for a particular numbered appellate district.

A serious flaw in the 1904 constitutional amendment is that it authorized the Legislature to create new appellate districts and to add divisions of three justices to existing appellate districts, but it did not authorize the Legislature to add one or two justices at a time to existing divisions. This explains why the First and Second Districts were traditionally expanded by adding more divisions, and then much of the Second District's territory was broken off to form the Fourth and Fifth Districts. The 1966 constitutional amendment authorized the Legislature to create divisions consisting of "a presiding justice and 2 or more associate justices." Relying on the words "or more", the Legislature expanded the existing divisions of the First and Second Districts from three to four justices each, but chose to expand the other appellate districts by adding more justices one by one, rather than more divisions.

== Appointment, retention, and removal ==
Originally, after appointment by the governor, incumbents ran in potentially contested head-to-head elections. However, after a particularly bitter contest in 1932, the California Constitution was amended to provide for the present retention election system, where the voters are given the choice to retain or reject a candidate. To date no incumbent has been denied retention.

To fill a vacant position, the governor must first submit a candidate's name to the Commission on Judicial Nominees Evaluation of the State Bar of California, which prepares and returns a thorough confidential evaluation of the candidate. Next, the governor officially nominates the candidate, who must then be evaluated by the Commission on Judicial Appointments, which consists of the Chief Justice of California, the Attorney General of California, and a senior presiding justice of the Court of Appeal. The Commission holds a public hearing and if satisfied with the nominee's qualifications, confirms the nomination, which enables the nominee to be sworn in and begin serving immediately.

All nominees must have been members of the State Bar of California for at least 10 years preceding their nomination. Typical nominees include experienced attorneys in private practice, current superior court judges, and current federal district judges. Some nominees have taught as adjunct professors or lecturers in law schools, but tenured professors are extremely rare. Another path to the Courts of Appeal is to work for the governor, especially as appointments secretary, cabinet secretary, or legal affairs secretary.

Terms of both Court of Appeal and Supreme Court justices are 12 years. However, if a nominee is confirmed to an existing seat partway through a term, the nominee can only serve the remaining period of the term before standing for election. All California appellate justices must undergo retention elections every 12 years at the same time as the general gubernatorial election, in which the sole question is whether to retain the justice for another 12 years. If a majority votes "no," the seat becomes vacant and may be filled by the governor. While Supreme Court justices are voted on by the entire state, Court of Appeal justices are voted on only by the residents of their districts.

Like all other California judges, Court of Appeal justices are bound by the California Code of Judicial Conduct and can be removed prior to the expiration of their terms by the Commission on Judicial Performance. In order to protect judicial independence (and because the losing party to a lawsuit will almost always regard the judge who ruled against them to be incompetent or biased), the CJP generally only initiates removal proceedings in cases of severe or extensive judicial misconduct.

== Organization ==
Locations of Courts of Appeal courthouses

When there is a vacancy on the Supreme Court of California, or if a Supreme Court justice recuses themself from a case, a Court of Appeal justice is temporarily assigned to hear each Supreme Court case requiring such assignment. When there are vacancies on the Court of Appeal, the Chief Justice of the Supreme Court temporarily assigns a judge from the superior court or a retired justice of the Court of Appeal to sit as a Court of Appeal justice.

Some of the appellate districts (First and Second) are divided into divisions that have four appellate justices, who are randomly selected to form three-justice panels for each appellate case, and whose workloads are divided semi-randomly to ensure even division of work. Some of the appellate districts (Third, Fifth, and Sixth) are not divided into divisions; for each appellate case, three-justice panels are semi-randomly drawn, again to ensure even division of work. The Fourth District is unique in that it is divided into three geographically based divisions that are administratively separate, each of which works much like the Third, Fifth, and Sixth Districts. When the presiding justice of a district or division is part of the three-justice panel, they serve as the presiding justice on the case. When the presiding justice is not part of the three-justice panel, the senior justice of the three-justice panel serves as the acting presiding justice on the case.

The First, Second, and Third Districts each have one big courtroom at their main courthouses which they share with the Supreme Court of California. Therefore, on a typical weekday, the courtrooms of those districts will have three Court of Appeal justices seated at an extra-wide bench large enough to accommodate the seven justices of the Supreme Court.

Unlike the federal courts of appeals, the state Courts of Appeal have no provision allowing rehearing of cases en banc by all justices of a district (or a division in the case of the Fourth District). If a conflict becomes evident between published opinions of different panels or divisions of the same district, and the newer opinion creating the conflict is not immediately appealed to the Supreme Court of California or depublished by that court, the conflict will simply persist until the high court reaches the issue in a future case.

Each court of appeal is led by an administrative presiding justice (APJ). In courts of appeal with divisions, the Chief Justice of California may designate the presiding justice of one division as the APJ, while in courts of appeal without divisions, the presiding justice is also the APJ. As the title implies, the APJ is responsible for managing the court's personnel, operations, caseload, budget, and facilities.

=== First District ===
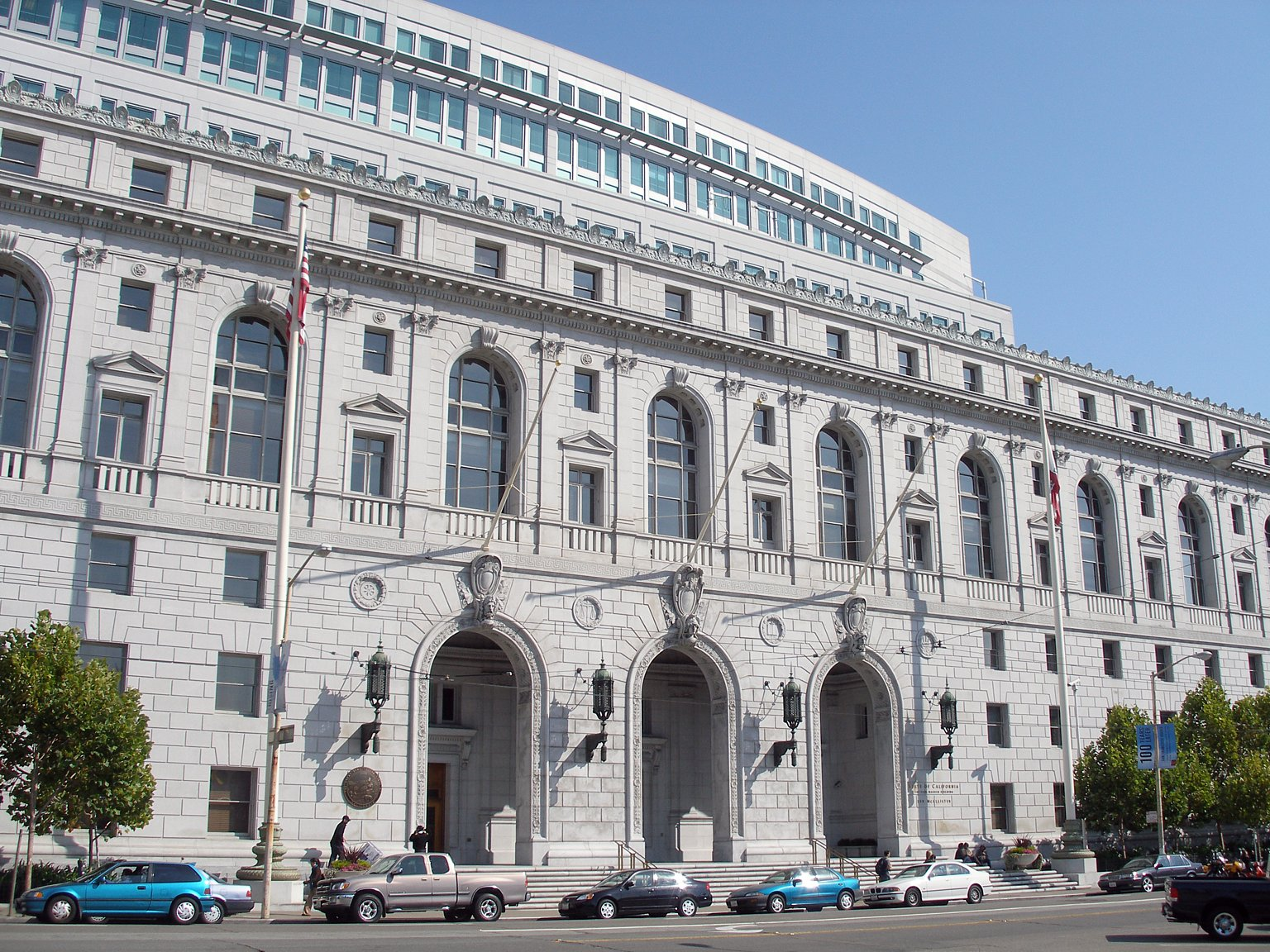
The Supreme Court of California's headquarters is also home to the First District

The California Court of Appeal for the First District is one of the first three appellate districts created in 1904 and is located in San Francisco. Its jurisdiction is over the following counties: Alameda, Contra Costa, Del Norte, Humboldt, Lake, Marin, Mendocino, Napa, San Francisco, San Mateo, Solano, and Sonoma. It is divided into five non-geographical divisions with four justices each:

Division One:

- Jim Humes, Administrative Presiding Justice
- Kathleen M. Banke, Associate Justice
- Monique Langhorne Wilson, Associate Justice
- Charles A. Smiley, Associate Justice

Division Two:

- Therese M. Stewart, Presiding Justice
- James A. Richman, Associate Justice
- Tara M. Desautels, Associate Justice
- Brian Goldman, Associate Justice

Division Three:

- Alison M. Tucher, Presiding Justice
- Carin T. Fujisaki, Associate Justice
- Ioana Petrou, Associate Justice
- Victor A. Rodriguez, Associate Justice

Division Four:

- Tracie L. Brown, Presiding Justice
- Jon B. Streeter, Associate Justice
- Jeremy M. Goldman, Associate Justice
- Adam Hoffman, Associate Justice

Division Five:

- Teri L. Jackson, Presiding Justice
- Mark B. Simons, Associate Justice
- Gordon B. Burns, Associate Justice
- Danny Y. Chou, Associate Justice

==== History ====
In 1905, the first three justices of the First District were Presiding Justice Ralph C. Harrison and Associate Justices James Addison Cooper and Samuel Pike Hall.

The First District Court of Appeal was the first of the District Courts of Appeal to decide a case. On May 22, 1905, the First District affirmed a criminal conviction in People v. Curtis by holding that a charging information for child molestation did not need to expressly plead that the child victim was of the opposite sex than the defendant. The court held that the relevant statute covered acts of child molestation irrespective of the sex of the defendant or the child.

Division Two was added in 1918, followed by Division Three in 1961, Division Four in 1966, and Division Five in 1982. In 1982, the First District lost its southernmost counties to the newly created Sixth District.

=== Second District ===
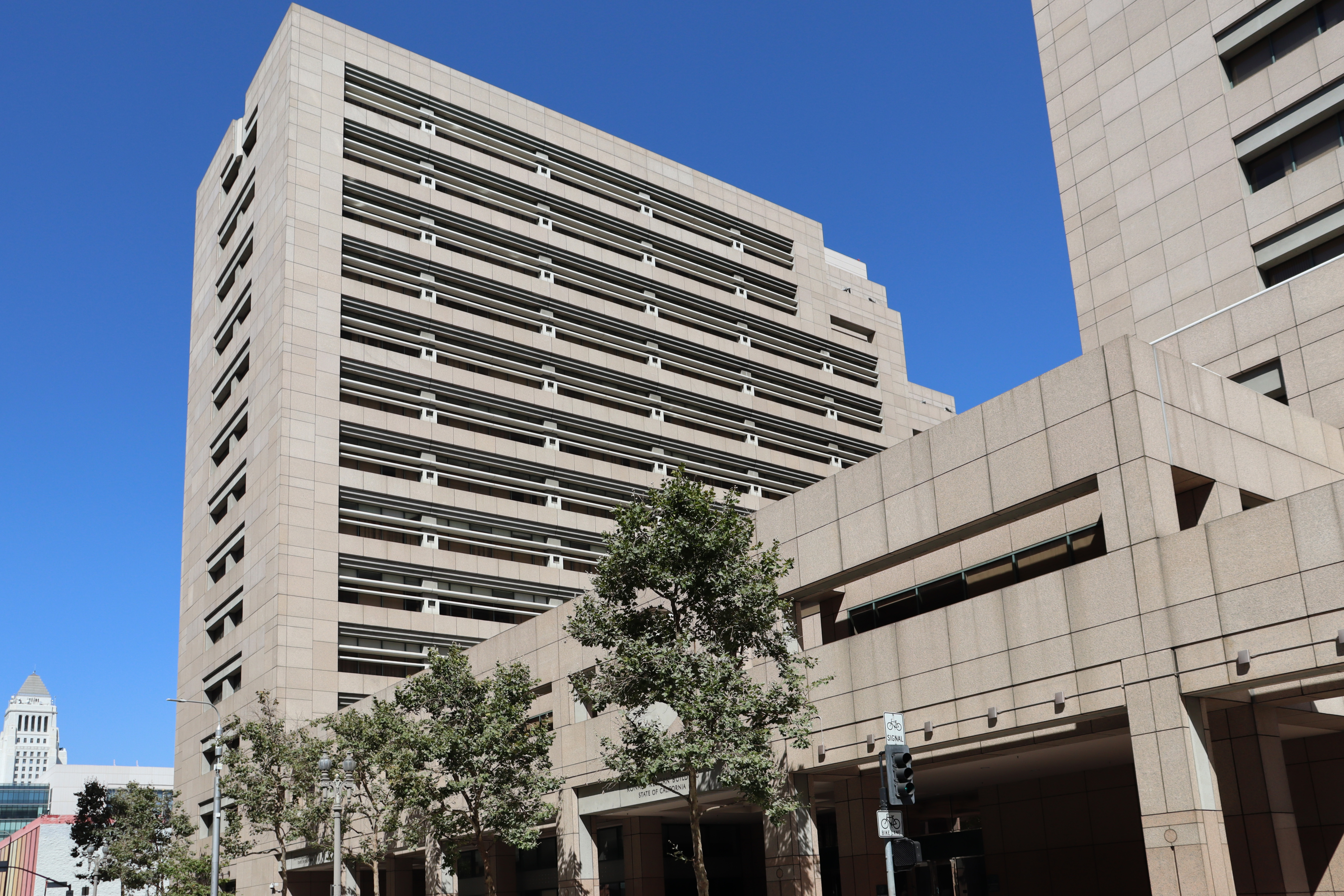
The Second District's main courthouse in Los Angeles, which it shares with the Supreme Court's branch office

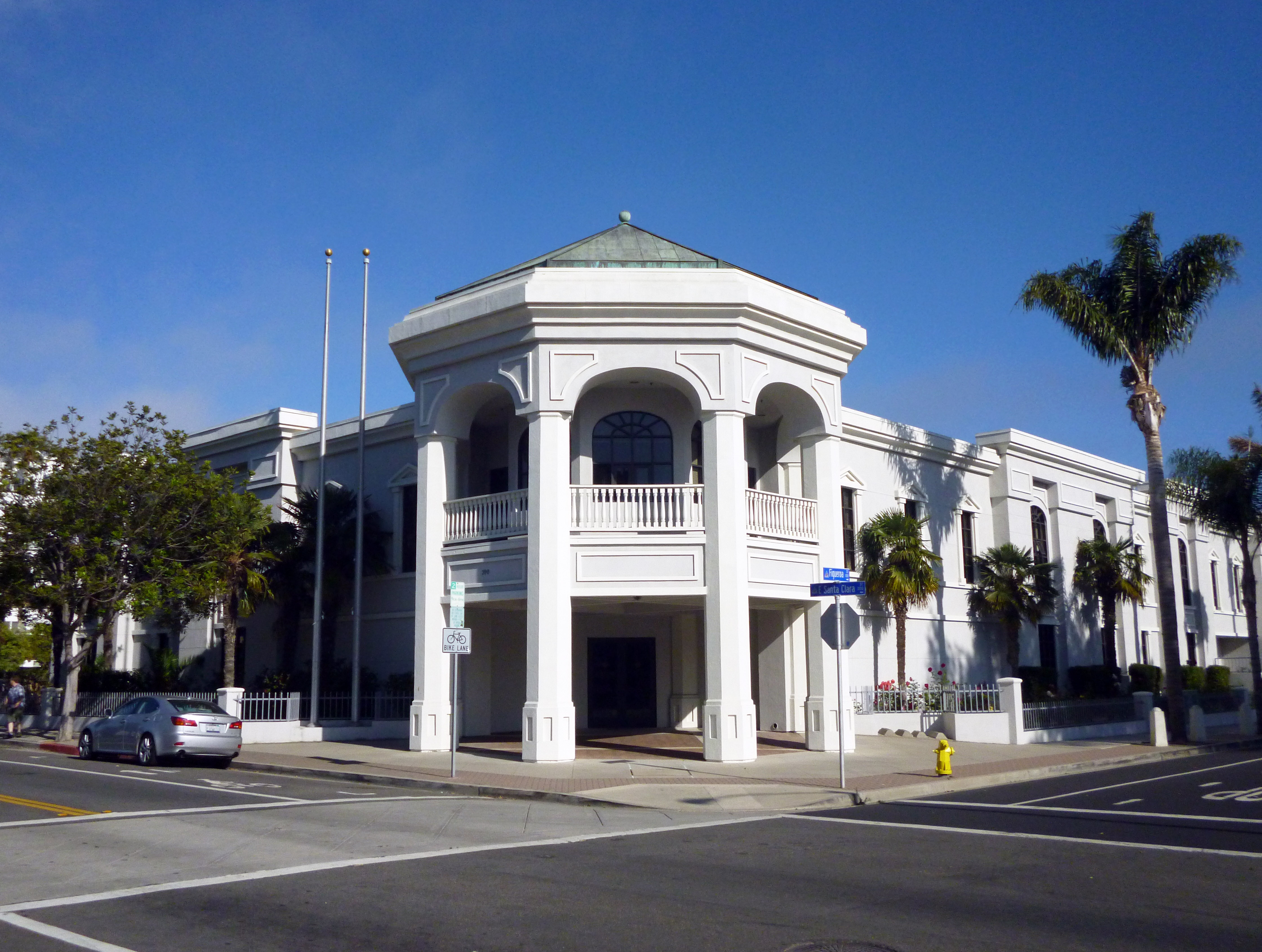
The secondary courthouse in Ventura for Division Six

The California Court of Appeal for the Second District is one of the first three appellate districts created in 1904 and has its main courthouse in Los Angeles and the secondary courthouse, hosting Division Six, in Ventura. Division Six handles appeals from San Luis Obispo, Santa Barbara, and Ventura Counties, while Divisions One through Five, Seven, and Eight handle appeals from Los Angeles County. Each division has four justices.

Division One:

- Frances Rothschild, Presiding Justice
- Helen I. Bendix, Associate Justice
- Gregory J. Weingart, Associate Justice
- Michelle C. Kim, Associate Justice

Division Two:

- Elwood Lui, Administrative Presiding Justice
- Victoria M. Chavez, Associate Justice
- Anne Richardson, Associate Justice
- Stephen Goorvitch, Associate Justice

Division Three:

- Rashida A. Adams, Presiding Justice
- Mark K. Hanasono, Associate Justice
- Cindy Panuco, Associate Justice
- Alexander C.D. Giza, Associate Justice

Division Four:

- Helen Zukin, Presiding Justice
- Audra M. Mori, Associate Justice
- Armen Tamzarian, Associate Justice
- Nicholas F. Daum, Associate Justice

Division Five:

- Brian M. Hoffstadt, Presiding Justice
- Lamar W. Baker, Associate Justice
- Carl H. Moor, Associate Justice
- Dorothy C. Kim, Associate Justice

Division Six:

- Tari L. Cody, Presiding Justice
- Kenneth R. Yegan, Associate Justice
- Hernaldo J. Baltodano, Associate Justice
- Denise Hippach, Associate Justice

Division Seven:

- Gonzalo Martinez, Presiding Justice
- John L. Segal, Associate Justice
- Gail Ruderman Feuer, Associate Justice
- Natalie P. Stone, Associate Justice

Division Eight:

- Maria E. Stratton, Presiding Justice
- John Shepard Wiley, Jr., Associate Justice
- Victor Viramontes, Associate Justice
- Matthew Scherb, Associate Justice

==== History ====
In 1905, the original three justices of the Second District were Presiding Justice Wheaton A. Gray and Associate Justices George Hugh Smith and Matthew Thompson Allen.

The Second District was expanded with the addition of Division Two in 1918, followed by Division Three in 1941, Division Four in 1961, Division Five in 1966, Divisions Six and Seven in 1981, and Division Eight in 2000.

The Second District lost most of its inland counties to the newly created Fourth District in 1929.

=== Third District ===
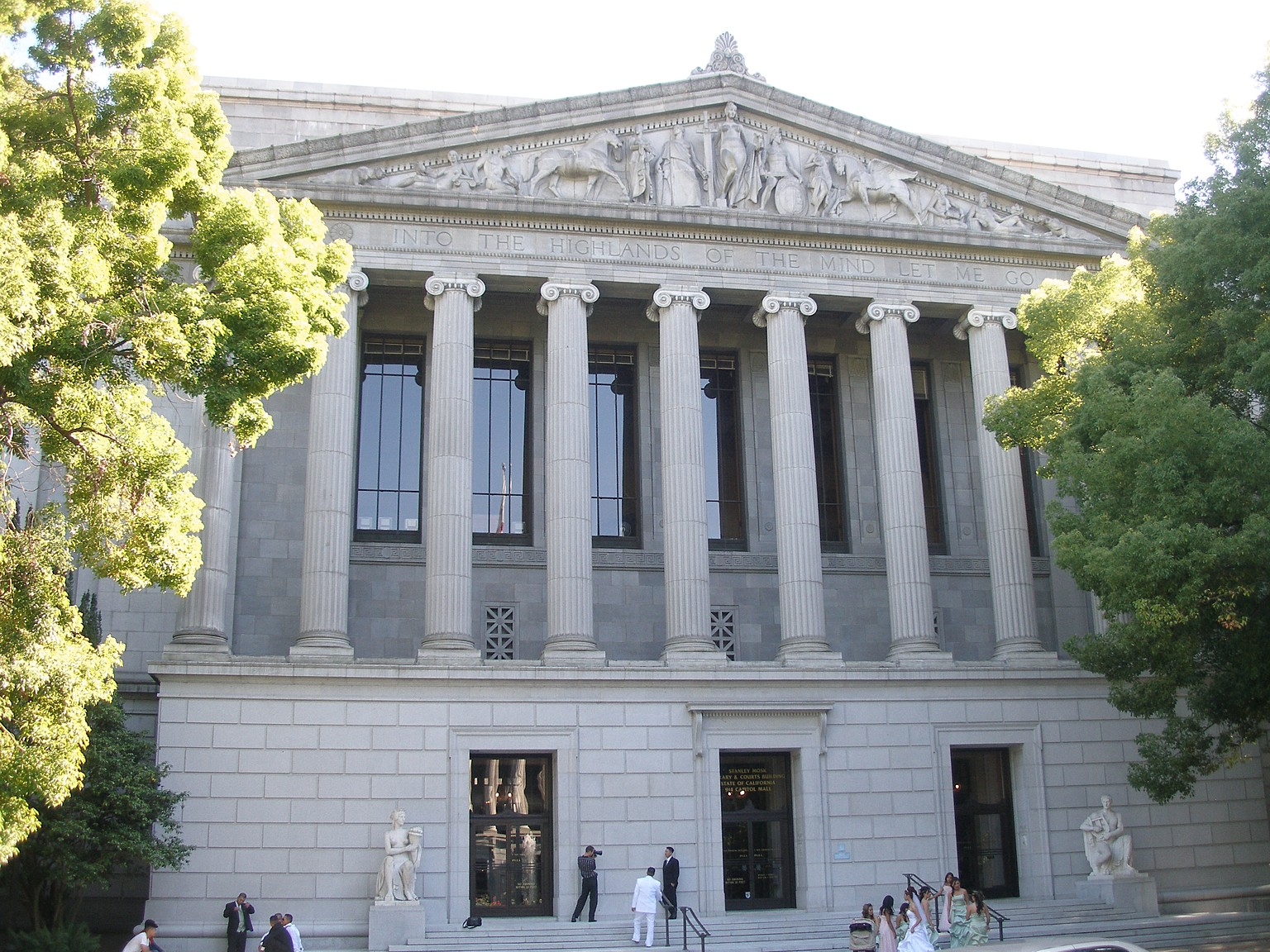
The Third District's courthouse in Sacramento, which it shares with the Supreme Court's branch office

The California Court of Appeal for the Third District is one of the first three appellate districts created in 1904 and is located in Sacramento. Its jurisdiction is over the following counties: Alpine, Amador, Butte, Calaveras, Colusa, El Dorado, Glenn, Lassen, Modoc, Mono, Nevada, Placer, Plumas, Sacramento, San Joaquin, Shasta, Sierra, Siskiyou, Sutter, Tehama, Trinity, Yolo, and Yuba. It has 11 justices and is not divided into divisions.

Justices:

- Laurie M. Earl, Administrative Presiding Justice
- Harry Hull, Associate Justice
- Ronald B. Robie, Associate Justice
- Louis R. Mauro, Associate Justice
- Jonathan K. Renner, Associate Justice
- Peter A. Krause, Associate Justice
- Stacy E. Boulware Eurie, Associate Justice
- Shama Haki Mesiwala, Associate Justice
- Aimee Feinberg, Associate Justice
- Lauri A. Damrell, Associate Justice
- (vacant), Associate Justice

==== History ====
In 1905, the original three justices of the Third District were Presiding Justice Norton P. Chipman and Associate Justices Abram J. Buckles and Charles Emmett McLaughlin.

In 1942, Governor Culbert Olson appointed Annette Abbott Adams as presiding justice of the Third District. This made her both the first woman appointed as a justice of the District Courts of Appeal and the first female presiding justice of a District Court of Appeal. She was also the first woman to sit on the California Supreme Court, when she was appointed to sit pro tempore with the high court for a single case in April 1950.

=== Fourth District ===
The California Court of Appeal for the Fourth District is unique in that it is divided into three geographical divisions that are administratively separate, which even have different case number systems, and yet remain referred to as a single district.

==== Division One ====
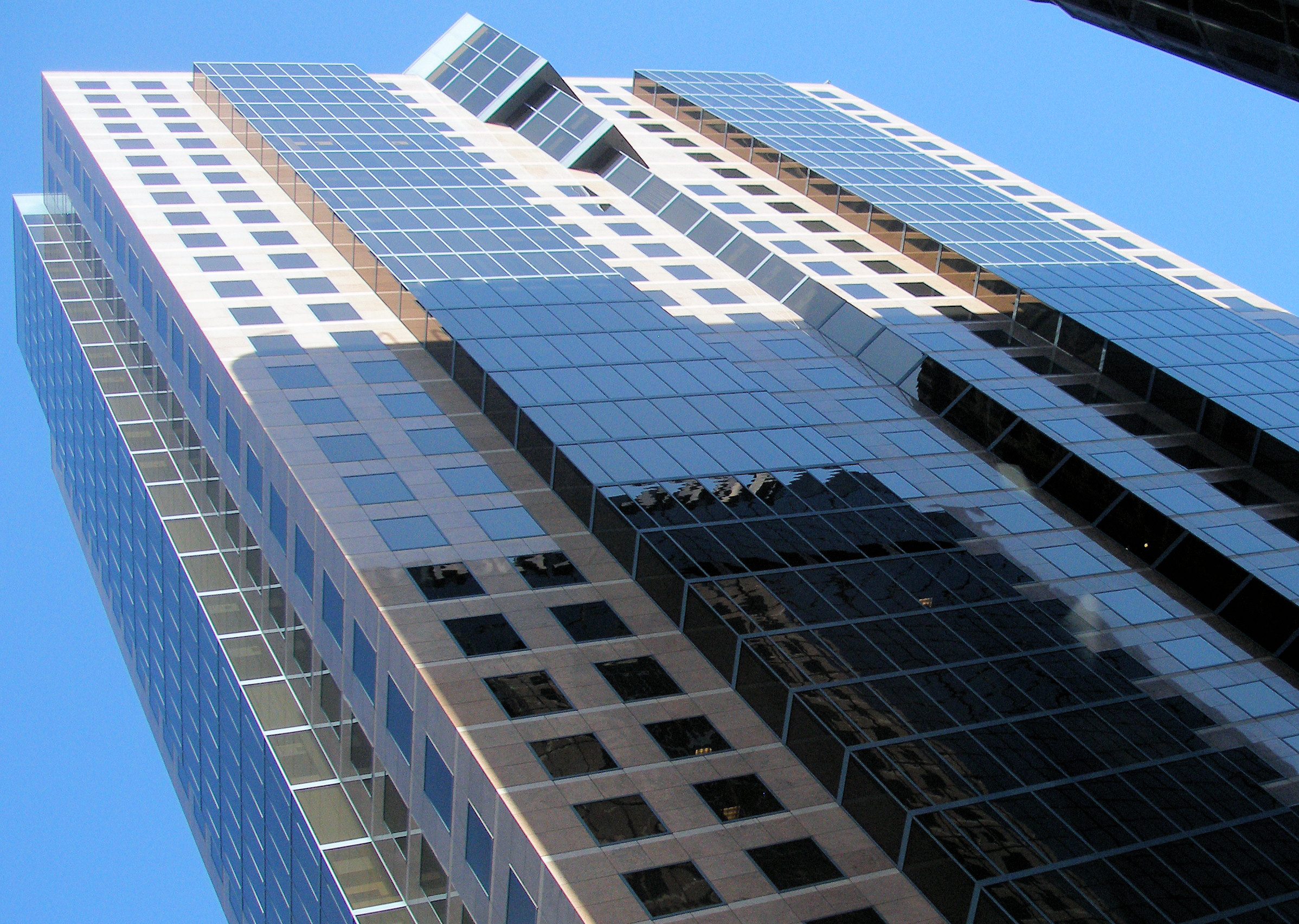
Fourth District, Division One's courthouse at Symphony Towers in San Diego

The Division One courthouse is located in San Diego. It handles appeals from Imperial and San Diego Counties. It has 10 justices.

Justices:

- Judith McConnell, Administrative Presiding Justice
- Terry B. O'Rourke, Associate Justice
- William Dato, Associate Justice
- Truc T. Do, Associate Justice
- Martin N. Buchanan, Associate Justice
- Julia C. Kelety, Associate Justice
- Jose S. Castillo, Associate Justice
- David M. Rubin, Associate Justice
- Eran M. Bermudez, Associate Justice
- Marsha Amin, Associate Justice

==== Division Two ====
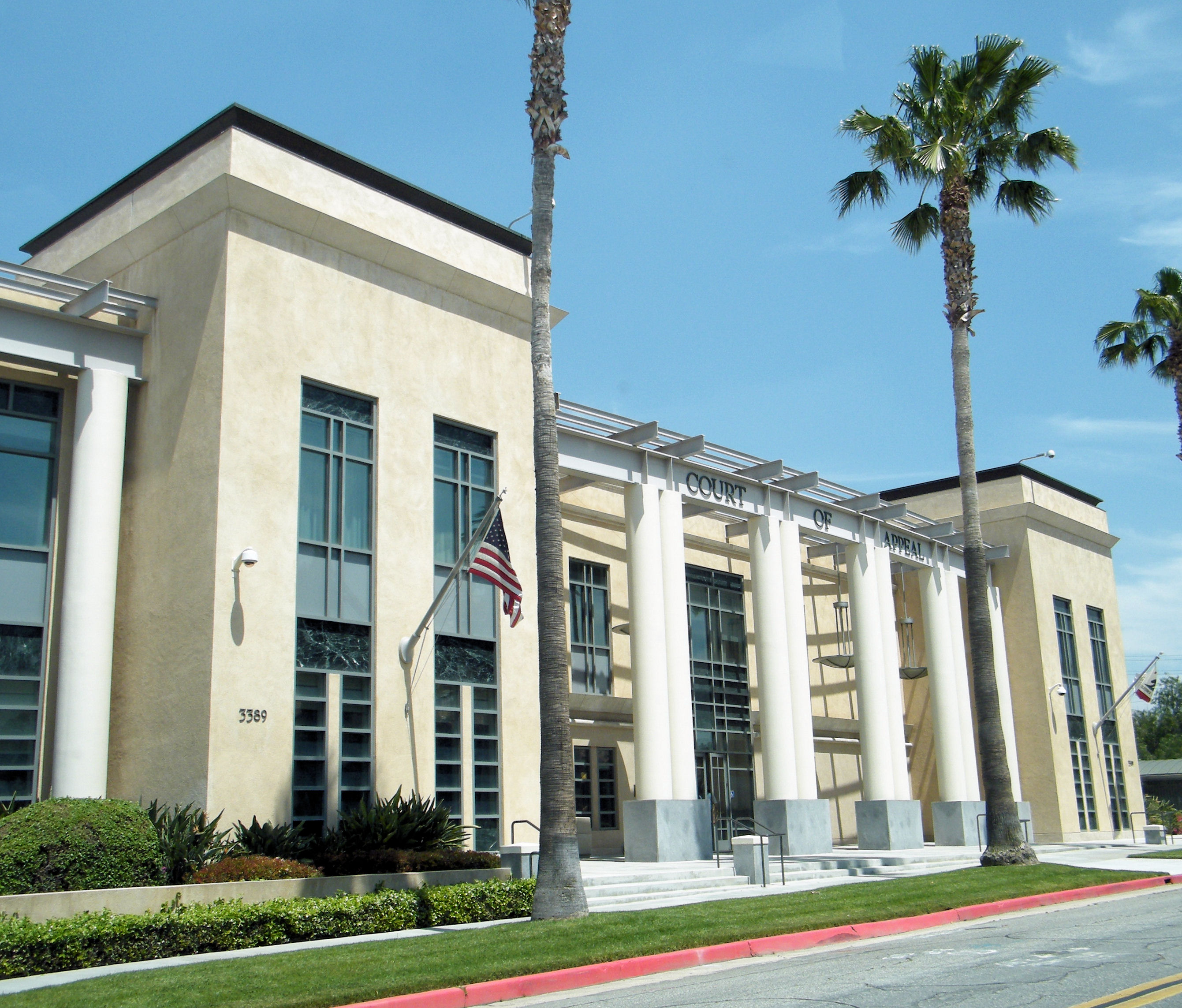
Division Two's Riverside courthouse

The Division Two courthouse is located in Riverside. It handles appeals from Inyo, Riverside, and San Bernardino Counties. It currently has eight justices.

Justices:

- Manuel A. Ramirez, Presiding Justice
- Art W. McKinster, Associate Justice
- Douglas P. Miller, Associate Justice
- Carol D. Codrington, Associate Justice
- Richard T. Fields, Associate Justice
- Michael J. Raphael, Associate Justice
- Frank J. Menetrez, Associate Justice
- Corey Lee, Associate Justice

==== Division Three ====
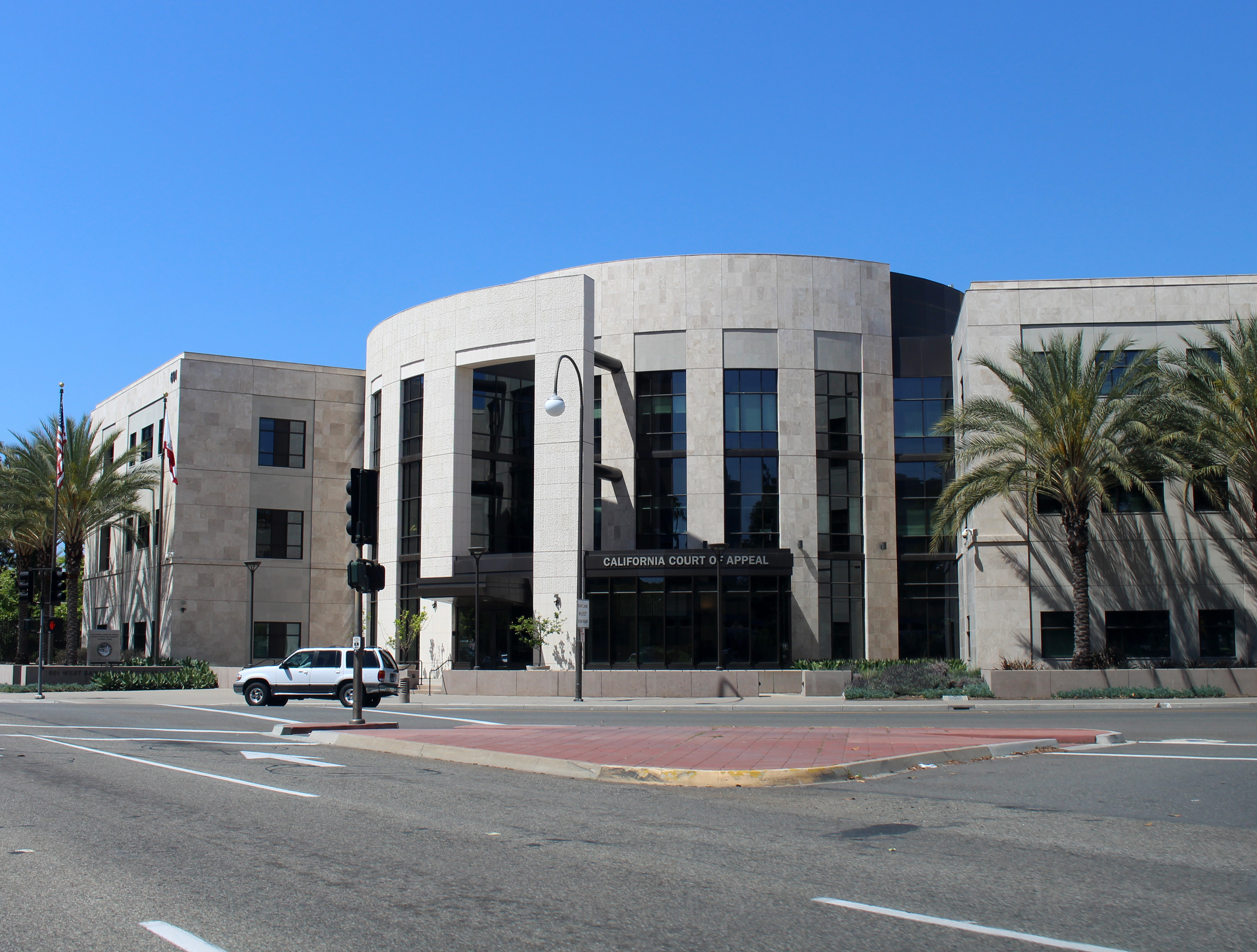
The Division Three courthouse in Santa Ana

The Division Three courthouse is located in Santa Ana. It handles appeals from Orange County. It has eight justices.

Justices:

- Joanne Motoike, Presiding Justice
- Eileen C. Moore, Associate Justice
- Thomas Delaney, Associate Justice
- Martha K. Gooding, Associate Justice
- Nathan Scott, Associate Justice
- Deborah C. Servino, Associate Justice
- Juliet O. McCauley, Associate Justice
- Maria D. Hernandez, Associate Justice

==== History ====
The Fourth District was formed by a division of the Second District pursuant to legislation that was approved on June 5, 1929 and went into effect August 14, 1929. The first decision made by the Fourth District was on October 16, 1929, in the case of Mills v. Mills (1929) 101 Cal.App. 248 [281 P. 707].

Originally, appeals from all of Southern California (including the San Joaquin Valley) were heard by the state supreme court sitting in Los Angeles, and then the Second District took over most of that caseload when it was created in 1904. Lawyers from the rest of Southern California outside of Los Angeles County grew tired of having to travel hundreds of miles to and from Los Angeles just to argue appeals. They lobbied for the creation of a Fourth District that would sit at locations closer to them. Three state senators from San Diego, Fresno, and San Bernardino orchestrated the creation of the Fourth District in 1929. As a compromise, the court was created as a "circuit-riding" court that would sit each year in all three of those cities: Fresno (January–April), San Diego (May–August), and San Bernardino (September–December).

In 1961, the Fifth District, with headquarters in Fresno, was created to hear appeals from San Joaquin Valley counties. The Fourth District's remaining territory was still enormous (San Bernardino County is the single largest county in the contiguous United States by area). In 1965, Division Two was added to the Fourth District and the original three justices became Division One. After three new justices were appointed and Division Two became operational in early 1966, Division One sat permanently in San Diego and Division Two sat permanently in San Bernardino, meaning the Fourth District would no longer be a circuit-riding court. The two divisions shared jurisdiction over Orange County until the creation of Division Three in 1982.

The Fourth District was the first Court of Appeal to get a custom-built courthouse of its own in January 1999, when Division Two moved from San Bernardino to a newly built courthouse in Riverside. The First, Second, and Third Districts have always shared courthouses with the Supreme Court, while the Fourth, Fifth, and Sixth Districts at their founding all initially leased space in existing office buildings.

=== Fifth District ===
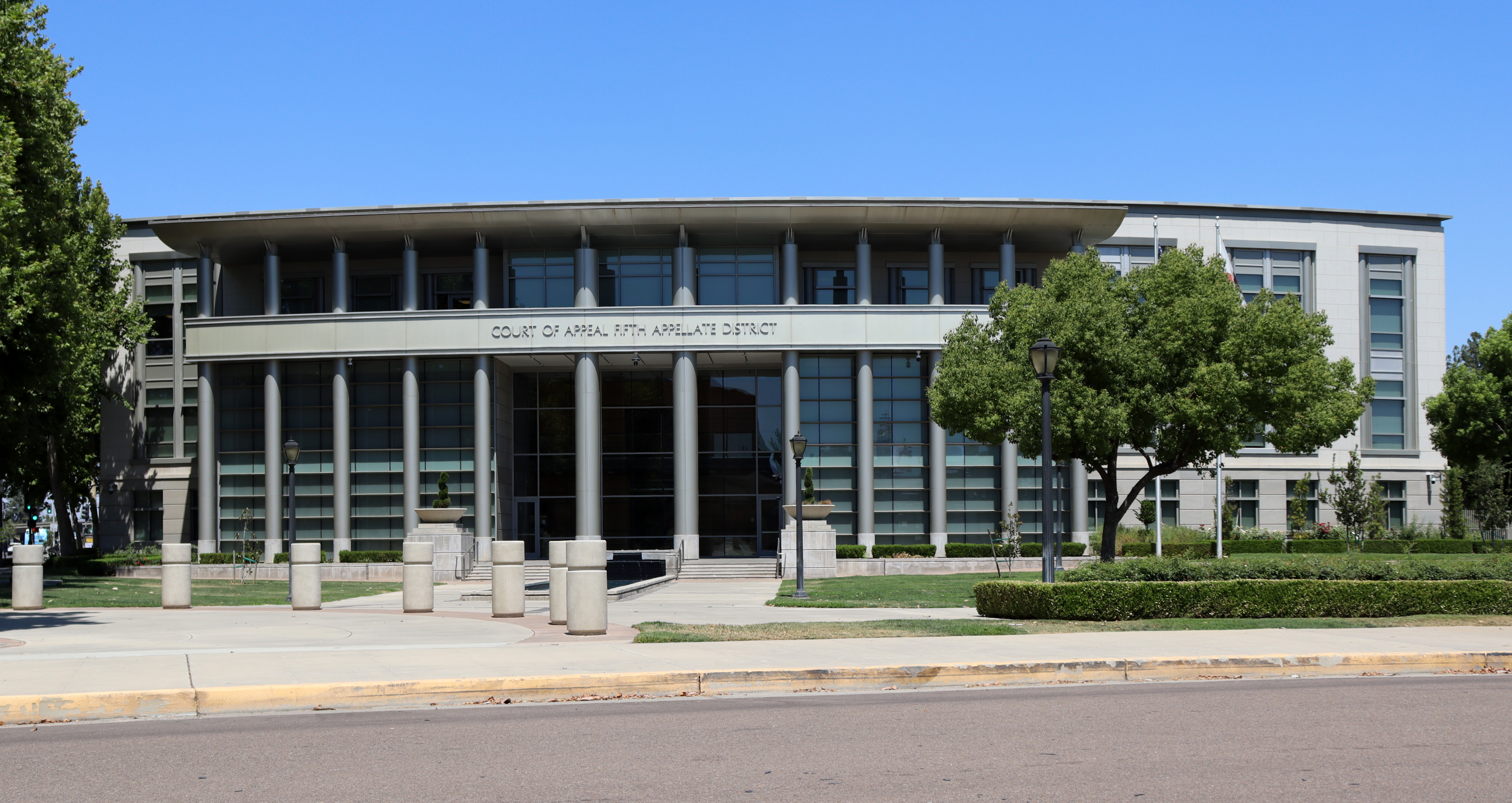
The Fifth District's Fresno courthouse

The California Court of Appeal for the Fifth District is located in Fresno. Its jurisdiction covers the following counties: Fresno, Kern, Kings, Madera, Mariposa, Merced, Stanislaus, Tulare, and Tuolumne. It currently has 10 justices.

Justices:

- Brad R. Hill, Administrative Presiding Justice
- Bert Levy, Associate Justice
- Jennifer R.S. Detjen, Associate Justice
- Donald R. Franson, Jr., Associate Justice
- Kathleen Meehan, Associate Justice
- Mark W. Snauffer, Associate Justice
- Thomas De Santos, Associate Justice
- Arlan L. Harrell, Associate Justice
- Amy K. Guerra, Associate Justice
- Sonny S. Sandhu, Associate Justice

==== History ====
The heavy burden of travel that had led to the birth of the Fourth District also gave birth to the Fifth District, although this time it was the burden on judges and not lawyers that was the problem. The statutory requirement of sitting each year for several months in three different cities quite distant from each other was too disruptive for young men with families whose children needed to be in school, and discouraged them from accepting appointment to the court.

The Fifth District was formed by a division of the Fourth District pursuant to legislation enacted in 1961 (Stats.1961, c. 845, p. 2128, § 7). The first decision made by the Fifth District was on November 21, 1961, in the case of Wheat v. Morse (1961) 17 Cal.Rptr. 226 [197 Cal.App.2d 203].

=== Sixth District ===
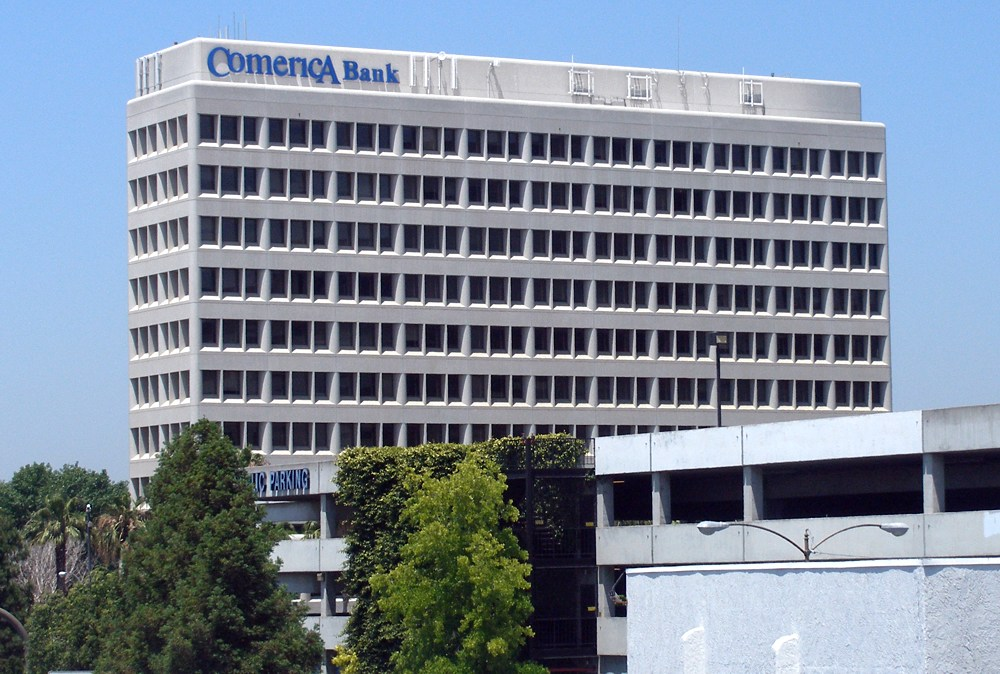
The Comerica Bank Tower, which houses the Sixth District's courthouse

The California Court of Appeal for the Sixth District is located in the Comerica Bank building in San Jose. Its jurisdiction covers Monterey, San Benito, Santa Clara, and Santa Cruz Counties. It has seven justices.

Justices:

- Mary J. Greenwood, Administrative Presiding Justice
- Adrienne M. Grover, Associate Justice
- Allison M. Danner, Associate Justice
- Cynthia C. Lie, Associate Justice
- Charles E. Wilson, Associate Justice
- Daniel Bromberg, Associate Justice
- Charles F. Adams, Associate Justice

==== History ====
During the 1960s and 1970s, the population of Santa Clara County skyrocketed along with the development of Silicon Valley, and it ultimately became and remains the most populous county in Northern California. Just as the Fourth District was born out of exasperation with long drives to Los Angeles, Santa Clara County lawyers started to push for the creation of a new intermediate appellate court to relieve them of long journeys to the First District's courthouse in San Francisco.

The Sixth District was formed by a division of the First District pursuant to legislation enacted in 1981 (Stats.1981, c. 959, p. 3645, § 5). The first decision made by the Sixth District was on December 13, 1984, in the case of People v. Dickens (1984) 163 Cal.App.3d 377 [208 Cal.Rptr. 751].

George Deukmejian was responsible for the long delay between the creation of the court and its first decision. As Attorney General, Deukmejian used his position on the Commission on Judicial Appointments to block outgoing governor Jerry Brown's appointees from taking office. In November 1982, Deukmejian was elected as the next governor of California. He ran for and was elected governor on a "tough on crime" platform in an era when the state was struggling with an extremely high crime rate. To fulfill that promise, he appointed almost 1,000 California judges during his time in office, including 55 justices of the Courts of Appeal (out of a total of 88 seats at the time). He belatedly announced his own appointments to the Sixth District in 1984, and then the new court was finally able to start hearing appeals.

== See also ==
- Judiciary of California
- Supreme Court of California
- Court of Appeals
- Districts in California
- California appellate projects
