= Cumis counsel =

A Cumis counsel is "an attorney employed by a defendant in a lawsuit when there is a liability insurance policy supposedly covering the claim, but there is a conflict of interest between the insurance company and the insured defendant."

== The defining decision ==
The name derives from the case of San Diego Navy Federal Credit Union v. Cumis Insurance Society, Inc., which the California Court of Appeal for the Fourth Appellate District decided on December 3, 1984. While Cumis is the best-known appellate precedent on the issue of the appointment of independent counsel for the defense of insureds when their insurance company has a conflict of interest, Cumis was not the first proponent of this principle. The Supreme Court of California expressed its approval of the concept of independent counsel in an earlier 1964 case, which in turn was based upon a 1925 Kentucky case that laid the foundation for appointing independent counsel in the insurer-insured relationship. Cumis innovated beyond existing precedent as of 1984 by holding that the insurer was required to pay for the insured's independent counsel, and that a merely theoretical conflict of interest could be ripened by the insurer's act of sending a reservation of rights letter into an actual conflict of interest, which in turn meant that the insured now had an enforceable right to independent counsel.

Cumis concluded as follows:

We conclude the Canons of Ethics impose upon lawyers hired by the insurer an obligation to explain to the insured and the insurer the full implications of joint representation in situations where the insurer has reserved its rights to deny coverage. If the insured does not give an informed consent to continued representation, counsel must cease to represent both. Moreover, in the absence of such consent, where there are divergent interests of the insured and the insurer brought about by the insurer's reservation of rights based on possible noncoverage under the insurance policy, the insurer must pay the reasonable cost for hiring independent counsel by the insured. The insurer may not compel the insured to surrender control of the litigation ... Disregarding the common interests of both insured and insurer in finding total nonliability in the third party action, the remaining interests of the two diverge to such an extent as to create an actual, ethical conflict of interest warranting payment for the insureds' independent counsel.

In 1987, the California State Legislature enacted a statute governing the right of insured defendants to independent counsel.

A common conflict of interest arises when the insurance company denies or refuses to defend all or part of a claim under a liability insurance policy, such as when an insurance company pays for the defense of a policyholder under a reservation of rights to dispute coverage.

A law firm can still have a conflict of interest, despite the appointment of a Cumis counsel. However, in some states, the appointment can cure a conflict. The appointment of Cumis counsel also raises unusual attorney–client privilege issues.

== Prior and subsequent developments ==
After a number of pioneering insurance bad faith cases in the 1950s and 1960s, it became common for U.S. insurers to reflexively issue reservation of rights letters in response to practically every tender of a third party claim by an insured. Under those earlier cases, it was held that if an insurer withdrew a defense after failing to reserve their rights, they could be (and were actually often held to be) liable for all damages suffered by the insured, including damages in excess of the policy's limits of coverage. Therefore, insurers wanted to always reserve their right to withdraw if facts were later discovered precluding coverage (e.g., evidence that the insured was guilty of an intentional tort, which is uninsurable).

The Cumis decision changed that practice significantly. Now, in California and several other states, an insurer faced with a new tender has three options: (1) deny the tender completely and either risk an immediate bad faith lawsuit by the insured or having to sue the insured first to obtain a judicial declaration of no coverage (a "race to the courthouse"); (2) accept the tender without a reservation of rights and thereby commit to defending the insured to a final judgment (unless the policy is expressly designed so that defense costs "eat away" at policy limits); or (3) accept the tender but issue a reservation of rights letter, which may cause the insured to promptly exercise his or her right to Cumis counsel if a potential conflict of interest is already clear enough at that point in time under the known facts or allegations and the insurer's letter expressly reserves the right to withdraw from the insured's defense and deny indemnity for that reason. In turn, the third option jacks up the insurer's costs because the insurer now has to pay for independent counsel and counsel of its own to monitor the case at arm's length (so that privileged information never reaches the insurer).

The advantage of the second option is that by assuming complete responsibility for the defense of its insured, the insurer has more control over defense costs. Most insurers operate so-called "captive" law firms (carefully designed to avoid the ban on the corporate practice of law) and also maintain "panels" of preferred defense law firms who agree to carefully negotiated rate structures. In contrast, because independent counsel is separate from the insurer, their billing rates will be somewhat higher since they merely must bill the "reasonable" rate for their defense services. But if the insurer accepts the defense without a reservation of rights, it must defend completely and loses the right to recover the cost of defense from the insured even if it later discovers that the entire claim was uninsurable to begin with.

Because of all these issues, reservation of rights letters are issued today by adjusters only after careful consideration and discussion with experienced insurance coverage counsel.
