= Victor A. Rodriguez =

American judge (born 1974/75)

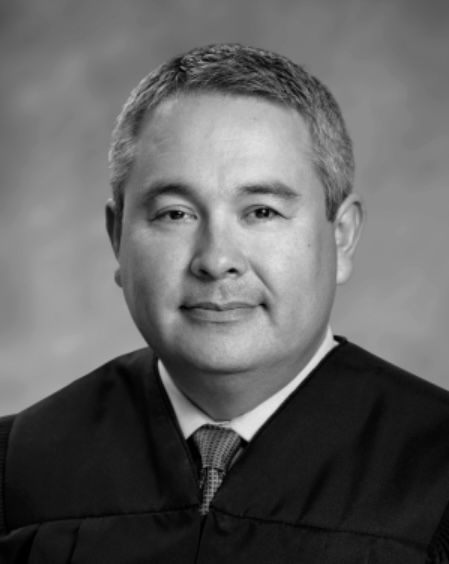

Judge of the California Courts of Appeal
- Incumbent
- Assumed office October 13, 2021
- Appointed by: Gavin Newsom
- Preceded by: Teri L. Jackson

Personal details
- Born: 1974 or 1975 (age 50–51)
- Party: Democratic
- Education: University of California, Berkeley (BA); California State University, Long Beach (MA); University of California, Berkeley School of Law (JD)

Victor A. Rodriguez (born 1974/1975) is an American state court judge who serves as a judge of the California Courts of Appeal for the First Appellate District, Division Three.

== Education ==
Rodríguez earned his Bachelor of Arts from the University of California, Berkeley, Master of Arts from California State University, Long Beach and his Juris Doctor from the University of California, Berkeley School of Law.

== Career ==
From 2005 to 2006, Rodríguez served as a law clerk for Judge Consuelo Bland Marshall at the United States District Court for the Central District of California. Between 2003 and 2005, he was a Skadden Fellow at the Mexican American Legal Defense and Educational Fund (MALDEF). After he completed his fellowship at MALDEF from 2006 to 2015, Rodríguez worked at the Supreme Court of California as a judicial staff attorney for Justices Carlos R. Moreno, Carol Corrigan and Goodwin Liu from 2006 to 2015, and as the supervising staff attorney for Justice Mariano-Florentino Cuéllar from 2015 to 2018. Starting in 2012, Rodriguez served one year as an attorney on the court's Criminal Central Staff. In January 2018, Rodriguez begin serving as a judge on the Alameda County Superior Court, presiding over the civil domestic violence restraining order department and serving as the chair of the court's Family Violence Council and Access Committee. For five months, he was a pro tem justice in Division Five of the Court of Appeal for the First Appellate District. As of 2023, Rodríguez serves as the chair of the Language Access Subcommittee to the Judicial Council's Advisory Committee on Providing Access and Fairness, also serving on the Advisory Committee. He previously served on the Judicial Council's Language Access Plan Implementation Task Force until its completion in March 2019.

On September 3, 2021, Governor Gavin Newsom appointed Rodriguez to the California Courts of Appeal for the First Appellate District, Division Three.

== Personal life ==
Rodríguez and his wife Jodi have two children.
