= Post–law school employment in the United States =

Post–law school employment in the United States reflects the degree to which students who obtain a law degree after attending law school in the United States are able to find employment, and specifically able to find employment in the legal profession or another area relevant to the degree. Because of the high cost of attending law school, the ability of graduates to find employment that pays well enough to recoup that cost is a concern to prospective law students. In some cases, law schools have been criticized for allegedly misrepresenting the difficulty of finding employment.

== Employment statistics and salary information ==
According to the National Association for Law Placement (NALP), only 63% of law graduates from the class of 2015 obtained full time, bar passage required employment. Almost 11% of 2015 graduates were unemployed despite a U.S. unemployment rate of 5%. Over 500 graduates (1.4% of graduates) worked in non-professional positions. NALP reports that within the legal field, salaries are bimodal. A small percentage of graduates from prestigious law schools working for large law firms earn salaries near $160,000. However, most graduates working for smaller law firms, government, and non-profit organizations earn about $40,000 to $60,000.

According to IRS data, the average solo practicing attorney earned $49,130 in 2012. By comparison, the average starting salary of a 2012 college graduate was $44,000 and the median household income in the U.S. was over $51,000 that year. According to the BLS, median attorney pay was $115,820 in 2015. However, the BLS data is skewed upward because of the bimodal distribution of salaries in the legal profession and because the data does not include self-employed attorneys. In addition, the BLS predicts that competition for jobs should continue to be strong because more students are graduating from law school each year than there are jobs available. The BLS also predicts that more price competition over the next decade may lead law firms to rethink their project staffing to reduce costs to clients. Clients are expected to cut back on legal expenses by demanding less expensive rates and scrutinizing invoices. Work that was previously assigned to lawyers, such as document review, may now be given to paralegals and legal assistants. Some routine legal work may also be outsourced to other lower-cost legal providers located overseas.

Brian Tamanaha, a law professor and legal theorist at Washington University, has questioned the accuracy of employment statistics provided by some law schools. He notes that employment and salary information provided by law schools is based on surveys of recent graduates. This information is consolidated and made available by the American Bar Association. In his book entitled "Failing Law Schools," Tamanaha concludes that because of the debt loads and job prospects facing law graduates, "Many law professors at many law schools across the country are selling a degree to their students that they would not recommend to people close to them."

The American legal profession is highly elitist when it comes to employment prospects. As of 2015, only 15% of the nation's law schools (30 out of 206) provided most of the attorneys for Big Law, the collective term for the nation's largest law firms. Only 30 law schools trained 76% of 500-plus and 59% of 250-plus Big Law positions (that is, positions at large law firms with that many attorneys).

== Lifetime value of a law degree ==
According to a peer reviewed study published in the University of Chicago's Journal of Legal Studies and authored by labor economists Michael Simkovic and Frank McIntyre, a law degree increases lifetime earnings by $1,000,000 compared to a bachelor's degree. This is present value, as of the start of law school, and includes opportunity costs and financing costs. After taxes, the mean present value will be around $700,000. At the median, or 50th percentile, the pretax present value is $610,000 and the after tax value is $430,000. After tuition, the median law graduate becomes around $330,000 richer. Even toward the bottom of the distribution, the value of a law degree will typically exceed its costs by hundreds of thousands of dollars. The study was funded by Access Group, a student loan lender.

Law Professor Paul Campos criticized the study because only a very small number of lawyers surveyed graduated in the last decade. Campos also criticized the study for not addressing the fact that the number of law graduates far exceeds the number of legal jobs available. In recent years the ratio of new law graduates to available legal jobs has been about two to one. Campos argues as a labor market becomes more saturated, wages for participants in that market will decline, all other things being equal.

In addition, Simkovic and McIntyre failed to address other economic indicators suggesting changes in the market for legal services. According to Georgetown University's "2016 Report on the State of the Legal Market," 2015 saw a sixth consecutive year of largely flat demand, weakening pricing power and falling productivity. The report notes that since 2008, the law firm market "has changed in significant and fundamental ways." Clients have assumed active control of the organization, staffing, scheduling and pricing of legal matters, where previously they had largely left those decisions in the hands of law firms.

Despite claims that the value of a law degree typically exceeds its cost by hundreds of thousands of dollars, the Department of Education terminated ABA accredited Charlotte Law School's access to federal student financial aid. The Department concluded that Charlotte Law School did not prepare students for participation in the legal profession and misled current and prospective students. The action was taken to protect students and safeguard taxpayer dollars.

Ohio State law professor Deborah Jones Meritt examined job outcomes of the Class of 2010. Her study found that job outcomes for the Class of 2010 improved only marginally five years after graduation. She also found that job outcomes for graduates are stratified by the prestige of the schools they attended. 6.3% of the study population was still not working five years later. Almost 20% of graduates worked in jobs that required no law license. Almost a quarter of graduates working in public service held positions that did not require bar admission. The non-lawyering positions also rarely involved policymaking. Members of the study population held positions as police officers, customer service clerks, parole officers, and government auditors. More than 10% of the study population worked in business jobs that did not require bar admission. About 2.5% of the population worked in non-professional jobs including tennis instruction, office management, lingerie sales, and pest control. Almost 10% of the research population worked as a solo practitioner. However, she found that some of these solo practitioners supplemented their income with jobs that did not require a law license, such as insurance sales, investment, firefighting, party planning, and substitute teaching.

=== Lawsuits related to American legal education ===
In 2011, several law schools were sued for fraud and for misleading job placement statistics. Prior to 2011, law schools typically advertised that more than 90% of their graduates were employed after graduation earning six figure salaries. In fact, these claims were false. Most of these suits have been dismissed on the merits. Judges dismissed the lawsuits because they determined that college graduates considering law schools are a sophisticated subset of education consumers, capable of sifting through data and weighing alternatives before making a decision regarding their postcollege options. In MacDonald vs. Cooley Law School, the court found the Cooley Law School' claim, that their employment statistics represented the average of all graduates, to be "objectively untrue" (it was calculated from a sample of 780 out of a total of 934 graduates). The graduates reliance on the statistics was however found to be unreasonable. In dismissing the lawsuit against New York Law School, Judge Melvin Schweitzer noted "it is also difficult for the court to conceive that somehow lost on these plaintiffs is the fact that goodly number of law school graduates toil — perhaps part-time — in drudgery or have less than hugely successful careers." Many of the lawsuits were filed against low ranked law schools with poor reputations. Courts noted that graduates could have deduced it would be difficult to find full-time legal jobs after graduating from a poorly ranked school.

In December 2016, students of ABA accredited Charlotte Law School filed a $5 million class action lawsuit against the school for deceptive and unfair trade practices, unjust enrichment, breach of fiduciary duty, and fraud. The students claimed that Charlotte Law School took advantage of their position of trust, and made substantial misrepresentations to current and prospective students, in order to realize financial benefit from the tuition and fees paid by current and prospective students.
