= Attorney of record =

Especially in United States usage, an attorney of record is any lawyer recognized by a court as representing (and therefore responsible to) a party to legal proceedings before it. Provided he or she is qualified to appear before the court in question, an attorney may become attorney of record for a party either by notifying the court of the attorney-client relationship, or by being so designated or appointed by the court.

The attorney of record is the attorney who formally appears before the court, whether in person or by means of signed documents, on behalf of a party. However, the status is also an enforcement mechanism for a jurisdiction's applicable standards of legal ethics and professional responsibility (for example, the American Bar Association Model Rules of Professional Conduct). Once an attorney is recognized as attorney of record, the attorney has a responsibility to continue representing the party in the proceedings until the case ends, or until granted leave by the court to withdraw.

Federal Rule of Civil Procedure 5(b) states that, if a party is represented by an attorney, service of legal action in most cases must be made on the attorney, unless the court orders service on the party. The case of Guam Economic Development Authority v. Ulloa confirmed that service on an attorney of record is an "adequate" means of serving notice on the attorney's client.
