= Brian Goldman =

Canadian physician

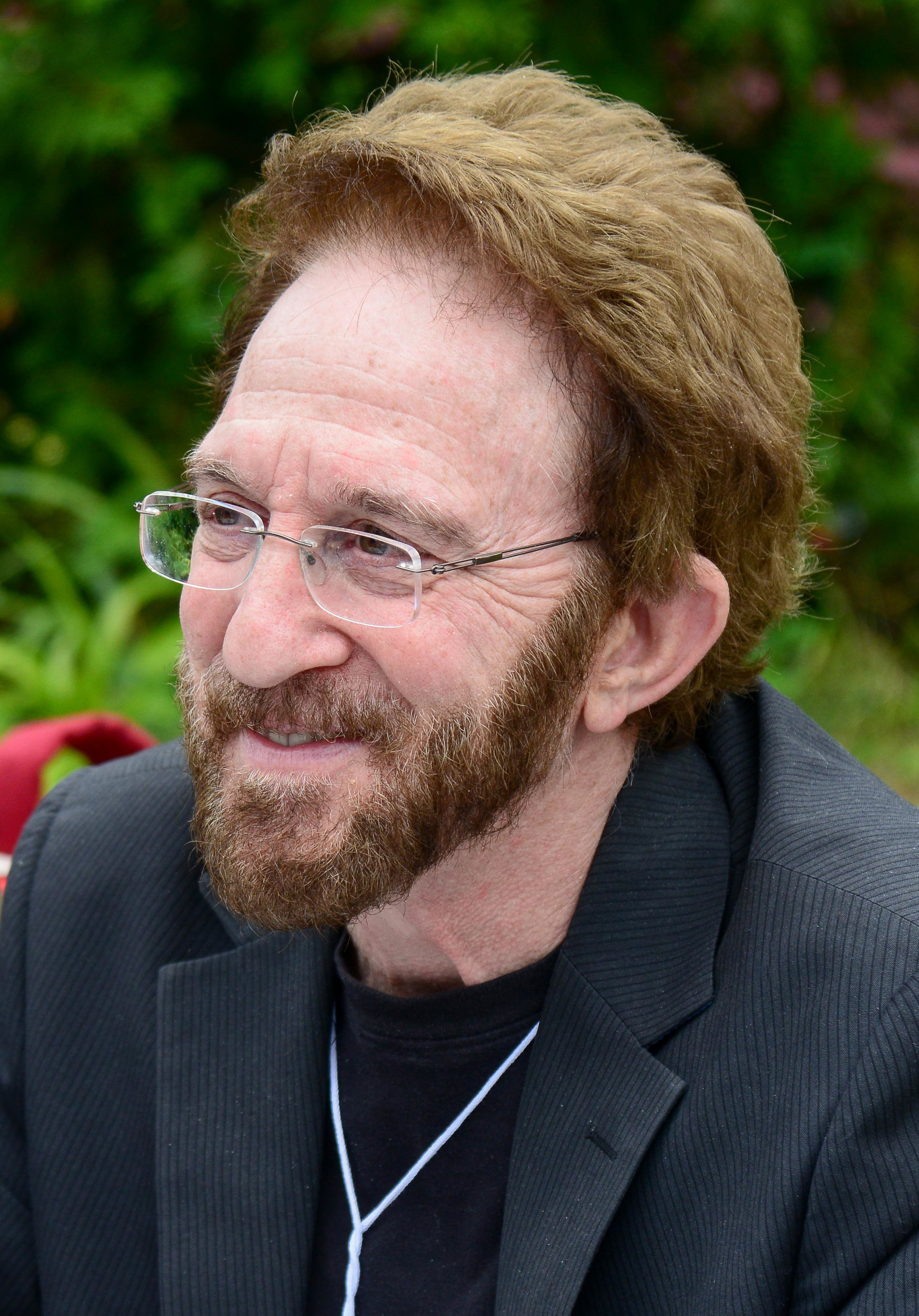
Goldman at the Eden Mills Writers' Festival in 2018

Howard Brian Goldman (born 1956) is a Canadian emergency physician, author, public speaker, and radio personality.

== Education and career ==
He completed his undergraduate medical education at the University of Toronto in 1980. In July 1980, he began postgraduate medical education in family medicine. On 15 January 1982, Goldman obtained his Independent Practice Certificate from the College of Physicians and Surgeons of Ontario. He received his certification in family medicine from the College of Family Physicians of Canada (CFPC) in July 1984, followed by a certificate of advanced competency in emergency medicine from the CFPC in November 1985.

He practices in the Schwartz Reisman Emergency Centre at Mount Sinai Hospital in Toronto, Ontario, Canada.

Goldman has been a regular medical columnist on CBC Radio One since 1999.

Goldman was also awarded fellowship in the CFPC, thereby entitled to display the "FCPF" special designation, in addition to his current membership certification in both family medicine and emergency medicine domains, "MCFP (EM)".

== Broadcasting ==
He also hosts an award-winning current affairs radio series, White Coat, Black Art, on CBC Radio One about the culture of modern medicine and various aspects of the Canadian health care system and is the house Doctor for the Afternoon Edition on CBC Radio One in Saskatchewan. In addition to the series' podcast copy of their content, Dr. Goldman has a concurrent original podcast, The Dose, which has a similar medical theme.

== Author ==
In 2010, his first book, The Night Shift: Real Life in the Heart of the ER, was published by HarperCollins Canada. The Night Shift is a book on his experiences working the night shift as an emergency physician. His second book, The Secret Language of Doctors is about slang or argot terms used by doctors, nurses, and other health professionals to talk about patients, unpleasant clinical situations, as well as colleagues.

His third book is The Power of Kindness, 2018, at HarperCollins Canada.

His fourth book is The Power of Teamwork, 2022, at HarperCollins Canada.

His fifth book is The Casino Shift, 2026.

== Film ==
Goldman had a small and uncredited role in the 1971 film Summer of '42.
