= Decennial liability =

Decennial liability insurance or "Inherent Defect Insurance" is insurance that is taken out (by the contractor or principal) to cover costs associated with the potential collapse of a building after completion. The name comes from the fact that it covers the 10-year period (decade) after project completion. In terms of liability, it can apply to the stability of buildings in their entirety, or it can also apply to selected parts of those works, or equipment and installations within such works. In reality, there is a fine line as to when decennial liability applies: for instance, decennial liability would apply to a central heating system or industrial pipes, but not to sanitary fittings.

Decennial liability is enshrined in the Civil Code of many civil law jurisdictions.

== History and other countries with ten-year insurance ==
Decennial liability dates back to 1804, the date of the Civil Code of the French. However, it was only in 1978 that the statute was enacted in order to impose mandatory insurance of construction risks. This new legislation, which was primarily aimed at offering residential owners recourse against Contractors, is mandatory, which means that the failure to take out insurance can trigger criminal sanctions and also that insurers can be compelled to insure a Contractor should he not be able to obtain coverage. It also implies that the content of insurance policies is heavily regulated and cannot be derogated from by the insurer and the insured.

Civil law jurisdictions where decennial liability applies include, but are not limited to, France, Belgium, Egypt, Lebanon, Syria, Kuwait, the United Arab Emirates, Qatar, Angola, Bolivia (3 years), Brazil, Chile (5 years), Indonesia, Philippines (15 years), Louisiana (USA), Romania and Sweden. It is compulsory to insure in a few countries such as France, and Egypt. In other countries like Qatar there is the form of strict liability arising from the French Civil Code which does not require any proof of fault, but there is no compulsory requirement to insure. The cost of the insurance can significantly increase construction costs and may be up to 1.5% of structural value (including the Technical Inspections that the insurers mandate).

Under French law (Article L241-1 of the Insurance Code), every builder is required to purchase a ten-year insurance policy covering the mandatory decennial warranty on all construction projects. The decennial warranty is a legal liability assumed by builders for all defects that compromise the integrity of their structures or that cause them to become unsuited for their intended purposes. This responsibility is mandated by Article 1792 et seq. of the Civil Code. It is imposed on builders for ten years from the acceptance date of the structure. Under Article 880 of the UAE Civil Code, decennial liability imposes joint liability on contractors and architects from the handover of the works, requiring them to compensate the Employer for whole or partial collapse or any defect threatening the structural stability or safety of a building or installation.

In FIDIC forms of contract, the decennial liability starts after the issuance of the Performance Certificate and is therefore issued upon the expiration of the Defects Notification Period. Therefore, the decennial liability establishes an additional liability period for defects, which means that the liability risk can last for a period of 13 years or more in the FIDIC forms of contract (including the standard Defects Notification Period of 12 months and a possible extension by 2 years).
