= Duty to settle =

In law, the duty to settle is an insurer's implied obligation to accept a settlement in a case against one of its insured parties if it is likely that a potential judgement against the insured will exceed policy limits. If a liability insurer exposes the insured to excess risk by failing to settle within policy limits, they may be liable for any damages incurred.

== United States law ==
Liability insurance policies in the United States typically make no express contractual promise to settle.

=== California ===
In California, "an insurer, who wrongfully refuses to accept a reasonable settlement within the policy limits is liable for the entire judgment against the insured even if it exceeds the policy limits." California Insurance Code §790-790.15 states that the insurer has an obligation to attempt "in good faith to effectuate prompt, fair, and equitable settlements of claims in which liability has become reasonably clear."

A rationale for this duty is that "[w]hen an offer is made to settle a claim in excess of policy limits for an amount within policy limits, a genuine and immediate conflict of interest arises between carrier and assured." "An insurer who denies coverage does so at its own risk. Such factors as a belief that the policy does not provide coverage, should not affect a decision as to whether the settlement offer in question is a reasonable one." "It is the duty of the insurer to keep the insured informed of settlement offers." "[A]n insurer potentially can be liable for unreasonably coercing an insured to contribute to a settlement fund."

An insurer may not "discriminate in its claims settlement practices based upon" certain protected classes.

=== Texas ===
The Texas Supreme Court ruled in G. A. Stowers Furniture Co. v. American Indemnity Co., that insurers can be held liable for negligently refusing a settlement within policy limits.
