= Lutidine =

Lutidine is the trivial name used to describe the chemical compounds which are dimethyl derivatives of pyridine. They were discovered in Dippel's oil and named (as an anagram of toluidine, with which they share their empirical formula) by Thomas Anderson in 1851. Their chemical properties resemble those of pyridine, although the presence of the methyl groups may prohibit some of the more straightforward reactions. Lutidine comes in several isomers:

- 2,3-Lutidine (2,3-dimethylpyridine)
- 2,4-Lutidine (2,4-dimethylpyridine)
- 2,5-Lutidine (2,5-dimethylpyridine)
- 2,6-Lutidine (2,6-dimethylpyridine)
- 3,4-Lutidine (3,4-dimethylpyridine)
- 3,5-Lutidine (3,5-dimethylpyridine)

Lutidines
Name	2,3-Lutidine	2,4-Lutidine	2,5-Lutidine	2,6-Lutidine	3,4-Lutidine	3,5-Lutidine
Systematic Name	2,3-Dimethylpyridine	2,4-Dimethylpyridine	2,5-Dimethylpyridine	2,6-Dimethylpyridine	3,4-Dimethylpyridine	3,5-Dimethylpyridine
Structural formula						
CAS Registry Number	583-61-9	108-47-4	589-93-5	108-48-5	583-58-4	591-22-0

All isomers share the molecular weight 107,16 g/mol and the chemical formula C_{7}H_{9}N.

== Applications ==
- 3,4-Lutidine [583-58-4] has formal application in the synthesis of a large bevy of benzomorphan opioid analgesics including: Metazocine, Phenazocine, Ketazocine, Pentazocine, Tonazocine, Volazocine, Cyclazocine, Alazocine, 8-Carboxamidocyclazocine, Fluorophen, Quadazocine, ID-1229, LP-1, MR-2034 [57236-85-8].
- 2,3-Lutidine [583-61-9] has application in the synthesis of Rabeprazole, Lansoprazole, Ilaprazole
