= C7H9N =

The molecular formula C_{7}H_{9}N may refer to:

- Benzylamine
- Lutidines (dimethylpyridines)
  - 2,4-Lutidine
  - 2,6-Lutidine
  - 3,5-Lutidine
- N-Methylaniline
- Toluidines
  - o-Toluidine
  - m-Toluidine
  - p-Toluidine
