= C7H15N =

== Description ==
C7H15N, otherwise known as cyclohexanemethylamine, is a corrosive, flammable chemical that may cause severe burns when exposed to skin or eyes.

The molecular formula C_{7}H_{15}N (molar mass: 113.20 g/mol, exact mass: 113.1204 u) may refer to:

- Azocane
- Dimethylpiperidines
  - 2,6-Dimethylpiperidine
  - 3,5-Dimethylpiperidine
