= C23H35NO2 =

List of chemical structure articles associated with the same molecular formula

The molecular formula C_{23}H_{35}NO_{2} may refer to:

- Pentolame
- Tonazocine
- Zenazocine
