= C15H21NO =

The molecular formula C_{15}H_{21}NO (molar mass: 231.33 g/mol) may refer to:

- 4-Dimethylamino-4-(p-tolyl)cyclohexanone
- Eptazocine
- Metazocine, an opioid analgesic
- 4'-Methyl-α-pyrrolidinobutiophenone
- 8-OH-PBZI
- α-Pyrrolidinopentiophenone
