= Metazocine =

Opioid analgesic

Clinical data
- ATC code: none

Legal status
- Legal status: BR: Class A1 (Narcotic drugs); CA: Schedule I; DE: Anlage I (Authorized scientific use only); US: Schedule II

Identifiers
- IUPAC name: (2R,6R,11R)-3,6,11-Trimethyl-1,2,3,4,5,6-hexahydro-2,6-methanobenzo[d]azocin-8-ol
- CAS Number: 3734-52-9
- PubChem CID: 62518
- ChemSpider: 56292
- UNII: XD53YGT34W
- KEGG: C11789
- ChEMBL: ChEMBL257661
- CompTox Dashboard (EPA): DTXSID20872483
- ECHA InfoCard: 100.020.998

Chemical and physical data
- Formula: C_{15}H_{21}NO
- Molar mass: 231.339 g·mol^{−1}
- 3D model (JSmol): Interactive image
- SMILES: OC1=CC([C@@](C)([C@@]2([H])C)CCN(C)[C@]2([H])C3)=C3C=C1
- InChI: InChI=1S/C15H21NO/c1-10-14-8-11-4-5-12(17)9-13(11)15(10,2)6-7-16(14)3/h4-5,9-10,14,17H,6-8H2,1-3H3; Key:YGSVZRIZCHZUHB-UHFFFAOYSA-N

Metazocine is an opioid analgesic related to pentazocine. While metazocine has significant analgesic effects, mediated through a mixed agonist–antagonist action at the mu opioid receptor, its clinical use is limited by dysphoric and hallucinogenic effects which are most likely caused by activity at kappa opioid receptors (where it is a high-efficacy agonist) and/or sigma receptors.

Metazocine is in Schedule II of the Controlled Substances Act 1970 of the United States as a Narcotic with ACSCN 9240 with a 19 gram aggregate manufacturing quota as of 2014. The free base conversion ratio for salts includes 0.81 for the hydrochloride and 0.74 for the hydrobromide. It is listed under the Single Convention for the Control of Narcotic Substances 1961 and is controlled in most countries in the same fashion as is morphine.

== Syntheses ==
The benzomorphan, metazocine (6), can be obtained from a variation of the morphinan synthesis.

Reaction of the Grignard reagent from p-methoxybenzyl chloride (1) with the lutidine methiodide (2) affords the benzylated dihydropyridine (3). Reduction of the enamine π-bond leads to the tetrahydropyridine (4). Cyclization by means of acid leads directly to the benzomorphan ring system (5). Demethylation of the aromatic ring system gives the phenol. Although this last compound is in fact a relatively potent analgesic, it is not available commercially as a drug. Also see:

== See also ==
- Phenazocine
- Pentazocine
- Cyclazocine
