= Lupetidine =

Lupetidine may refer to:

- 2,6-Lupetidine
- 3,5-Lupetidine
