= C18H25NO =

The molecular formula C_{18}H_{25}NO may refer to:

- Aminoestradiol
- Cyclazocine
- Methorphans
  - Dextromethorphan
  - Levomethorphan
  - Racemethorphan
- Nepinalone
- α-PCYP
- 2β-Propanoyl-3β-(4-tolyl)-tropane
