= Anazocine =

Chemical compound

Clinical data
- ATC code: None

Identifiers
- IUPAC name: 9-Methoxy-3-methyl-9-phenyl-3-azabicyclo[3.3.1]nonane
- CAS Number: 15378-99-1 21650-02-2 (citrate)
- PubChem CID: 27213
- ChemSpider: 25327
- UNII: K2S5VMM2SG
- ChEMBL: ChEMBL2105792
- CompTox Dashboard (EPA): DTXSID30864591

Chemical and physical data
- Formula: C_{16}H_{23}NO
- Molar mass: 245.366 g·mol^{−1}
- 3D model (JSmol): Interactive image
- SMILES: O(C2(c1ccccc1)C3CCCC2CN(C3)C)C
- InChI: InChI=1S/C16H23NO/c1-17-11-14-9-6-10-15(12-17)16(14,18-2)13-7-4-3-5-8-13/h3-5,7-8,14-15H,6,9-12H2,1-2H3; Key:YFFNPIAPUDUYAU-UHFFFAOYSA-N

Anazocine (INN; also known as azabicyclane or CS-307) is an opioid analgesic of the morphan/benzomorphan family developed in the middle 1960s in the United States which was never marketed.

The structure and properties of several related α- and β-azabicyclane opioids was explored. Anazocine's chemical and structural relatives include opioid partial agonists, mixed agonist-antagonists, pure agonists, antagonists, and atypical non-opioid analgesics. It was tested in pigeons and in other experiments which contrasted and compared its analgesic effects to those of the phenazepine opioid ethoheptazine and the phenalkoxam open chain opioid propoxyphene, and pethidine as well.

== See also ==
- Benzomorphan
- P-7521
