= Dimethylpiperidine =

Dimethylpiperidine may refer to:

- 2,6-Dimethylpiperidine
- 3,5-Dimethylpiperidine
