= AE2 =

AE2 may refer to:

- HMAS AE2, E-class submarine of the Royal Australian Navy
- Aero Ae 02, a design of Czechoslovak plane
- Anion Exchanger 2, transport protein
- Ape Escape 2
- A size designation for Constantinian bronze coins
- Applied Energistics 2, a popular mod for the video game Minecraft
- Aminoestradiol, a synthetic estrogen
