= C22H26FNO =

The molecular formula C_{22}H_{26}FNO (molar mass: 339.454 g/mol) may refer to:

- Fluorophen
- 4F-4PP
