= C23H29NO2 =

The molecular formula C_{23}H_{29}NO_{2} (molar mass: 351.49 g/mol) may refer to:

- Phenadoxone
- P-7521
