= C18H25NO2 =

The molecular formula C_{18}H_{25}NO_{2} (molar mass: 287.40 g/mol, exact mass: 287.1885 u) may refer to:

- Allylprodine
- Methylenedioxyphencyclidine (MDPCP)
- Moxazocine (BL-4566)
- RTI-83 ((–)-2β-carbomethoxy-3β-(4-ethylphenyl)tropane)
