= C11H9N =

The molecular formula C_{11}H_{9}N (molar mass: 155.20 g/mol, exact mass: 155.0735 u) may refer to:

- Benzazocine, or benzoazocine
- 2-Phenylpyridine
