= Morishita =

Morishita (written: 森下) is a Japanese surname. Notable people with the surname include:

- Akira Morishita (森下 晃; born 2001), Filipino-Japanese actor, singer and member of Filipino boy group BGYO
- Chisaki Morishita (森下 千咲), Japanese voice actress
- Hitoshi Morishita (footballer, born 1967) (森下 仁之) (1967–2025), Japanese footballer and manager
- Hitoshi Morishita (footballer, born 1972) (森下 仁志), Japanese footballer
- Isao Morishita (森下 勲), Japanese motorcycle racer
- Junpei Morishita (森下 純平; born 1990), Japanese judoka
- Katsuji Morishita (森下 勝司), Japanese animator
- Koichi Morishita (森下 広一; born 1967), Japanese long-distance runner
- Naochika Morishita (森下 直親; born 1971), Japanese illustrator
- Ryoya Morishita (森下 龍矢; born 1997), Japanese footballer
- Satoko Morishita (森下 恵子; born 1974), Japanese swimmer
- Shigetada Morishita (森下 重格), Japanese mayor
- Shinichi Morishita (森下 申一; born 1960), Japanese footballer
- Shōta Morishita (森下 翔太; born 2000), Japanese baseball player
- Shun Morishita (森下 俊; born 1986), Japanese footballer
- Takeshi Morishita (森下 健; born 1932), Japanese physician
- Taku Morishita (森下 卓; born 1966), Japanese shogi player
- Yoko Morishita (森下 洋子; born 1948), Japanese ballet dancer
- Yoshiteru Morishita (森下 由輝; born 1971), Japanese long-distance runner

== See also ==
- Morishita Station (disambiguation), multiple railway stations in Japan
