= C8H15N =

The molecular formula C_{8}H_{15}N (molar mass: 125.21 g/mol, exact mass: 125.1204 u) may refer to:

- Indolizidine
- Morphan
- Tropane
