= C21H31NO2 =

The molecular formula C_{21}H_{31}NO_{2} may refer to:

- Androisoxazole
- Bornaprine
- EIDD-036 (progesterone 20-oxime)
- Golexanolone
- 4-HTMPIPO
- Prolame
