= C18H25N =

The molecular formula C_{18}H_{25}N (molar mass: 255.40 g/mol, exact mass: 255.1987 u) may refer to:

- Dimemorfan, or 3,17-dimethylmorphinan, a cough suppressant of the morphinan family
- Naphthylpropylaminopentane
- Volazocine, an opioid analgesic of the benzomorphan class which was never marketed
