= Azocine =

Names
- Preferred IUPAC name (3Z,5Z,7Z)-Azocine
- Other names Azacyclooctatetraene

Identifiers
| CAS Number | 292-65-9 |
| 3D model (JSmol) | Interactive image |
| ChemSpider | 4953946 |
| PubChem CID | 6451481 |
| CompTox Dashboard (EPA) | DTXSID201028847 |
- InChI: InChI=1S/C7H7N/c1-2-4-6-8-7-5-3-1/h1-7H/b2-1-,3-1-,4-2-,5-3-,6-4-,7-5-,8-6-,8-7- Key: XXRGLCKZBCIEKO-BONZMOEMSA-N; InChI=1/C7H7N/c1-2-4-6-8-7-5-3-1/h1-7H/b2-1-,3-1-,4-2-,5-3-,6-4-,7-5-,8-6-,8-7- Key: XXRGLCKZBCIEKO-BONZMOEMBP
- SMILES: N=1\C=C/C=C\C=C/C=1

Properties
| Chemical formula | C_{7}H_{7}N |
| Molar mass | 105.140 g·mol^{−1} |
- Except where otherwise noted, data are given for materials in their standard state (at 25 °C [77 °F], 100 kPa). verify (what is ?) Infobox references

Azocine is a heterocyclic organic compound with the molecular formula C_{7}H_{7}N. It consists of an unsaturated eight-membered ring having seven carbon atoms, one nitrogen atom and four double bonds.

The parent compound is thermally unstable and polymerizes at −50 °C. It can be prepared temporarily through diazabasketene pyrolysis: a retro-Diels–Alder decomposition and subsequent hydrocyanic acid elimination.

Nakadomarin A

Nevertheless, azocine-type rings are found in many natural products. The potential antibiotic nakadomarin A, a manzamine-type marine alkaloid, contains a partially saturated azocine within its fused, hexacyclic ring system.

Saturated or partially saturated azocine rings also form the core structure defining the azocine opioid family. These include cyclazocine, pentazocine, and phenazocine.

== See also ==
- Benzomorphan
- Azocane
