= Morphan =

Names
- IUPAC name 2-Azabicyclo[3.3.1]nonane

Identifiers
CAS Number	280-66-0
3D model (JSmol)	Interactive image
ChemSpider	10819099
PubChem CID	12312973
CompTox Dashboard (EPA)	DTXSID20487415
- InChI: InChI=1S/C8H15N/c1-2-7-4-5-9-8(3-1)6-7/h7-9H,1-6H2 Key: ZPAPCUKKKOSLPZ-UHFFFAOYSA-N
- SMILES: C1(C2)CCCC2NCC1

Properties
Chemical formula	C_{8}H_{15}N
Molar mass	125.215 g·mol^{−1}
Melting point	131 to 132 °C (268 to 270 °F; 404 to 405 K)
- Except where otherwise noted, data are given for materials in their standard state (at 25 °C [77 °F], 100 kPa). verify (what is ?) Infobox references

Morphan is a chemical compound. It is the base of the benzomorphan family of drugs.

Morphan-ring (blue) in benzomorphan

== See also ==
- Azocine
- Morphinan
