= Eptazocine =

Opioid analgesic

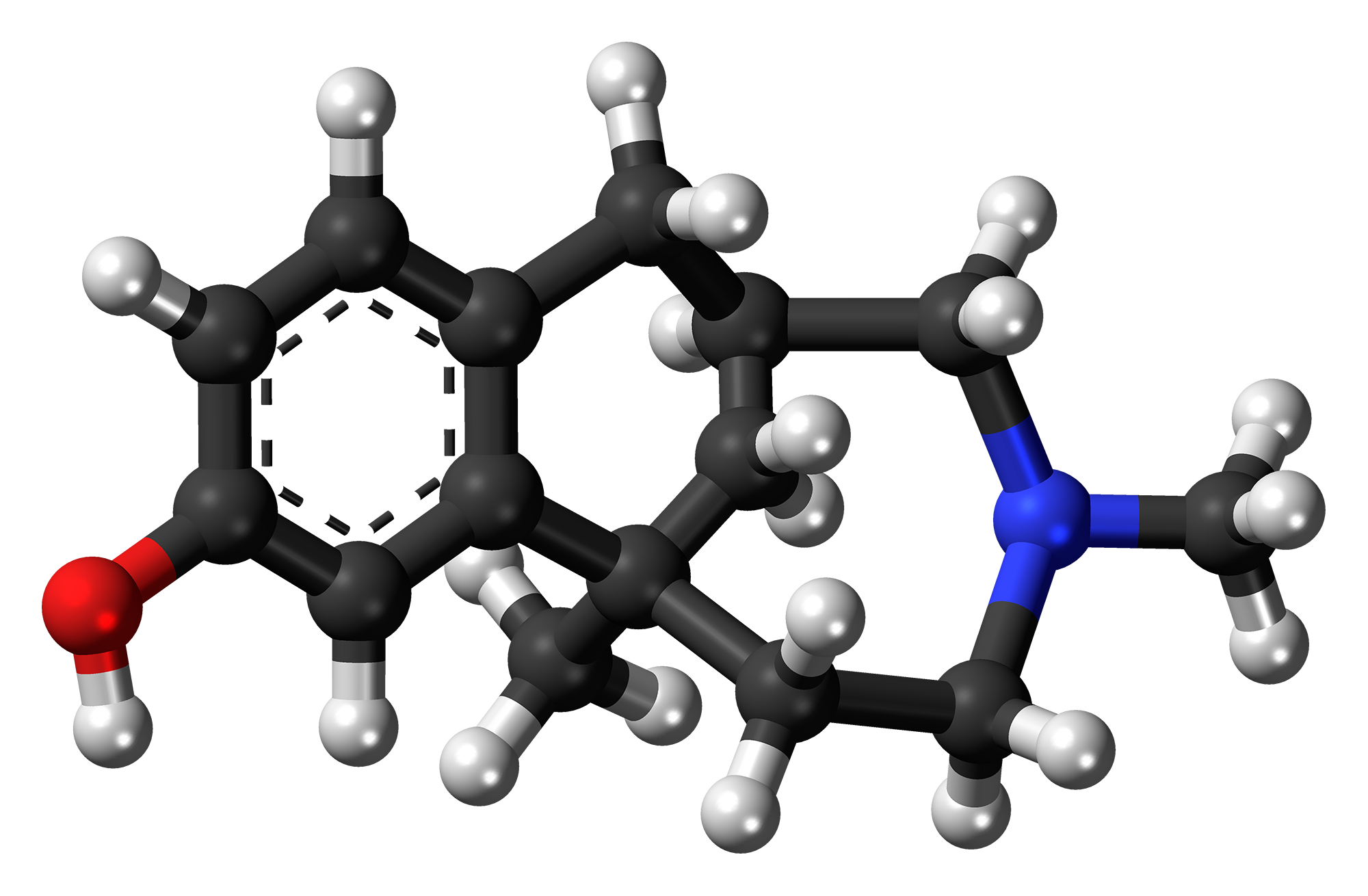

Clinical data
- Routes of administration: Oral
- ATC code: None

Legal status
- Legal status: In general: ℞ (Prescription only)

Identifiers
- IUPAC name: (1S,6S)-1,4-dimethyl-2,3,4,5,6,7-hexahydro-1H-1,6-methano-4-benzazonin-10-ol
- CAS Number: 72522-13-5 72150-17-5 (bromide)
- PubChem CID: 3042090
- ChemSpider: 2305268
- UNII: 2208ZLI77S
- ChEMBL: ChEMBL70566
- CompTox Dashboard (EPA): DTXSID501024513

Chemical and physical data
- Formula: C_{15}H_{21}NO
- Molar mass: 231.339 g·mol^{−1}
- 3D model (JSmol): Interactive image
- SMILES: Oc1ccc2c(c1)[C@@]3(CCN(C[C@H](C2)C3)C)C
- InChI: InChI=1S/C15H21NO/c1-15-5-6-16(2)10-11(9-15)7-12-3-4-13(17)8-14(12)15/h3-4,8,11,17H,5-7,9-10H2,1-2H3/t11-,15-/m1/s1; Key:ZOWQTJXNFTWSCS-IAQYHMDHSA-N

Eptazocine (Sedapain) is an opioid analgesic which was introduced in Japan by Morishita in 1987. It acts as a mixed κ-opioid receptor agonist and μ-opioid receptor antagonist.

== See also ==
- Benzomorphan
