= MR-2034 =

Clinical data
- Other names: MR2034; Mr-2034; (–)-MR-2033; (–)-MR2033
- Drug class: κ-Opioid receptor agonist; Hallucinogen
- ATC code: None

Identifiers
- IUPAC name: (1R,9R)-1,13-dimethyl-10-[[(2R)-oxolan-2-yl]methyl]-10-azatricyclo[7.3.1.0^{2,7}]trideca-2(7),3,5-trien-4-ol
- CAS Number: 57236-85-8
- PubChem CID: 123980
- ChemSpider: 110499
- CompTox Dashboard (EPA): DTXSID20972735

Chemical and physical data
- Formula: C_{19}H_{27}NO_{2}
- Molar mass: 301.430 g·mol^{−1}
- 3D model (JSmol): Interactive image
- SMILES: CC1[C@H]2CC3=C([C@@]1(CCN2C[C@H]4CCCO4)C)C=C(C=C3)O
- InChI: InChI=1S/C19H27NO2/c1-13-18-10-14-5-6-15(21)11-17(14)19(13,2)7-8-20(18)12-16-4-3-9-22-16/h5-6,11,13,16,18,21H,3-4,7-10,12H2,1-2H3/t13?,16-,18-,19-/m1/s1; Key:NLKLXMMOJZHSCB-SENCRUMESA-N

MR-2034, or Mr-2034, also known as (–)-MR-2033, is a selective κ-opioid receptor (KOR) agonist of the benzomorphan family. Unlike other benzomorphan KOR agonists like cyclazocine and alazocine, MR-2034 does not also act on sigma receptors. In addition to the KOR, it has affinity for the μ-opioid receptor (MOR), but does not activate this receptor. The drug produces dose-dependent hallucinogenic and dysphoric effects in humans, as well as other effects such as dizziness, anxiety, and sedation. These effects can be blocked by the non-selective opioid receptor antagonist naloxone. The preceding findings led to the conclusion that the hallucinogenic and dysphoric effects of benzomorphans are mediated by the KOR rather than by sigma receptors. MR-2034 was first described in the scientific literature by 1975 and its hallucinogenic effects in humans were described in 1986.

== See also ==
- κ-Opioid receptor agonist
