= P-7521 =

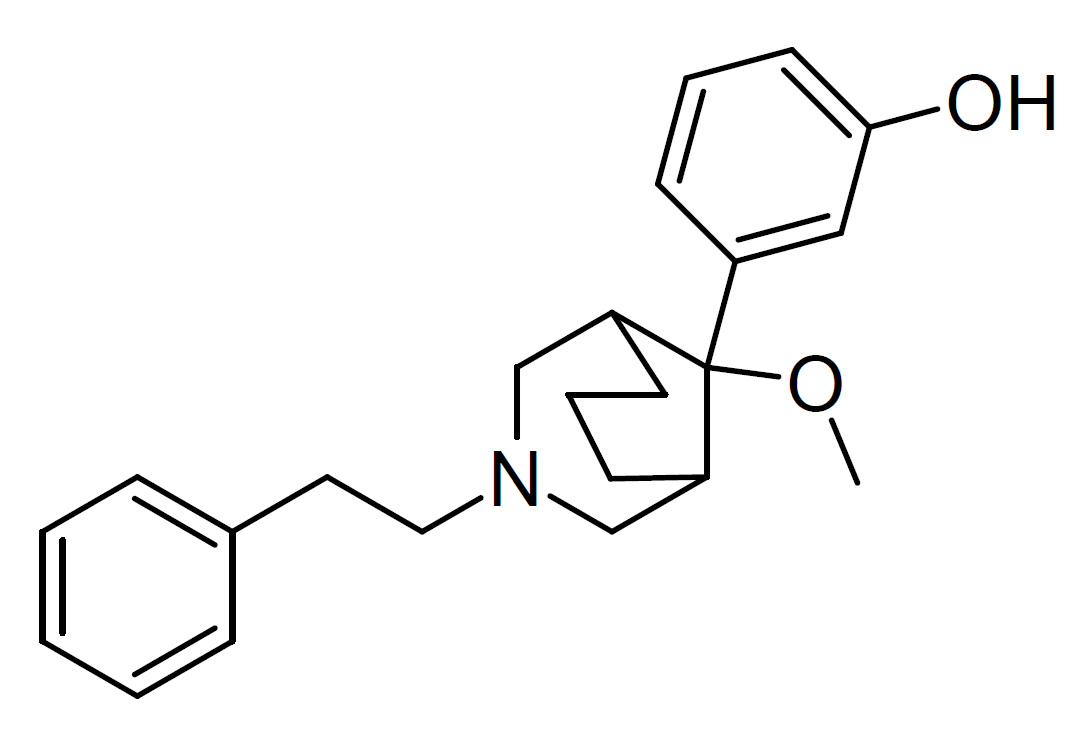

Identifiers
- IUPAC name: 3-[9-methoxy-3-(2-phenylethyl)-3-azabicyclo[3.3.1]nonan-9-yl]phenol
- CAS Number: 92836-37-8
- PubChem CID: 146384
- ChemSpider: 129116
- CompTox Dashboard (EPA): DTXSID60918935

Chemical and physical data
- Formula: C_{23}H_{29}NO_{2}
- Molar mass: 351.490 g·mol^{−1}
- 3D model (JSmol): Interactive image
- SMILES: COC1(C2CCCC1CN(C2)CCC3=CC=CC=C3)C4=CC(=CC=C4)O
- InChI: InChI=1S/C23H29NO2/c1-26-23(19-9-6-12-22(25)15-19)20-10-5-11-21(23)17-24(16-20)14-13-18-7-3-2-4-8-18/h2-4,6-9,12,15,20-21,25H,5,10-11,13-14,16-17H2,1H3; Key:UXFOUDJIDGKJDT-UHFFFAOYSA-N

P-7521 is an opioid analgesic drug developed in China in the 1980s.

== See also ==
- Anazocine
- Phenazocine
