= Hexolame =

Chemical compound

Clinical data
- Other names: 17β-((6-Hydroxyhexyl)amino)estradiol; 17β-[(6-Hydroxyhexyl)amino]estra-1,3,5(10)-trien-3-ol; N-(3-Hydroxy-1,3,5(10)-estratrien 17-yl)-6-hydroxyhexylamine

Identifiers
- IUPAC name: (8R,9S,13S,14S,17S)-17-(6-Hydroxyhexylamino)-13-methyl-6,7,8,9,11,12,14,15,16,17-decahydrocyclopenta[a]phenanthren-3-ol
- CAS Number: 110346-23-1
- PubChem CID: 196635
- ChemSpider: 170347
- UNII: ESL7LZ0FOL
- CompTox Dashboard (EPA): DTXSID10911613

Chemical and physical data
- Formula: C_{24}H_{37}NO_{2}
- Molar mass: 371.565 g·mol^{−1}
- 3D model (JSmol): Interactive image
- SMILES: C[C@]12CC[C@H]3[C@H]([C@@H]1CC[C@@H]2NCCCCCCO)CCC4=C3C=CC(=C4)O
- InChI: InChI=1S/C24H37NO2/c1-24-13-12-20-19-9-7-18(27)16-17(19)6-8-21(20)22(24)10-11-23(24)25-14-4-2-3-5-15-26/h7,9,16,20-23,25-27H,2-6,8,10-15H2,1H3/t20-,21-,22+,23+,24+/m1/s1; Key:DPRSBWGNESQTLG-DJCPXJLLSA-N

Hexolame, also known as 17β-((6-hydroxyhexyl)amino)estradiol, is a synthetic, steroidal estrogen and a 17β-aminoestrogen with anticoagulant effects that was first described in 1990 and was never marketed.
