= 17β-Aminoestrogen =

Class of chemical compounds

Prolame, a 17β-aminoestrogen.

17β-Aminoestrogens are a group of synthetic, steroidal estrogens derived from estradiol which have an amine substitution in place of the hydroxyl group at the C17β position. They are estrogenic similarly, but, unlike estradiol, show sustained anticoagulant activity that appears to be mediated by non-genomic mechanisms. As such, it is thought that they may have a reduced risk of venous thromboembolism. The 17β-aminoestrogens include the base or parent estrogen aminoestradiol (AE_{2}) and the extended-chain derivatives butolame, hexolame, pentolame, prodiame, and prolame. They are a homologous series of steroids.
