= Butolame =

Chemical compound

Clinical data
- Other names: 17β-((4-Hydroxybutyl)amino)estradiol; 17β-[(4-Hydroxybutyl)amino]estra-1,3,5(10)-trien-3-ol

Identifiers
- IUPAC name: (8R,9S,13S,14S,17S)-17-(4-Hydroxybutylamino)-13-methyl-6,7,8,9,11,12,14,15,16,17-decahydrocyclopenta[a]phenanthren-3-ol
- CAS Number: 150748-23-5
- PubChem CID: 197608
- ChemSpider: 171062
- UNII: 4UPR2B5SG4
- CompTox Dashboard (EPA): DTXSID80934056

Chemical and physical data
- Formula: C_{22}H_{33}NO_{2}
- Molar mass: 343.511 g·mol^{−1}
- 3D model (JSmol): Interactive image
- SMILES: C[C@]12CC[C@H]3[C@H]([C@@H]1CC[C@@H]2NCCCCO)CCC4=C3C=CC(=C4)O
- InChI: InChI=1S/C22H33NO2/c1-22-11-10-18-17-7-5-16(25)14-15(17)4-6-19(18)20(22)8-9-21(22)23-12-2-3-13-24/h5,7,14,18-21,23-25H,2-4,6,8-13H2,1H3/t18-,19-,20+,21+,22+/m1/s1; Key:AXFQQAQJYIXKGS-AANPDWTMSA-N

Butolame, also known as 17β-((4-hydroxybutyl)amino)estradiol, is a synthetic, steroidal estrogen and a 17β-aminoestrogen with anticoagulant effects that was first described in 1993 and was never marketed.
