= Quadazocine =

Chemical compound

Clinical data
- ATC code: None

Identifiers
- IUPAC name: 1-cyclopentyl-5-[(1S,9R)-4-hydroxy-1,10,13-trimethyl-10-azatricyclo[7.3.1.0^{2,7}]trideca-2,4,6-trien-13-yl]-3-pentanone
- CAS Number: 71276-43-2
- PubChem CID: 115077
- ChemSpider: 102983
- UNII: X9BMD58553
- CompTox Dashboard (EPA): DTXSID30990187

Chemical and physical data
- Formula: C_{25}H_{37}NO_{2}
- Molar mass: 383.576 g·mol^{−1}
- 3D model (JSmol): Interactive image
- SMILES: O=C(CCC1CCCC1)CCC4([C@@H]3N(CC[C@]4(c2c(ccc(O)c2)C3)C)C)C
- InChI: InChI=1S/C25H37NO2/c1-24-14-15-26(3)23(16-19-9-11-21(28)17-22(19)24)25(24,2)13-12-20(27)10-8-18-6-4-5-7-18/h9,11,17-18,23,28H,4-8,10,12-16H2,1-3H3/t23-,24+,25?/m1/s1; Key:LOYWOYCPSWPKFH-CSIQULDISA-N

Quadazocine (WIN-44,441) is an opioid antagonist of the benzomorphan family which is used in scientific research. It acts as a silent antagonist at all three of the major opioid receptors—μ, κ, and δ, but with a significant preference in affinity for the μ receptor and the κ_{2} subtype. As such, it has been touted as a "κ_{2}-selective" antagonist, though this is not entirely accurate on account of its similar affinity for the μ receptor. As would be expected, quadazocine reverses the effects (e.g., analgesia) of opioid agonists like morphine and fentanyl in animals.

== See also ==
- Dezocine
