= Prodiame =

Chemical compound

Clinical data
- Other names: 17β-((3-aminopropyl)amino)estradiol; 17β-[(3-Aminopropyl)amino]estra-1,3,5(10)-trien-3-ol; N-(3-Hydroxyestra-1,3,5(10)-triene-1,3-17beta)-1,3-propylenediamine

Identifiers
- IUPAC name: (8R,9S,13S,14S,17S)-17-(3-Aminopropylamino)-13-methyl-6,7,8,9,11,12,14,15,16,17-decahydrocyclopenta[a]phenanthren-3-ol
- CAS Number: 87189-13-7
- PubChem CID: 135893
- ChemSpider: 119680
- CompTox Dashboard (EPA): DTXSID001007396

Chemical and physical data
- Formula: C_{21}H_{32}N_{2}O
- Molar mass: 328.500 g·mol^{−1}
- 3D model (JSmol): Interactive image
- SMILES: C[C@]12CC[C@H]3[C@H]([C@@H]1CC[C@@H]2NCCCN)CCC4=C3C=CC(=C4)O
- InChI: InChI=1S/C21H32N2O/c1-21-10-9-17-16-6-4-15(24)13-14(16)3-5-18(17)19(21)7-8-20(21)23-12-2-11-22/h4,6,13,17-20,23-24H,2-3,5,7-12,22H2,1H3/t17-,18-,19+,20+,21+/m1/s1; Key:ZIKAQUBYTJAACW-MJCUULBUSA-N

Prodiame, also known as 17β-((3-aminopropyl)amino)estradiol, is a synthetic, steroidal estrogen and a 17β-aminoestrogen with anticoagulant effects that was first described in 1983 and was never marketed.
