= Moxazocine =

Chemical compound

Identifiers
- IUPAC name: (1S,9R,13S)-10-(cyclopropylmethyl)-13-methoxy-1-methyl-10-azatricyclo[7.3.1.0^{2,7}]trideca-2,4,6-trien-4-ol
- CAS Number: 58239-89-7
- ChemSpider: 16737008
- UNII: BNB57S7DWT
- CompTox Dashboard (EPA): DTXSID80866681

Chemical and physical data
- Formula: C_{18}H_{25}NO_{2}
- Molar mass: 287.403 g·mol^{−1}
- 3D model (JSmol): Interactive image
- SMILES: Oc1ccc2C[C@H]3N(CC[C@@](C)(c2c1)[C@@H]3OC)CC4CC4
- InChI: InChI=1S/C18H25NO2/c1-18-7-8-19(11-12-3-4-12)16(17(18)21-2)9-13-5-6-14(20)10-15(13)18/h5-6,10,12,16-17,20H,3-4,7-9,11H2,1-2H3/t16-,17-,18+/m1/s1; Key:IOZWXJXXVLARQC-KURKYZTESA-N

Moxazocine (BL-4566) is an opioid analgesic of the benzomorphan family which was never marketed. It acts as a partial agonist or mixed agonist/antagonist of the opioid receptors and binds preferentially to the κ-opioid receptor. Despite its failure to reach the market, clinical studies demonstrated moxazocine to be approximately 10x as potent by weight as morphine as an analgesic.

== Synthesis ==
Moxazocine synthesis:

Reduction of the carbonyl group in oxygenated benzomorphan 1 affords the corresponding alcohol (2). This intermediate is then N-demethylated by means of BrCN. Acylation with cyclopropylcarbonyl chloride gives the amide (3). The alcohol is then converted to the ether by treatment with MeI and base (4). Treatment with LiAlH_{4} serves to reduce the amide function. Cleavage of the phenolic ether by one of the standard schemes affords moxazocine (6).

== See also ==
- Benzomorphan
