= 2,6-Lutidine =

Names
- Preferred IUPAC name 2,6-Dimethylpyridine
- Other names Lutidine

Identifiers
CAS Number	108-48-5
3D model (JSmol)	Interactive image
Beilstein Reference	105690
ChEBI	CHEBI:32548
ChemSpider	13842613
ECHA InfoCard	100.003.262
EC Number	203-587-3
Gmelin Reference	2863
PubChem CID	7937
UNII	15FQ5D0T3P
UN number	2734
CompTox Dashboard (EPA)	DTXSID7051557
- InChI: InChI=1S/C7H9N/c1-6-4-3-5-7(2)8-6/h3-5H,1-2H3 Key: OISVCGZHLKNMSJ-UHFFFAOYSA-N
- SMILES: CC1=CC=CC(C)=N1

Properties
Chemical formula	C_{7}H_{9}N
Molar mass	107.153 g/mol
Appearance	colorless oily liquid
Density	0.9252
Melting point	−5.8 °C (21.6 °F; 267.3 K)
Boiling point	144 °C (291 °F; 417 K)
Solubility in water	27.2% at 45.3 °C
Acidity (pK_{a})	6.72
Magnetic susceptibility (χ)	−71.72×10^{−6} cm^{3}/mol

Hazards
NFPA 704 (fire diamond)	2 3 0
- Except where otherwise noted, data are given for materials in their standard state (at 25 °C [77 °F], 100 kPa). verify (what is ?) Infobox references

2,6-Lutidine is a natural heterocyclic aromatic organic compound with the formula (CH_{3})_{2}C_{5}H_{3}N. It is one of several dimethyl-substituted derivative of pyridine, all of which are referred to as lutidines. It is a colorless liquid with mildly basic properties and a pungent, noxious odor.

== Occurrence and production ==
It was first isolated from the basic fraction of coal tar and from bone oil.

A laboratory route involves condensation of ethyl acetoacetate, formaldehyde, and an ammonia source to give a bis(carboxy ester) of a 2,6-dimethyl-1,4-dihydropyridine, which, after hydrolysis, undergoes decarboxylation.

It is produced industrially by the reaction of formaldehyde, acetone, and ammonia.

== Uses ==
2,6-Lutidine has been evaluated for use as a food additive owing to its nutty aroma when present in solution at very low concentrations.

Due to the steric effects of the two methyl groups, 2,6-lutidine is less nucleophilic than pyridine. Protonation of lutidine gives lutidinium, [(CH_{3})_{2}C_{5}H_{3}NH]^{+}, salts of which are sometimes used as a weak acid because the conjugate base (2,6-lutidine) is so weakly coordinating. In a similar implementation, 2,6-lutidine is thus sometimes used in organic synthesis as a sterically hindered mild base. One of the most common uses for 2,6-lutidine is as a non-nucleophilic base in organic synthesis. It takes part in the formation of silyl ethers as shown in multiple studies.

Oxidation of 2,6-lutidine with air gives 2,6-diformylpyridine:

C_{5}H_{3}N(CH_{3})_{2} + 2 O_{2} → C_{5}H_{3}N(CHO)_{2} + 2 H_{2}O

2,6-Lutidine also finds application in the synthesis of Nifurpirinol [13411-16-0].

== Biodegradation ==
The biodegradation of pyridines proceeds via multiple pathways. Although pyridine is an excellent source of carbon, nitrogen, and energy for certain microorganisms, methylation significantly retards degradation of the pyridine ring. In soil, 2,6-lutidine is significantly more resistant to microbiological degradation than any of the picoline isomers or 2,4-lutidine. Estimated time for complete degradation was over 30 days.

== See also ==
- 3,5-Lutidine
- 2,4-Lutidine
- 2,6-Dimethylpiperidine
- 2,4,6-Trimethylpyridine (collidine)

== Toxicity ==
Like most alkylpyridines, the LD_{50} of 2,6-dimethylpyridine is modest, being 400 mg/kg (oral, rat).
