= 2,4-Lutidine =

Names
- Preferred IUPAC name 2,4-Dimethylpyridine
- Other names 2,4-Lutidine

Identifiers
CAS Number	108-47-4
3D model (JSmol)	Interactive image
ChemSpider	21132380
ECHA InfoCard	100.003.261
EC Number	203-586-8
PubChem CID	7936
UNII	83903UJ0WW
CompTox Dashboard (EPA)	DTXSID2051556
- InChI: InChI=1S/C7H9N/c1-6-3-4-8-7(2)5-6/h3-5H,1-2H3 Key: JYYNAJVZFGKDEQ-UHFFFAOYSA-N
- SMILES: CC1=CC(=NC=C1)C

Properties
Chemical formula	C_{7}H_{9}N
Molar mass	107.156 g·mol^{−1}
Appearance	Clear oily liquid
Density	0.9273 g/cm^{3}
Melting point	−64 °C (−83 °F; 209 K)
Boiling point	158.5 °C (317.3 °F; 431.6 K)
Magnetic susceptibility (χ)	−71.72×10^{−6} cm^{3}/mol

Hazards
- GHS labelling
Pictograms	(GHS02: Flammable) (GHS07: Exclamation mark)
Signal word	Warning
Hazard statements	H226, H302, H312, H332
Precautionary statements	P210, P233, P240, P241, P242, P243, P261, P264, P270, P271, P280, P301+P312, P302+P352, P303+P361+P353, P304+P312, P304+P340, P312, P322, P330, P363, P370+P378, P403+P235, P501
- Except where otherwise noted, data are given for materials in their standard state (at 25 °C [77 °F], 100 kPa). Infobox references

2,4-Lutidine is a heterocyclic organic compound with the formula (CH_{3})_{2}C_{5}H_{3}N. It is one of several dimethyl-substituted derivatives of pyridine, all of which are referred to as lutidines. It is a colorless liquid with mildly basic properties and a pungent, noxious odor. The compound has few uses.

It is produced industrially by extraction from coal tars.

== Biodegradation ==
The biodegradation of pyridines proceeds via multiple pathways. Although pyridine is an excellent source of carbon, nitrogen, and energy for certain microorganisms, methylation significantly retards degradation of the pyridine ring.

== Safety ==
The LD_{50} is 200 mg/kg (oral, rats).

== See also ==
- 2,6-Lutidine
- 3,5-Lutidine
