= Benzomorphan =

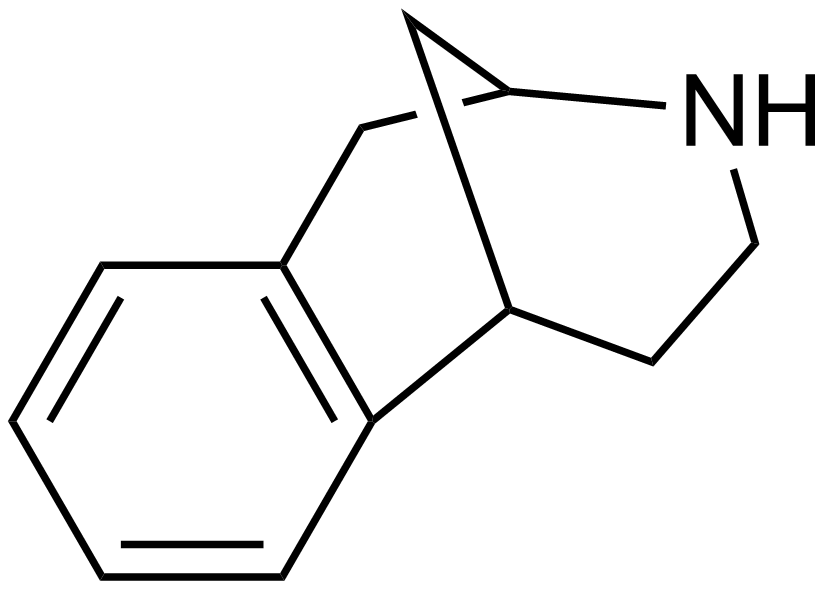

Names
- IUPAC name 6,7-Benzomorphan
- Other names: 1,2,3,4,5,6-Hexahydro-2,6-methano-3-benzazocine<; 10-Azatricyclo[7.3.1.0~2,7~]trideca-2,4,6-triene

Identifiers
CAS Number	575-19-9
3D model (JSmol)	Interactive image
ChemSpider	158637
PubChem CID	182394
UNII	A8J3S2MS1D
CompTox Dashboard (EPA)	DTXSID80982138
- InChI: InChI=1S/C12H15N/c1-2-4-12-9(3-1)7-11-8-10(12)5-6-13-11/h1-4,10-11,13H,5-8H2 Key: NSLKFRGZLUIUKO-UHFFFAOYSA-N; InChI=1/C12H15N/c1-2-4-12-9(3-1)7-11-8-10(12)5-6-13-11/h1-4,10-11,13H,5-8H2 Key: NSLKFRGZLUIUKO-UHFFFAOYAF
- SMILES: C1CNC2CC1C3=CC=CC=C3C2

Properties
Chemical formula	C_{12}H_{15}N
Molar mass	173.259 g·mol^{−1}
- Except where otherwise noted, data are given for materials in their standard state (at 25 °C [77 °F], 100 kPa). verify (what is ?) Infobox references

Benzomorphan is a chemical compound that is the base for a series of drugs which variably act on the sigma receptors and κ-opioid receptors, including the following compounds:

- 5,9-DEHB
- 8-CAC
- Alazocine
- Anazocine
- Bremazocine
- Butinazocine
- Carbazocine
- Cogazocine
- Cyclazocine
- Dezocine
- Eptazocine (Homobenzomorphan)
- Etazocine
- Ethylketocyclazocine
- Fluorophen
- Gemazocine
- Gpa-1657 [14578-59-7]
- GPA 1658 HCl salt: [26862-29-3]
- GPA-208
- GPA-3154 Fb: [35758-34-0] HCl salt: [35758-32-8]
- Ibazocine
- ID-1229 [56390-16-0]
- LP-1
- Ketazocine
- Metazocine
- Moxazocine
- Mr2266 [56649-76-4]
- MR-2034, MR-2033-CL [57236-85-8]
- Pentazocine
- Phenazocine
- Quadazocine
- Thiazocine
- Tonazocine
- Volazocine
- Zenazocine

Some of these agents are used as analgesics, including pentazocine, phenazocine, dezocine, and eptazocine.

== See also ==
- Benzazocine
- Azocine
- Morphinan
