= Morishita Station =

Morishita Station is the name of three train stations in Japan:

- Morishita Station (Aichi)
- Morishita Station (Fukuoka)
- Morishita Station (Tokyo)
