= Fluorophen =

Chemical compound

Clinical data
- ATC code: None

Identifiers
- IUPAC name: (1R,9S,13R)-10-[2-(4-fluorophenyl)ethyl]-1,13-dimethyl-10-azatricyclo[7.3.1.0^{2,7}]trideca-2,4,6-trien-4-ol
- CAS Number: 86495-14-9
- PubChem CID: 3036297
- ChemSpider: 2300351
- CompTox Dashboard (EPA): DTXSID501006862

Chemical and physical data
- Formula: C_{22}H_{26}FNO
- Molar mass: 339.454 g·mol^{−1}
- 3D model (JSmol): Interactive image
- SMILES: Fc1ccc(cc1)CCN4[C@H]3Cc2c(cc(O)cc2)[C@@]([C@H]3C)(CC4)C
- InChI: InChI=1S/C22H26FNO/c1-15-21-13-17-5-8-19(25)14-20(17)22(15,2)10-12-24(21)11-9-16-3-6-18(23)7-4-16/h3-8,14-15,21,25H,9-13H2,1-2H3/t15-,21-,22+/m0/s1; Key:PUPFATUGTIQBQA-UZQPLGKSSA-N

Fluorophen, or fluorofen, is a fluorinated analogue of phenazocine, an opioid drug of the benzomorphan group, which was developed as a radioligand for the purpose of labeling opioid receptors during PET scans (with ^{18}F). Unlike most other benzomorphan derivatives, fluorophen acts as a full agonist of the opioid receptors with preferential affinity for the μ-opioid receptor (approximately 6x that of morphine), similar but slightly lower affinity for the δ-opioid receptor (equipotent to [D-Ala^{2}, D-Leu^{5}]enkephalin), and very low affinity for the κ-opioid receptor.
