= Prolame =

Chemical compound

Clinical data
- Other names: 17β-((3-Hydroxypropyl)amino)estradiol; 17β-[(3-Hydroxypropyl)amino]estra-1,3,5(10)-trien-3-ol

Identifiers
- IUPAC name: (8R,9S,13S,14S,17S)-17-(3-Hydroxypropylamino)-13-methyl-6,7,8,9,11,12,14,15,16,17-decahydrocyclopenta[a]phenanthren-3-ol
- CAS Number: 99876-41-2
- PubChem CID: 127441
- ChemSpider: 113081
- UNII: O0UN4KN1EV
- CompTox Dashboard (EPA): DTXSID40912431

Chemical and physical data
- Formula: C_{21}H_{31}NO_{2}
- Molar mass: 329.484 g·mol^{−1}
- 3D model (JSmol): Interactive image
- SMILES: C[C@]12CC[C@H]3[C@H]([C@@H]1CC[C@@H]2NCCCO)CCC4=C3C=CC(=C4)O
- InChI: InChI=1S/C21H31NO2/c1-21-10-9-17-16-6-4-15(24)13-14(16)3-5-18(17)19(21)7-8-20(21)22-11-2-12-23/h4,6,13,17-20,22-24H,2-3,5,7-12H2,1H3/t17-,18-,19+,20+,21+/m1/s1; Key:FRZIQVNLLGECCX-MJCUULBUSA-N

Prolame, also known as 17β-((3-hydroxypropyl)amino)estradiol, is a synthetic, steroidal estrogen and a 17β-aminoestrogen with anticoagulant effects that was first described in 1985 but was never marketed.
