= Takeshi Morishita =

Takeshi Morishita (森下 健, Morishita Takeshi; born July 25, 1932) is a Japanese physician and scholar on cardiological imaging in Japan, an ex-professor at Toho University, school of medicine, Tokyo, and a councillor of the university.

Born in Shizuoka Prefecture, Japan in 1932, he graduated from Toho University in 1962. In 1979, he became vice-director of Omori Hospital attached to Toho University. After retiring as a professor in 1998, he served as director of Ofuna Chūō General Hospital in Kamakura until March 2006. He became director of Nukada Memorial Hospital in Kamakura in June 2006.
