= Benzazocine =

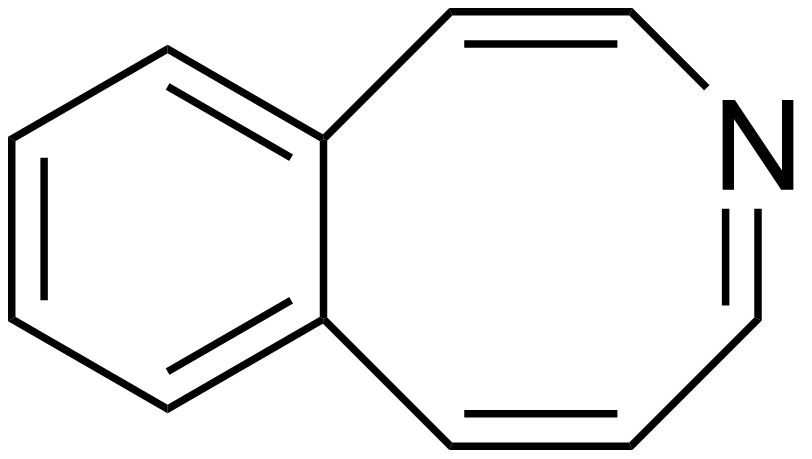

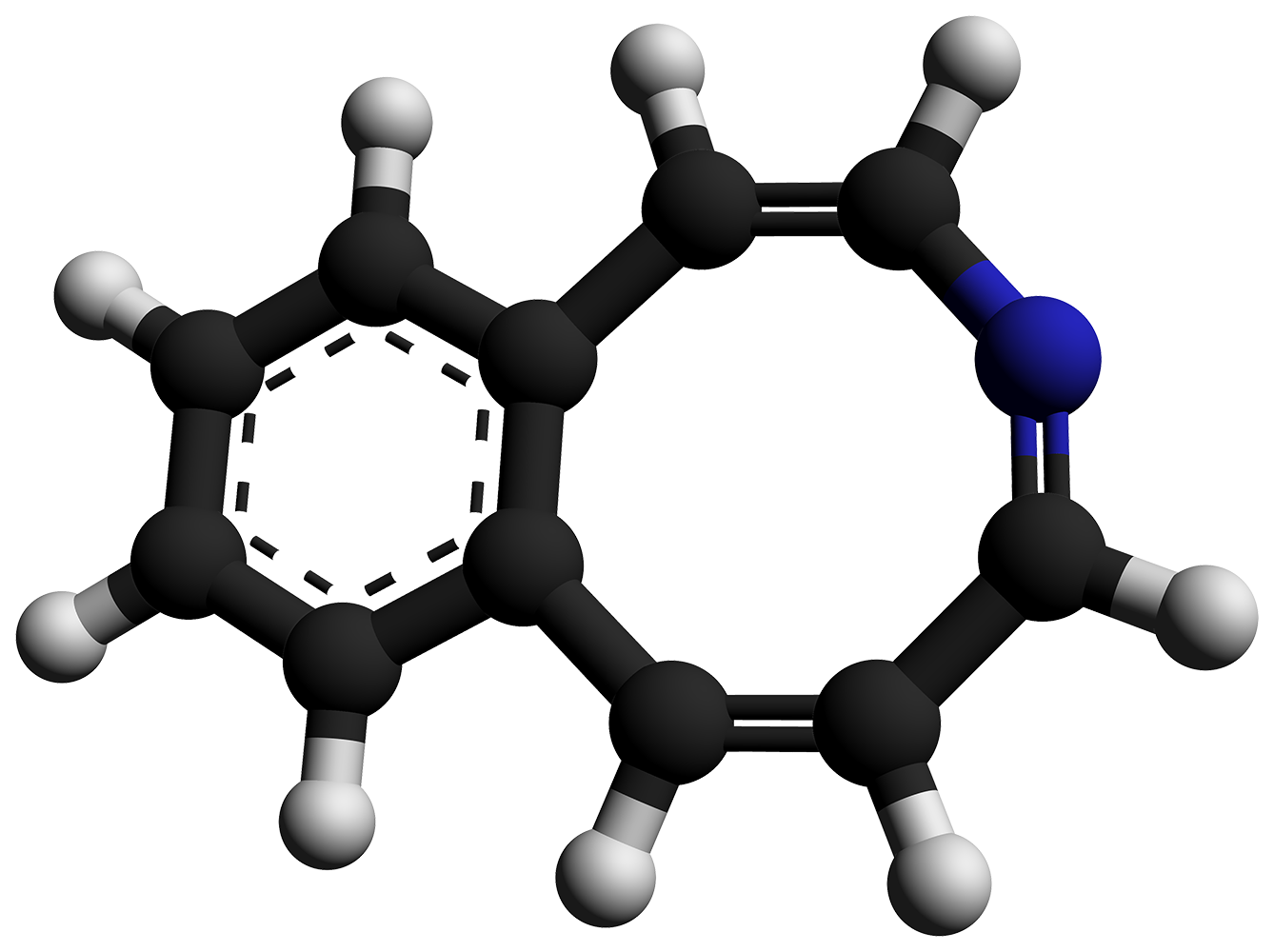

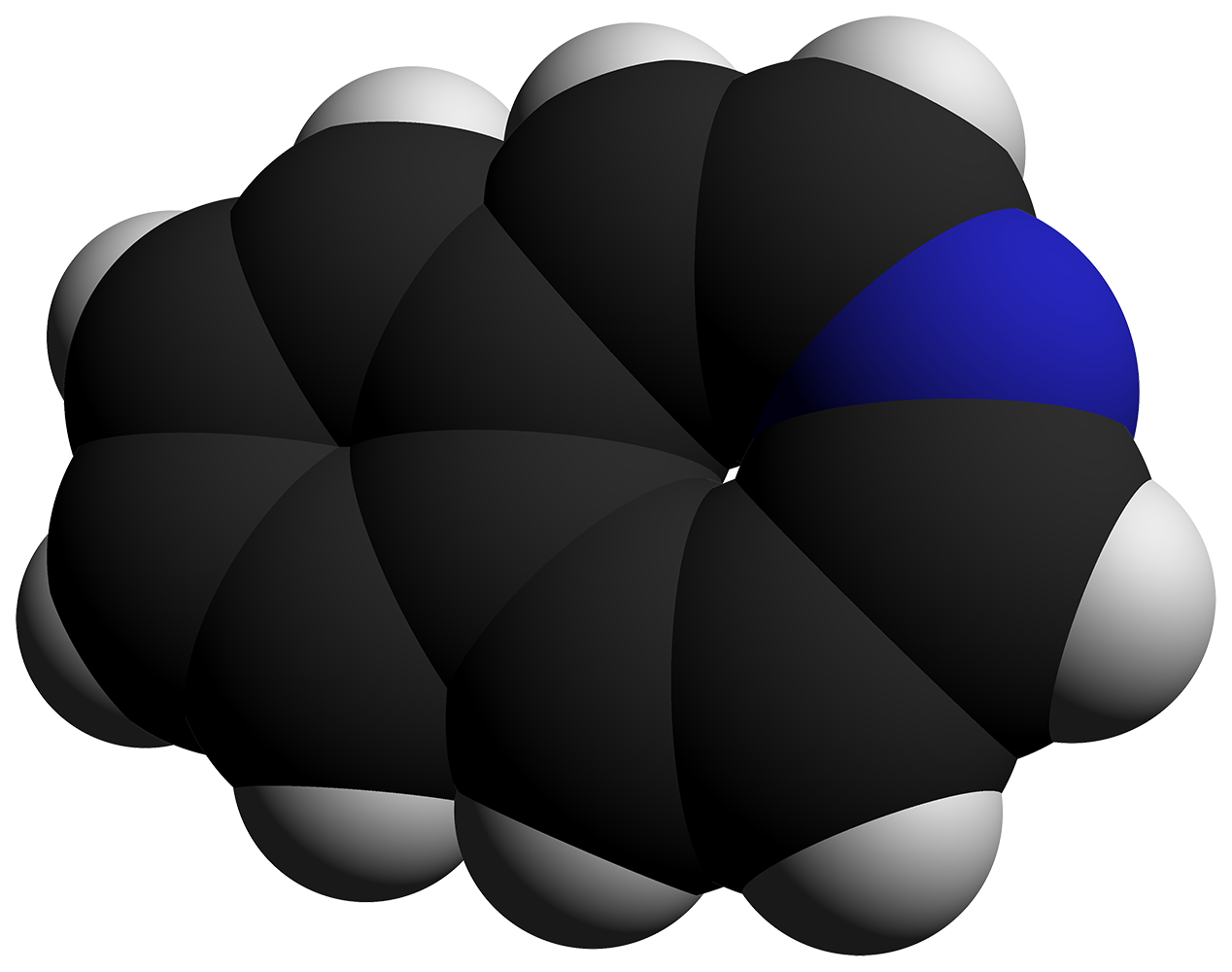

Names
- Preferred IUPAC name (1Z,3Z,5Z)-3-Benzazocine
- Other names 3-Benzoazocine

Identifiers
CAS Number	265-50-9
3D model (JSmol)	Interactive image
ChemSpider	14453507
PubChem CID	23636835
UNII	7YM727TA2C
CompTox Dashboard (EPA)	DTXSID50635285
- InChI: InChI=1S/C11H9N/c1-2-5-11-7-9-12-8-3-6-10(11)4-1/h1-9H/b6-3-,8-3-,9-7-,10-6-,11-7-,12-8-,12-9- Key: DMGLUDJTJZXMMG-SLVRTNKRSA-N; InChI=1S/C11H9N/c1-2-5-11-7-9-12-8-3-6-10(11)4-1/h1-9H/b6-3-,8-3-,9-7-,10-6-,11-7-,12-8-,12-9-
- SMILES: c1cccc2\C=C/N=C\C=C/c12

Properties
Chemical formula	C_{11}H_{9}N
Molar mass	155.200 g·mol^{−1}
- Except where otherwise noted, data are given for materials in their standard state (at 25 °C [77 °F], 100 kPa). verify (what is ?) Infobox references

3-Benzazocine, also known as 3-benzoazocine, is a chemical compound. It consists of a benzene ring bound to an azocine ring. A related compound is benzomorphan.

== See also ==
- Azocine
- Benzomorphan
