= 8-OH-PBZI =

Chemical compound

Clinical data
- ATC code: none

Identifiers
- IUPAC name: (3aS,9bR)-3-propyl-1,2,3a,4,5,9b-hexahydrobenzo[e]indol-8-ol
- CAS Number: 251327-33-0
- PubChem CID: 10353845
- ChemSpider: 8529297
- UNII: B8GYQ9JV5F
- CompTox Dashboard (EPA): DTXSID501028808

Chemical and physical data
- Formula: C_{15}H_{21}NO
- Molar mass: 231.339 g·mol^{−1}
- 3D model (JSmol): Interactive image
- SMILES: CCCN1CC[C@H]2[C@@H]1CCC3=C2C=C(C=C3)O
- InChI: InChI=1S/C15H21NO/c1-2-8-16-9-7-13-14-10-12(17)5-3-11(14)4-6-15(13)16/h3,5,10,13,15,17H,2,4,6-9H2,1H3/t13-,15+/m1/s1; Key:LJDRQPOQHHOXHM-HIFRSBDPSA-N

8-OH-PBZI is a drug used in scientific research which acts as a potent and selective agonist for the dopamine D_{3} receptor.
