= Pentolame =

Chemical compound

Clinical data
- Other names: 17β-((5-Hydroxypentyl)amino)estradiol; 17β-[(5-Hydroxypentyl)amino]estra-1,3,5(10)-trien-3-ol

Identifiers
- IUPAC name: (8R,9S,13S,14S,17S)-17-(5-Hydroxypentylamino)-13-methyl-6,7,8,9,11,12,14,15,16,17-decahydrocyclopenta[a]phenanthren-3-ol
- CAS Number: 150748-24-6
- PubChem CID: 10473548
- ChemSpider: 8648959
- CompTox Dashboard (EPA): DTXSID801188752

Chemical and physical data
- Formula: C_{23}H_{35}NO_{2}
- Molar mass: 357.538 g·mol^{−1}
- 3D model (JSmol): Interactive image
- SMILES: C[C@]12CC[C@H]3[C@H]([C@@H]1CC[C@@H]2NCCCCCO)CCC4=C3C=CC(=C4)O
- InChI: InChI=1S/C23H35NO2/c1-23-12-11-19-18-8-6-17(26)15-16(18)5-7-20(19)21(23)9-10-22(23)24-13-3-2-4-14-25/h6,8,15,19-22,24-26H,2-5,7,9-14H2,1H3/t19-,20-,21+,22+,23+/m1/s1; Key:CYIRNKIFROUCMA-VROINQGHSA-N

Pentolame, also known as 17β-((5-hydroxypentyl)amino)estradiol is a synthetic, steroidal estrogen and a 17β-aminoestrogen with anticoagulant effects that was first described in 1993 and was never marketed.
