= 8-Carboxamidocyclazocine =

Opioid agonist drug

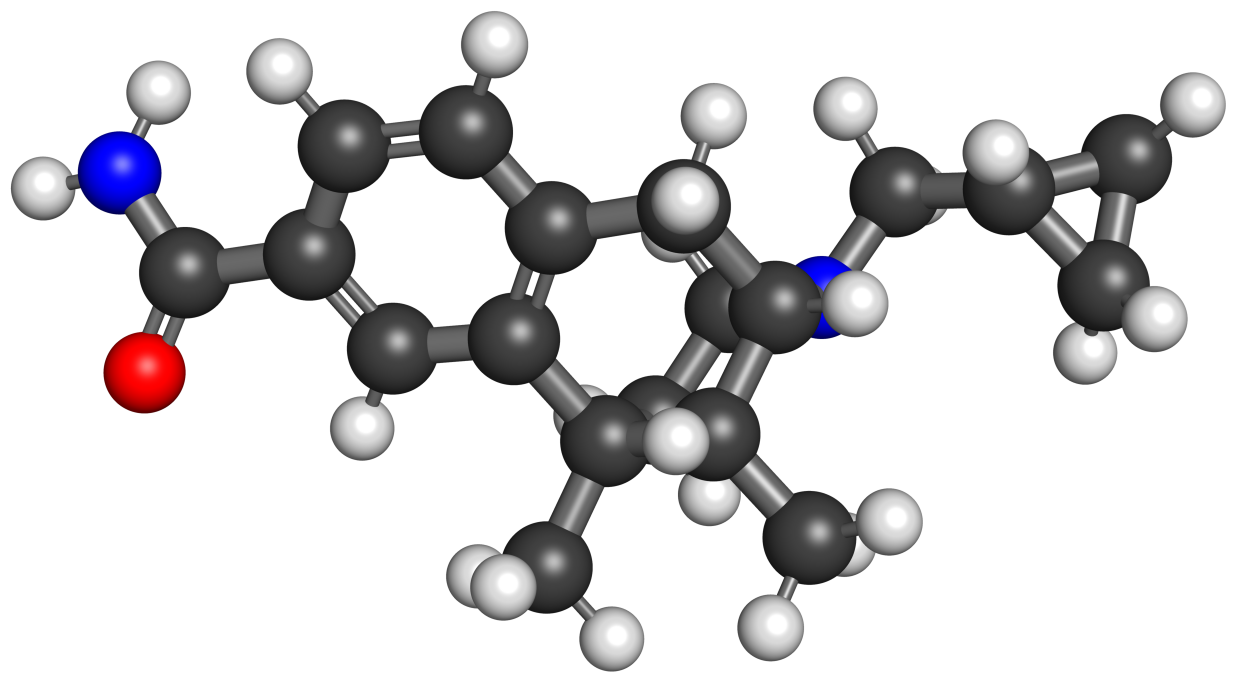

Identifiers
- IUPAC name: (1S,10R,13R)-10-(Cyclopropylmethyl)-1,13-dimethyl-10-azatricyclo[7.3.1.0^{2,7}]trideca-2(7),3,5-triene-4-carboxamide
- CAS Number: 911207-68-6
- PubChem CID: 10086063
- ChemSpider: 30845204
- CompTox Dashboard (EPA): DTXSID40726979

Chemical and physical data
- Formula: C_{19}H_{26}N_{2}O
- Molar mass: 298.430 g·mol^{−1}
- 3D model (JSmol): Interactive image
- SMILES: C[C@H]1[C@H]2Cc3ccc(cc3[C@]1(CCN2CC4CC4)C)C(=O)N
- InChI: InChI=1S/C19H26N2O/c1-12-17-10-14-5-6-15(18(20)22)9-16(14)19(12,2)7-8-21(17)11-13-3-4-13/h5-6,9,12-13,17H,3-4,7-8,10-11H2,1-2H3,(H2,20,22)/t12-,17+,19-/m0/s1; Key:FAVQVALXVLMHLE-WILYLXEWSA-N

8-Carboxamidocyclazocine (8-CAC) is an opioid analgesic drug related to cyclazocine, discovered by medicinal chemist Mark P. Wentland and co-workers in Cogswell Laboratory at Rensselaer Polytechnic Institute. Similarly to cyclazocine, 8-CAC acts as an agonist at both the μ- and κ-opioid receptors, but has a much longer duration of action than cyclazocine, and does not have μ antagonist activity. Unexpectedly, it was discovered that the phenolic hydroxyl group of cyclazocine could be replaced by a carboxamido group with only slight loss of potency at opioid receptors, and this discovery has subsequently been used to develop many novel opioid derivatives where the phenolic hydroxy group has been replaced by either carboxamide or a variety of larger groups. Due to their strong κ-opioid agonist activity, these drugs are not suited for use as analgesics in humans, but have instead been researched as potential drugs for the treatment of cocaine addiction.

== See also ==
- Tianeptine – an atypical, selective μ-opioid receptor (MOR) full-agonist licensed for major depression since 1989.
- Samidorphan – an opioid preferring the MOR, which is under development for major depression.
