= Azocane =

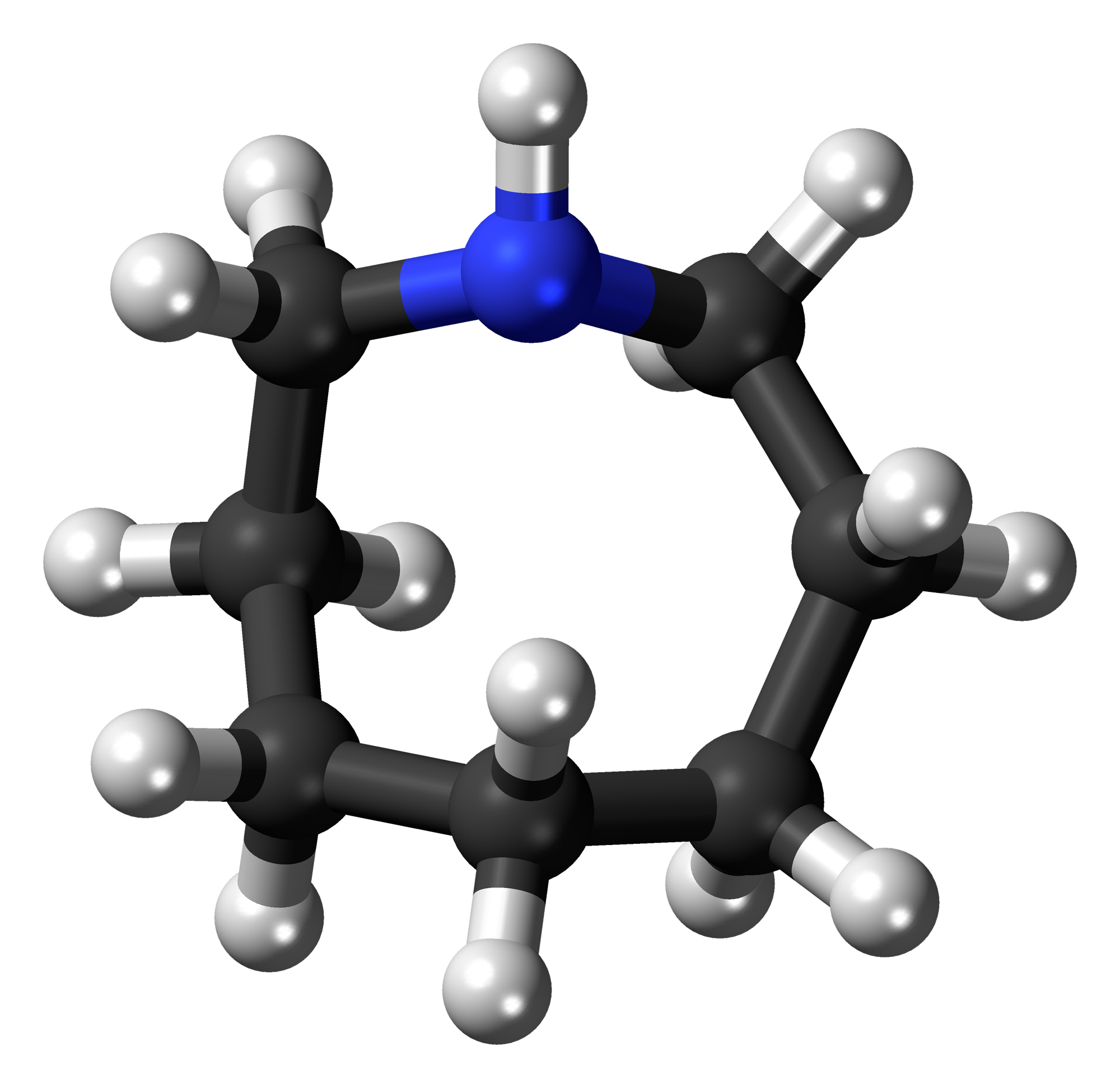

Names
- Preferred IUPAC name Azocane
- Other names Azacyclooctane; Heptamethyleneimine; Octahydroazocine; Perhydroazocine

Identifiers
CAS Number	1121-92-2
3D model (JSmol)	Interactive image
ChEBI	CHEBI:38792
ChemSpider	13638
ECHA InfoCard	100.013.039
PubChem CID	14276
UNII	ZC49N9GJJ2
CompTox Dashboard (EPA)	DTXSID2020680
- InChI: InChI=1S/C7H15N/c1-2-4-6-8-7-5-3-1/h8H,1-7H2 Key: QXNDZONIWRINJR-UHFFFAOYSA-N; InChI=1/C7H15N/c1-2-4-6-8-7-5-3-1/h8H,1-7H2 Key: QXNDZONIWRINJR-UHFFFAOYAE
- SMILES: N1CCCCCCC1

Properties
Chemical formula	C_{7}H_{15}N
Molar mass	113.204 g·mol^{−1}
Density	0.896 g/mL
Boiling point	51 to 53 °C (124 to 127 °F; 324 to 326 K) (15 mmHg)
- Except where otherwise noted, data are given for materials in their standard state (at 25 °C [77 °F], 100 kPa). verify (what is ?) Infobox references

Azocane is a heterocyclic organic compound with the molecular formula C_{7}H_{15}N. It consists of a saturated eight-membered ring having seven carbon atoms and one nitrogen atom attached to a single hydrogen atom. The fully unsaturated analog of azocane is azocine.

Although azocane has limited uses, it is used in the preparation of guanethidine and trocimine.
