= 3,5-Lutidine =

Names
- Preferred IUPAC name 3,5-Dimethylpyridine
- Other names 3,5-Lutidine

Identifiers
CAS Number	591-22-0
3D model (JSmol)	Interactive image
Beilstein Reference	105682
ChemSpider	11077
ECHA InfoCard	100.008.827
EC Number	209-708-6
PubChem CID	11565
UNII	6Q4YPZ045V
CompTox Dashboard (EPA)	DTXSID5052254
- InChI: InChI=1S/C7H9N/c1-6-3-7(2)5-8-4-6/h3-5H,1-2H3 Key: HWWYDZCSSYKIAD-UHFFFAOYSA-N
- SMILES: CC1=CC(=CN=C1)C

Properties
Chemical formula	C_{7}H_{9}N
Molar mass	107.156 g·mol^{−1}
Appearance	oily liquid
Density	0.944 g/cm^{3}
Melting point	−6.5 °C (20.3 °F; 266.6 K)
Boiling point	171.9 °C (341.4 °F; 445.0 K)
Acidity (pK_{a})	6.15
Magnetic susceptibility (χ)	−71.72×10^{−6} cm^{3}/mol

Hazards
- GHS labelling
Pictograms	(GHS02: Flammable) (GHS05: Corrosive) (GHS06: Toxic) (GHS07: Exclamation mark)
Signal word	Danger
Hazard statements	H226, H301, H302, H311, H312, H314, H315, H331, H332, H335
Precautionary statements	P210, P233, P240, P241, P242, P243, P260, P264, P270, P271, P280, P301+P310, P301+P312, P301+P330+P331, P302+P352, P303+P361+P353, P304+P312, P304+P340, P305+P351+P338, P310, P311, P312, P321, P322, P330, P332+P313, P361, P362, P363, P370+P378, P403+P233, P403+P235, P405, P501
- Except where otherwise noted, data are given for materials in their standard state (at 25 °C [77 °F], 100 kPa). Infobox references

3,5-Lutidine is a heterocyclic organic compound with the formula (CH_{3})_{2}C_{5}H_{3}N. It is one of several dimethyl-substituted derivatives of pyridine, all of which are referred to as lutidines. It is a colorless liquid with mildly basic properties and a pungent odor. The compound is a precursor to the drug omeprazole.

3,5-Lutidine is produced industrially by condensation of propionaldehyde, ammonia, and formaldehyde:

2 CH_{2}=CHCHO + CH_{2}O + NH_{3} → (CH_{3})_{2}C_{5}H_{3}N + 2 H_{2}O

== Biodegradation ==
The biodegradation of pyridines proceeds via multiple pathways. Although pyridine is an excellent source of carbon, nitrogen, and energy for certain microorganisms, methylation significantly retards degradation of the pyridine ring.

== Safety ==
The LD_{50} is 200 mg/kg (oral, rats).

== See also ==
- 2,6-Lutidine
- 2,4-Lutidine
