= Volazocine =

Chemical compound

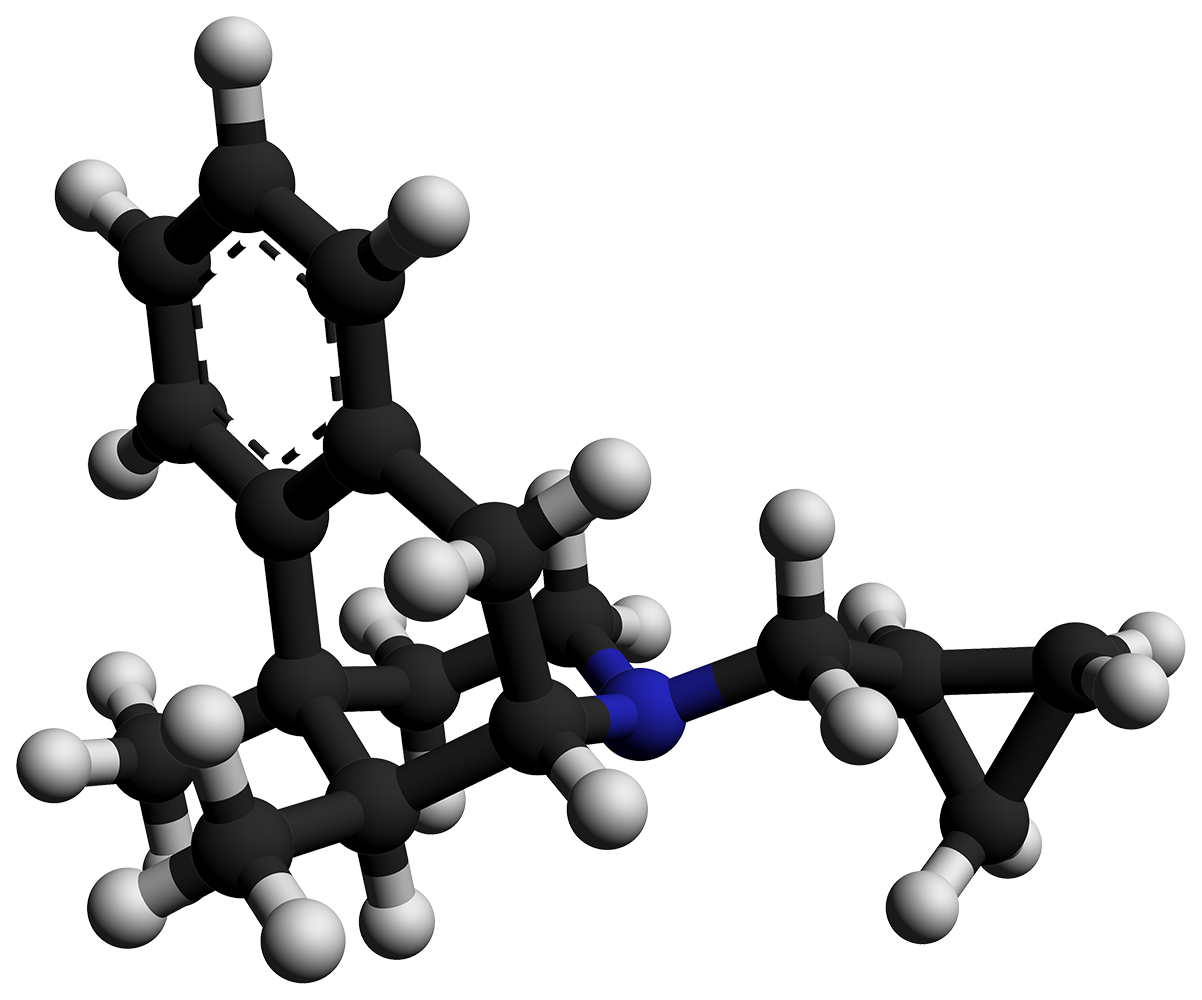

Clinical data
- ATC code: None

Identifiers
- IUPAC name: 3-(Cyclopropylmethyl)-6,11-dimethyl-1,2,3,4,5,6-hexahydro-2,6-methano-3-benzazocine
- CAS Number: 15686-68-7
- PubChem CID: 27446
- ChemSpider: 25540
- UNII: 6Z47B07H2H
- CompTox Dashboard (EPA): DTXSID30864617

Chemical and physical data
- Formula: C_{18}H_{25}N
- Molar mass: 255.405 g·mol^{−1}
- 3D model (JSmol): Interactive image
- SMILES: c12c(cccc1)CC3N(CCC2(C3C)C)CC4CC4
- InChI: InChI=1S/C18H25N/c1-13-17-11-15-5-3-4-6-16(15)18(13,2)9-10-19(17)12-14-7-8-14/h3-6,13-14,17H,7-12H2,1-2H3; Key:SVKVWRTVTPUQBY-UHFFFAOYSA-N

Volazocine is an opioid analgesic of the benzomorphan class which was never marketed.

== Synthesis ==
Volazocine synthesis:N. F. Albertson, U.S. patent 3,382,249 (1968).

== See also ==
- Ketazocine
- Cyclazocine
