= Aminoestradiol =

Chemical compound

Clinical data
- Other names: AE_{2}; 17βAE_{2}; 17β-Aminoestra-1,3,5(10)-trien-3-ol; 3-Hydroxy-17β-aminoestra-1,3,5(10)-triene

Identifiers
- IUPAC name: (8R,9S,13S,14S,17S)-17-Amino-13-methyl-6,7,8,9,11,12,14,15,16,17-decahydrocyclopenta[a]phenanthren-3-ol
- CAS Number: 20989-33-7
- PubChem CID: 11231075
- ChemSpider: 9406123
- UNII: 566D62CJB8
- CompTox Dashboard (EPA): DTXSID401337012

Chemical and physical data
- Formula: C_{18}H_{25}NO
- Molar mass: 271.404 g·mol^{−1}
- 3D model (JSmol): Interactive image
- SMILES: C[C@]12CC[C@H]3[C@H]([C@@H]1CC[C@@H]2N)CCC4=C3C=CC(=C4)O
- InChI: InChI=1S/C18H25NO/c1-18-9-8-14-13-5-3-12(20)10-11(13)2-4-15(14)16(18)6-7-17(18)19/h3,5,10,14-17,20H,2,4,6-9,19H2,1H3/t14-,15-,16+,17+,18+/m1/s1; Key:VPONVJPFULJPAN-ZBRFXRBCSA-N

Aminoestradiol (AE_{2}), also known as 17β-aminoestradiol (17βAE_{2}) or as 17β-aminoestra-1,3,5(10)-trien-3-ol, is a synthetic, steroidal estrogen and a 17β-aminoestrogen with anticoagulant effects that was never marketed. It is an analogue of estradiol in which the C17β hydroxyl group has been replaced with an amine group. AE_{2} has profoundly reduced estrogenic potency compared to estradiol; its EC_{50} for activation of the ERα was found to be 1.82 μM, whereas that of estradiol was 2.14 nM (relative potency 0.12 for AE_{2} versus 100 for estradiol, or roughly a 1,000-fold difference). It binds with low relative affinity to both the ERα and ERβ and has estrogenic activity that is greatly mediated through the ERβ and to a lesser extent through the ERα.
