= 3,5-Dimethylpiperidine =

- Structure of 3,5-dimethylpiperidine

Names
- Preferred IUPAC name 3,5-Dimethylpiperidine
- Other names 3,5-Lupetidine

Identifiers
| CAS Number | 35794-11-7 |
| 3D model (JSmol) | Interactive image |
| ChemSpider | 105689 |
| ECHA InfoCard | 100.047.922 |
| EC Number | 252-730-6 |
| PubChem CID | 118259 |
| CompTox Dashboard (EPA) | DTXSID80865790 |
- InChI: InChI=1S/C7H15N/c1-6-3-7(2)5-8-4-6/h6-8H,3-5H2,1-2H3 Key: IDWRJRPUIXRFRX-UHFFFAOYSA-N
- SMILES: CC1CC(CNC1)C

Properties
| Chemical formula | C_{7}H_{15}N |
| Molar mass | 113.204 g·mol^{−1} |
| Appearance | Colorless liquid |
| Density | 0.853 g/mL (mixture) |
| Boiling point | 144 °C (291 °F; 417 K) |
| Solubility in water | Low |
| Solubility in other solvents | Most organic solvents |
| Refractive index (n_{D}) | 1.4454 |

Hazards
- Occupational safety and health (OHS/OSH)
| Main hazards | Flammable |
- GHS labelling
| Pictograms | (GHS02: Flammable) (GHS07: Exclamation mark) |
| Signal word | Warning |
| Hazard statements | H226, H315, H319, H335 |
| Precautionary statements | P210, P233, P240, P241, P242, P243, P261, P264, P271, P280, P302+P352, P303+P361+P353, P304+P340, P305+P351+P338, P312, P321, P332+P313, P337+P313, P362, P370+P378, P403+P233, P403+P235, P405, P501 |
| Flash point | 33 °C (91 °F; 306 K) |

Related compounds
| Related compounds | 2,6-Dimethylpiperidine; Piperidine |
- Except where otherwise noted, data are given for materials in their standard state (at 25 °C [77 °F], 100 kPa). verify (what is ?) Infobox references

3,5-Dimethylpiperidines are chemical compounds with the formula C_{5}H_{8}(CH_{3})_{2}NH. Two diastereomers exist: the achiral R,S isomer and the chiral R,R/S,S enantiomeric pair. 3,5-Dimethylpiperidine is a precursor to tibric acid.

The compound is typically prepared by hydrogenation of 3,5-dimethylpyridine. Both diastereomers also arise from the reduction of 3,5-dimethylpyridine with lithium triethylborohydride.
