= Tonazocine =

Chemical compound

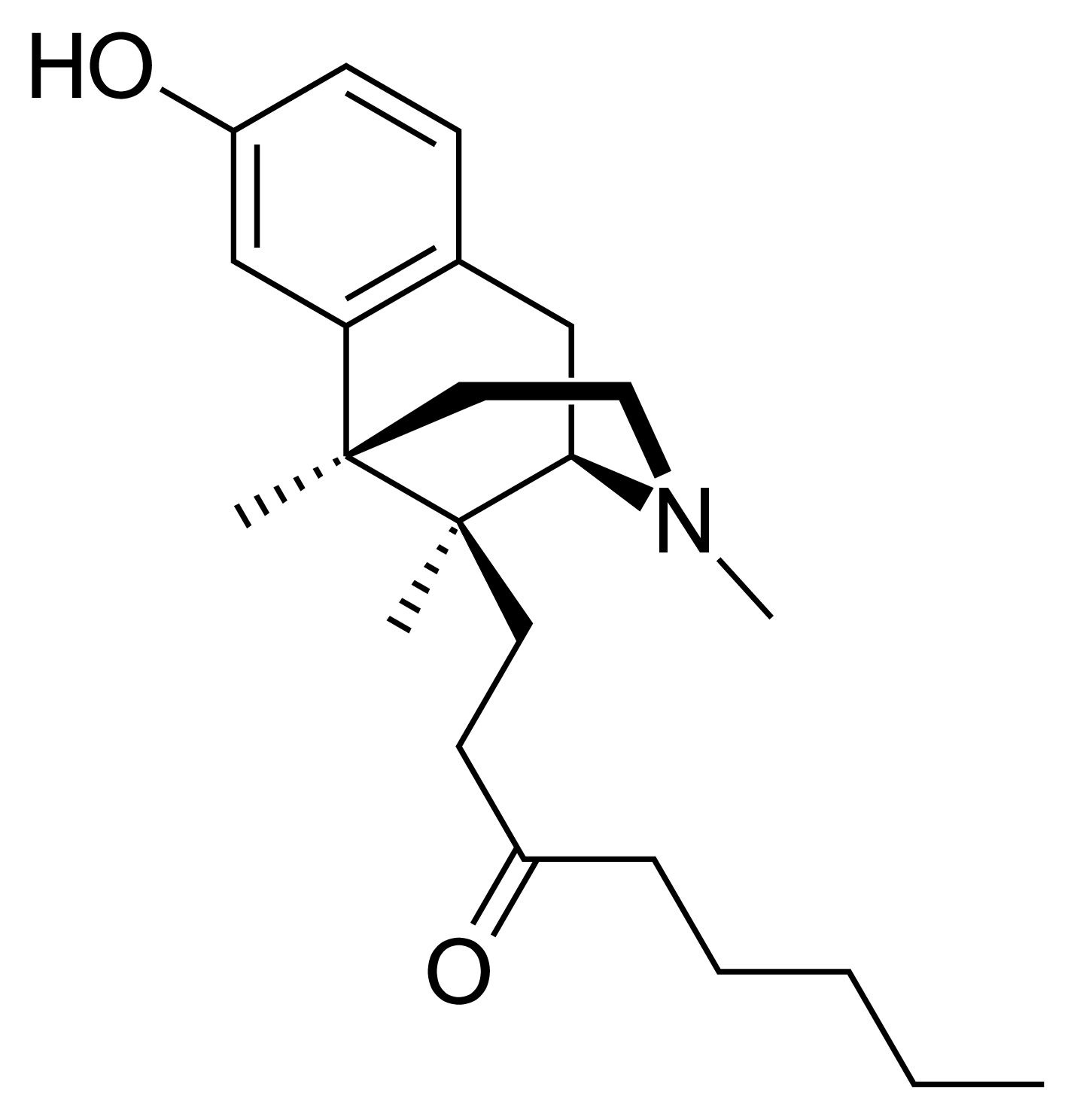

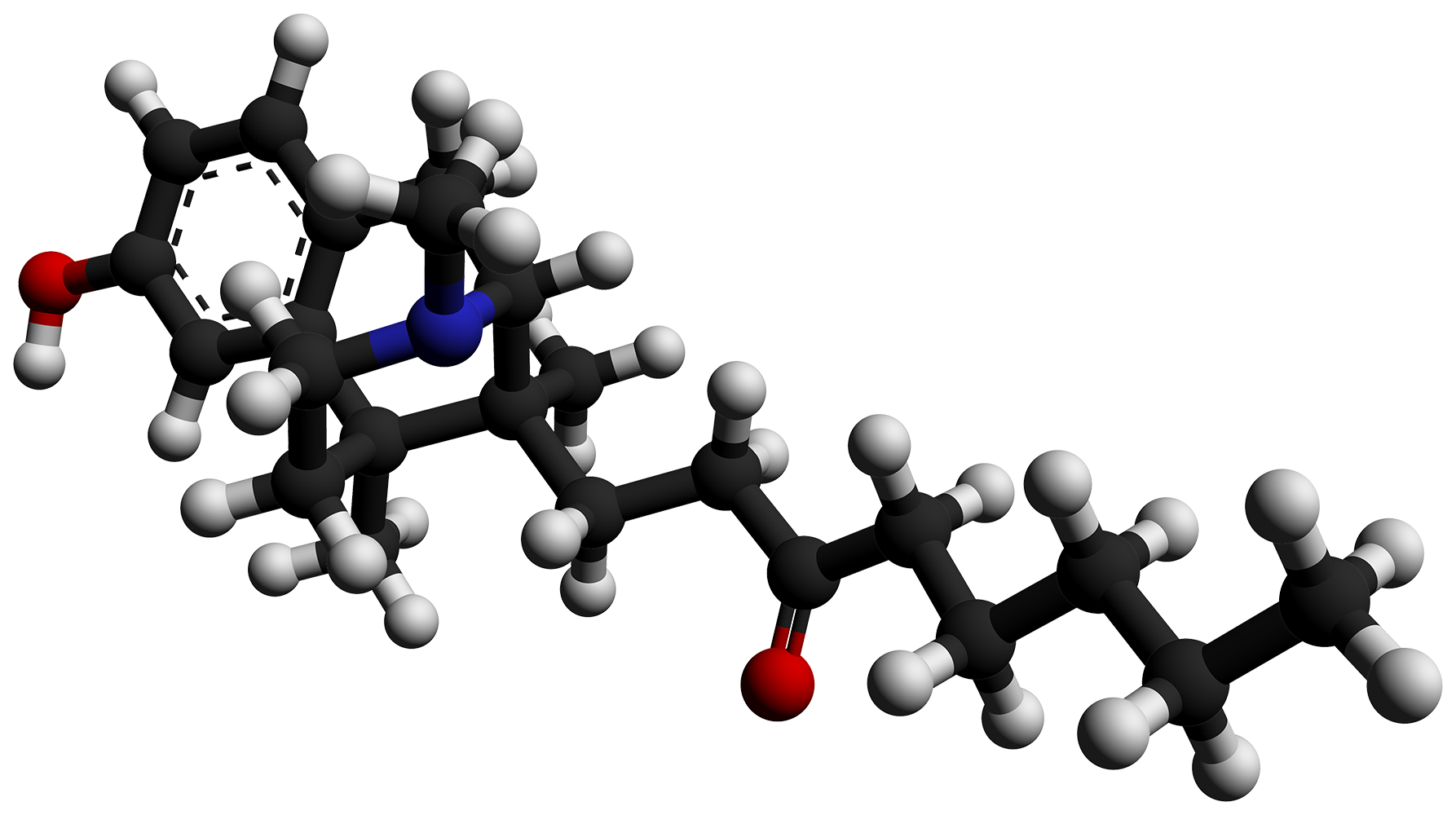

Clinical data
- ATC code: None

Legal status
- Legal status: In general: non-regulated

Identifiers
- IUPAC name: 1-[(2S,6R,11S)-8-hydroxy-3,6,11-trimethyl-1,2,3,4,5,6-hexahydro-2,6-methano-3-benzazocin-11-yl]octan-3-one
- CAS Number: 71461-18-2
- PubChem CID: 72177
- ChemSpider: 65150
- UNII: J356A16LLK

Chemical and physical data
- Formula: C_{23}H_{35}NO_{2}
- Molar mass: 357.538 g·mol^{−1}
- 3D model (JSmol): Interactive image
- SMILES: O=C(CCCCC)CC[C@@]3([C@H]2N(CC[C@@]3(c1c(ccc(O)c1)C2)C)C)C
- InChI: InChI=1S/C23H35NO2/c1-5-6-7-8-18(25)11-12-23(3)21-15-17-9-10-19(26)16-20(17)22(23,2)13-14-24(21)4/h9-10,16,21,26H,5-8,11-15H2,1-4H3/t21-,22+,23+/m0/s1; Key:UDNUCVYCLQJJBY-YTFSRNRJSA-N

Tonazocine (WIN-42,156) is an opioid analgesic of the benzomorphan family which made it to phase II clinical trials for the treatment of postoperative pain, but development was apparently ceased and ultimately it was never marketed. Tonazocine is a partial agonist at both the mu-opioid and delta-opioid receptors, but acting more like an antagonist at the former and more like an agonist at the latter. It lacks most of the side effects of other opioids such as adverse effects on the cardiovascular system and respiratory depression, but it can cause sedation (although to a lesser degree of typical opioids), and in some patients it may induce hallucinations (probably via binding to and activating the κ-opioid receptor).

== See also ==
- Zenazocine
