= Phenazocine =

Opioid analgesic

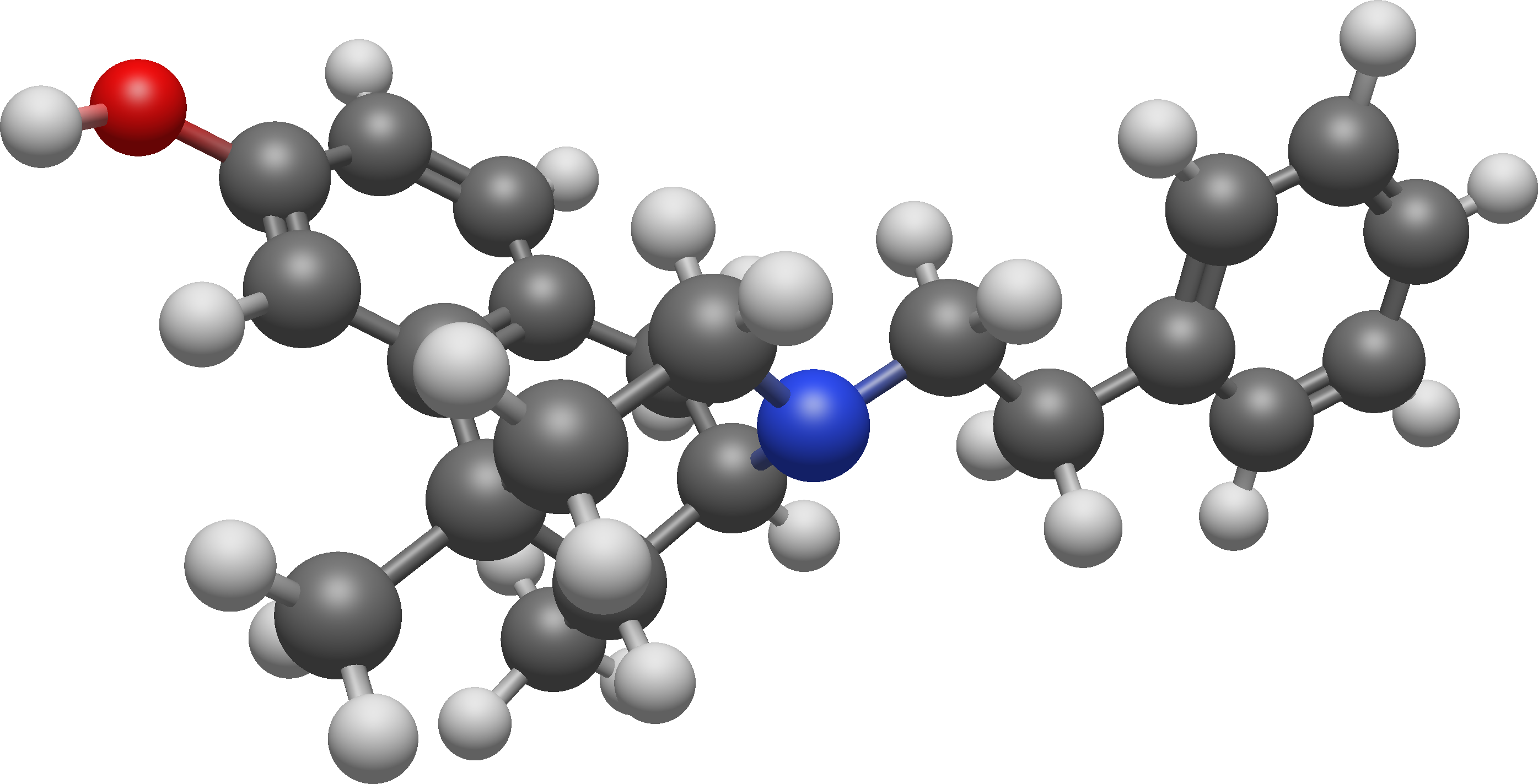

Clinical data
- Other names: Fenazocina, Phenazocinum, DEA No. 9715
- Routes of administration: Oral
- Drug class: κ-Opioid receptor agonist; μ-Opioid receptor agonist–antagonist; Opioid analgesic; Hallucinogen
- ATC code: N02AD02 (WHO)

Legal status
- Legal status: AU: S9 (Prohibited substance); BR: Class A1 (Narcotic drugs); CA: Schedule I; DE: Anlage I (Authorized scientific use only); UK: Class A Withdrawn; US: Schedule II

Identifiers
- IUPAC name: (2R,6R,11R)-6,11-Dimethyl-3-(2-phenylethyl)-1,2,3,4,5,6-hexahydro-2,6-methano-3-benzazocin-8-ol
- CAS Number: 58073-76-0
- PubChem CID: 14707
- ChemSpider: 391631
- UNII: J0ND6N0AQC
- KEGG: C11790
- ChEMBL: ChEMBL46399
- CompTox Dashboard (EPA): DTXSID30110040
- ECHA InfoCard: 100.004.397

Chemical and physical data
- Formula: C_{22}H_{27}NO
- Molar mass: 321.464 g·mol^{−1}
- 3D model (JSmol): Interactive image
- SMILES: C[C@H]1[C@H]2Cc3ccc(cc3[C@@]1(CCN2CCc4ccccc4)C)O
- InChI: InChI=1S/C22H27NO/c1-16-21-14-18-8-9-19(24)15-20(18)22(16,2)11-13-23(21)12-10-17-6-4-3-5-7-17/h3-9,15-16,21,24H,10-14H2,1-2H3/t16-,21+,22+/m0/s1; Key:ZQHYKVKNPWDQSL-KNXBSLHKSA-N

Phenazocine (brand names Prinadol, Narphen) is an opioid analgesic drug, which is related to pentazocine and has a similar profile of effects.

Effects of phenazocine include analgesia and euphoria, also may include dysphoria and hallucinations at high doses, most likely due to action at κ-opioid and σ receptors. Phenazocine appears to be a much stronger analgesic with fewer side effects than pentazocine, probably due to a more favorable μ/κ binding ratio. Phenazocine is a much more potent analgesic than pentazocine and other drugs in the benzomorphan series, most probably due to the presence of an N-phenethyl substitution, which is known to boost μ-opioid activity in many classes of opioid analgesics. Also, it does not cause spasm of the sphincter of Oddi, making it more suitable than morphine for the treatment of biliary or pancreatic pain.

Regarding the two enantiomers of phenazocine, (R)-phenazocine has twenty times the potency of morphine as an analgesic, while (S)-phenazocine has about four times the potency of morphine.

== History ==
Phenazocine was invented in the 1950s. It was one of a number of benzomorphan opioids (including pentazocine, dezocine, and cyclazocine) developed in the search for non-addictive strong analgesics.

Phenazocine was once widely used, and was mainly supplied as 5 mg tablets of the hydrobromide salt for sublingual use (Narphen, Prinadol and other names), but its use was discontinued in the United Kingdom in 2001.

Phenazocine was briefly used in the United States but fell out of favor; it remains a Schedule II substance under the Comprehensive Drug Abuse Control & Prevention Act (Controlled Substances Act) of 1970 (CSA) but is not manufactured. The DEA ACSCN for phenazocine is 9715 and its 2013 annual manufacturing quota was 6 grams.

== See also ==
- κ-Opioid receptor agonist
- Tapentadol - An opioid analgesic with reduced abuse-liability
