= 2,6-Dimethylpiperidine =

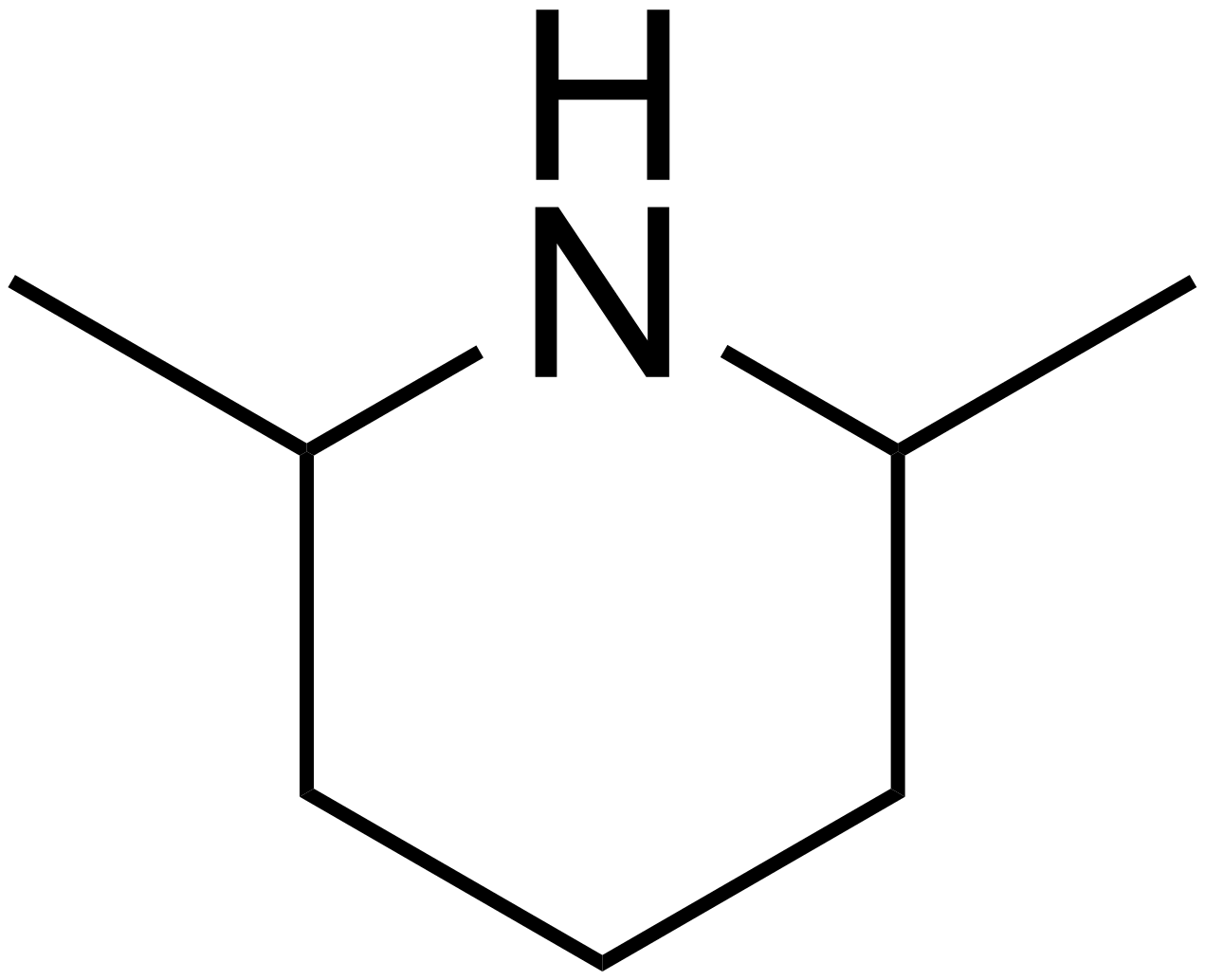
- Structure of 2,6-dimethylpiperidine

Names
- Preferred IUPAC name 2,6-Dimethylpiperidine
- Other names 2,6-Lupetidine; nanofin; nanophyn

Identifiers
CAS Number	504-03-0
3D model (JSmol)	Interactive image; Interactive image
ChEMBL	ChEMBL2104431
ChemSpider	62076
ECHA InfoCard	100.007.256
EC Number	207-981-6
PubChem CID	68843
RTECS number	OK5775000
UNII	329I5805BP
CompTox Dashboard (EPA)	DTXSID8048527
- InChI: InChI=1S/C7H15N/c1-6-4-3-5-7(2)8-6/h6-8H,3-5H2,1-2H3 Key: SDGKUVSVPIIUCF-UHFFFAOYSA-N; InChI=1/C7H15N/c1-6-4-3-5-7(2)8-6/h6-8H,3-5H2,1-2H3 Key: SDGKUVSVPIIUCF-UHFFFAOYAU
- SMILES: CC1CCCC(C)N1; N1C(C)CCCC1C

Properties
Chemical formula	C_{7}H_{15}N
Molar mass	113.204 g·mol^{−1}
Appearance	Colorless liquid
Density	0.84 g/mL
Boiling point	113.2 °C (235.8 °F; 386.3 K)
Solubility in water	Low
Solubility in other solvents	Most organic solvents
Basicity (pK_{b})	ca. 10
Refractive index (n_{D})	1.4394

Hazards
- Occupational safety and health (OHS/OSH)
Main hazards	Flammable
- GHS labelling
Pictograms	(GHS02: Flammable) (GHS05: Corrosive) (GHS07: Exclamation mark)
Signal word	Danger
Hazard statements	H225, H314, H315, H319, H335
Precautionary statements	P210, P233, P240, P241, P242, P243, P260, P264, P271, P280, P301+P330+P331, P302+P352, P303+P361+P353, P304+P340, P305+P351+P338, P310, P312, P321, P332+P313, P337+P313, P362, P363, P370+P378, P403+P233, P403+P235, P405, P501
Flash point	11 °C (52 °F; 284 K)

Related compounds
Related compounds	Piperidine
- Except where otherwise noted, data are given for materials in their standard state (at 25 °C [77 °F], 100 kPa). verify (what is ?) Infobox references

2,6-Dimethylpiperidines are chemical compounds with the formula C_{5}H_{8}(CH_{3})_{2}NH. Three stereoisomers exist: the achiral (R,S)-isomer and the chiral (R,R)/(S,S) enantiomeric pair. Dimethylpiperidines are derivatives of the heterocycle piperidine, wherein two hydrogen atoms are replaced by methyl groups.

The 2,6-dimethylpiperidines are prepared by reduction of 2,6-dimethylpyridine (2,6-lutidine). The achiral isomer is the predominant isomer produced in this reaction.

The 2,6-dimethylpiperidines are of interest for their conformational properties. The (R,S)-isomer exists largely in the chair conformation with equatorial methyl groups. The (R,R)/(S,S)-isomers are attractive chiral secondary amine building blocks.

== See also ==
Compound Summary 2,6-Dimethylpiperidine on National Library of Medicine National Center
