= Pentazocine =

Opioid medication

Clinical data
- AHFS/Drugs.com: Monograph (hydrochloride); Monograph (lactate)
- Pregnancy category: AU: C
- Routes of administration: By mouth, intramuscular, intravenous
- Drug class: κ-Opioid receptor agonist; μ-Opioid receptor agonist–antagonist; Opioid analgesic; Hallucinogen
- ATC code: N02AD01 (WHO)

Legal status
- Legal status: AU: S8 (Controlled drug); BR: Class B1 (Psychoactive drugs); CA: Schedule I; DE: Anlage III (Special prescription form required); UK: Class B; US: Schedule IV; UN: Psychotropic Schedule III

Pharmacokinetic data
- Bioavailability: ~20% orally
- Metabolism: Hepatic
- Onset of action: 15 min
- Elimination half-life: 2 to 3 hours
- Excretion: Renal

Identifiers
- IUPAC name: (2RS,6RS,11RS)-6,11-dimethyl-3-(3-methylbut-2-en-1-yl)-1,2,3,4,5,6-hexahydro-2,6-methano-3-benzazocin-8-ol or 2-dimethylallyl-5,9-dimethyl-2'-hydroxybenzomorphan
- CAS Number: 359-83-1
- PubChem CID: 441278
- IUPHAR/BPS: 1606
- DrugBank: DB00652
- ChemSpider: 390041
- UNII: RP4A60D26L
- KEGG: D00498
- ChEMBL: ChEMBL560
- CompTox Dashboard (EPA): DTXSID7023433
- ECHA InfoCard: 100.006.032

Chemical and physical data
- Formula: C_{19}H_{27}NO
- Molar mass: 285.431 g·mol^{−1}
- 3D model (JSmol): Interactive image
- SMILES: Oc1ccc3c(c1)[C@]2([C@H]([C@H](N(CC2)C\C=C(/C)C)C3)C)C
- InChI: InChI=1S/C19H27NO/c1-13(2)7-9-20-10-8-19(4)14(3)18(20)11-15-5-6-16(21)12-17(15)19/h5-7,12,14,18,21H,8-11H2,1-4H3/t14-,18+,19+/m0/s1; Key:VOKSWYLNZZRQPF-GDIGMMSISA-N

Pentazocine, sold under the brand name Talwin among others, is an opioid analgesic medication used to treat moderate to severe pain. Pentazocine activates (agonizes) κ-opioid receptors (KOR) and μ-opioid receptors (MOR). It shares many of the side effects of other opioids like constipation, nausea, itching, drowsiness, and respiratory depression, but, unlike most other opioids, it fairly frequently causes hallucinations, nightmares, and delusions. It is also, unlike most other opioids, subject to a ceiling effect, which is when at a certain dose no more pain relief is obtained by increasing the dose any further.

Chemically it is classed as a benzomorphan and it comes in two enantiomers.

It was patented in 1960 and approved for medical use in 1964. Usually, in its oral formulations, it is combined with naloxone so as to prevent people from crushing the tablets, dissolving them in saline and injecting them for a high (as orally administered naloxone produces no opioid-negating effects as it has no oral bioavailability, whereas intravenous or intramuscular administration does).

== Uses ==
=== Medical ===
Pentazocine is used primarily to treat pain, although its analgesic effects are subject to a ceiling effect. It has been discontinued by its corporate sponsor in Australia, although it may be available through the special access scheme.

=== Recreational ===
In the 1970s, recreational drug users discovered that combining pentazocine with tripelennamine (a first-generation ethylenediamine antihistamine most commonly dispensed under the brand names Pelamine and Pyribenzamine) produced a euphoric sensation. Since tripelennamine tablets are typically blue in color and brand-name Pentazocine was sold as Talwin, the pentazocine/tripelennamine combination acquired the slang name Ts and blues. After health-care professionals and drug-enforcement officials became aware of this scenario, the μ-opioid receptor antagonist naloxone was added to oral preparations containing pentazocine to prevent perceived misuse via injection, and the reported incidence of recreational use has declined precipitously since.

== Adverse effects ==
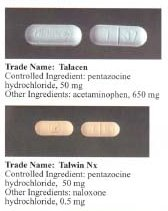

Side effects are similar to those of morphine, but due to pentazocine's action at the κ-opioid receptor, it is more likely to invoke psychotomimetic effects. High dose may cause high blood pressure or high heart rate. It may also increase cardiac work after myocardial infarction when given intravenously and hence this use should be avoided where possible. Respiratory depression is a common side effect, but is subject to a ceiling effect, such that at a certain dose the degree of respiratory depression will no longer increase with dose increases. Albeit rarely, pentazocine has been associated with agranulocytosis, erythema multiforme and toxic epidermal necrolysis.

== Pharmacology ==
Pentazocine has weak binding affinity for the μ-opioid receptor in humans at 117.8 nM (Morphine 1.168).

== History ==
Pentazocine was developed by the Sterling Drug Company, Sterling-Winthrop Research Institute, of Rensselaer, New York. The analgesic compound was first made at Sterling in 1958. U.S. testing was conducted between 1961 and 1967. It was approved by the Food and Drug Administration in June 1967 after being favorably reviewed following testing on 12,000 patients in the United States. By mid 1967 Pentazocine was already being sold in Mexico, England, and Argentina, under different trade names.

== Society and culture ==
=== Legal status ===
==== United States ====
Pentazocine was originally unclassified under the Controlled Substances Act in the United States. A petition was filed with the US Drug Enforcement Administration (DEA) on October 1, 1971, to shift it to Schedule III. The petition was filed by Joseph L. Fink III, a pharmacist and law student at Georgetown University Law Center as part of the course Lawyering in the Public Interest. That petition was accepted for review on November 10, 1971. The DEA published a Final Rule transferring it to Schedule IV on January 10, 1979, with an effective date of February 9, 1979. Pentazocine is still classified in Schedule IV under the Controlled Substances Act in the United States, even with the addition of naloxone. Some states classify it in Schedule II, such as Illinois and South Carolina (injectable form only), or Schedule III such as Kentucky.) Internationally, pentazocine is a Schedule III drug under the Convention on Psychotropic Substances, except in Canada where it is Schedule I under the federal Controlled Drugs and Substances Act. Pentazocine has a DEA ACSCN of 9720; being a Schedule IV substance, the DEA does not assign an annual manufacturing quota for pentazocine for the United States.

=== Brand names ===
Pentazocine is sold under several brand names, such as Fortral, Sosegon, Talwin NX (with naloxone), Talwin, Talwin PX, Fortwin, and Talacen (with paracetamol).

== Research ==
In one clinical study, pentazocine was found to rapidly and substantially reduce symptoms of mania in individuals with bipolar disorder that were in the manic phase of the condition. It was postulated that the efficacy observed was due to κ-opioid receptor activation-mediated amelioration of hyperdopaminergia in the reward pathways. Minimal sedation and no side effects including psychotomimetic effects or worsening of psychosis were observed at the dose administered.

== See also ==
- κ-Opioid receptor agonist
- Cyclazocine
- Volazocine
