= Cyclazocine =

Chemical compound

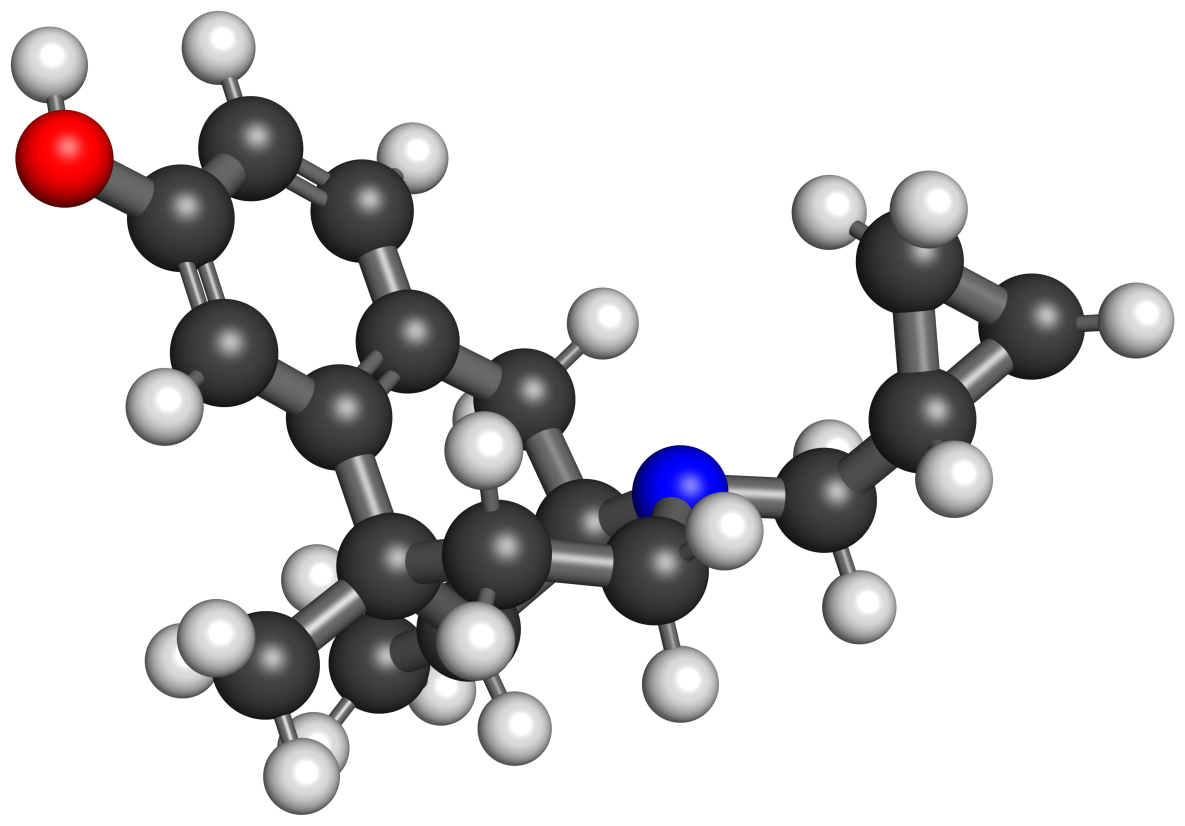

Clinical data
- Routes of administration: By mouth
- ATC code: none

Identifiers
- IUPAC name: 3-(Cyclopropylmethyl)-6,11-dimethyl-1,2,3,4,5,6-hexahydro-2,6-methano-3-benzazocin-8-ol or 2-Cyclopropylmethyl-2'-hydroxy-5,9-dimethyl-6,7-benzomorphan
- CAS Number: 3572-80-3
- PubChem CID: 19143
- IUPHAR/BPS: 1604
- ChemSpider: 18063
- UNII: J5W1B1159C
- KEGG: D03618
- ChEMBL: ChEMBL56585
- CompTox Dashboard (EPA): DTXSID9022863
- ECHA InfoCard: 100.020.627

Chemical and physical data
- Formula: C_{18}H_{25}NO
- Molar mass: 271.404 g·mol^{−1}
- 3D model (JSmol): Interactive image
- SMILES: Oc1ccc4c(c1)C2(C(C(N(CC2)CC3CC3)C4)C)C
- InChI: InChI=1S/C18H25NO/c1-12-17-9-14-5-6-15(20)10-16(14)18(12,2)7-8-19(17)11-13-3-4-13/h5-6,10,12-13,17,20H,3-4,7-9,11H2,1-2H3; Key:YQYVFVRQLZMJKJ-UHFFFAOYSA-N

Cyclazocine is a mixed opioid agonist/antagonist related to dezocine, pentazocine and phenazocine. It is in the benzomorphan and benzazocine family of drugs. It is a κ-opioid receptor agonist and μ-opioid receptor partial agonist, and also has high affinity for the δ-opioid receptor.

== Research ==
Research into the use of cyclazocine for the treatment of bipolar patients with depression was undertaken by Fink and colleagues (1970). It showed that 8 out of 10 patients experienced moderate improvement.

Research during the 1960s and 1970s into the possible use of cyclazocine for management of pain, and later for assisting treatment of opioid addiction was severely hampered by the drug's psychotomimetic, dysphoric, and hallucinatory effects. The dysphoric/anxiety-inducing effects of the drug correlate with increasing dosage and would likely reduce the risk of abuse in the same manner as other opioids which preferentially act on the KOR versus the DOR and MOR, although the side-effect threshold is often lower than the lowest effective dose.
