= C7H5NO4 =

The molecular formula C_{7}H_{5}NO_{4} (molar mass: 167.12 g/mol) may refer to:

- Cinchomeronic acid, a dicarboxylic acid
- Dinicotinic acid, a dicarboxylic acid
- Dipicolinic acid, a dicarboxylic acid
- Nitrobenzoic acids, a group of benzoic acid derivatives
  - 2-Nitrobenzoic acid
  - 3-Nitrobenzoic acid
  - 4-Nitrobenzoic acid
- Lutidinic acid, a dicarboxylic acid
- Quinolinic acid, a dicarboxylic acid
