= C7H7NO2 =

The molecular formula C_{7}H_{7}NO_{2} (molar mass: 137.14 g/mol) may refer to:

- Aminobenzoic acids
  - 2-Aminobenzoic acid (o-aminobenzoic acid, anthranilic acid)
  - 3-Aminobenzoic acid (m-aminobenzoic acid)
  - 4-Aminobenzoic acid (p-aminobenzoic acid, PABA)
- Mononitrotoluenes
  - 2-Nitrotoluene
  - 3-Nitrotoluene
  - 4-Nitrotoluene
- Salicylaldoxime
- Salicylamide
- Trigonelline
- Methyl isonicotinate
- Methyl nicotinate
- Alpha-Nitrotoluene or (Nitromethyl)benzene
