= Nitrobenzoic acid =

3-Nitrobenzoic acid

Nitrobenzoic acids are derivatives of benzoic acid. There are three constitutional isomers, differing in the relative position of the two substituents around the benzene ring. They are about ten times more acidic than the parent benzoic acid. Two are commercially important.

One or more isomers of nitrobenzoic acid can be prepared through the oxidation of styrene in boiling nitric acid.

The salts and esters of nitrobenzoic acids are known as nitrobenzoates.

== Isomers ==
The three isomers of nitrobenzoic acid are:

- 2-Nitrobenzoic acid is prepared by oxidation of 2-nitrotoluene.
- 3-Nitrobenzoic acid is a precursor to 3-aminobenzoic acid, which in turn is used to prepare some dyes. It can be prepared by nitration of benzoic acid. It also can be prepared by treating benzaldehyde under nitration conditions, a process that initially converts the aldehyde to the acid.
- 4-Nitrobenzoic acid is a precursor to 4-aminobenzoic acid, which is in turn used to prepare the anesthetic procaine. 4-Nitrobenzoic acid is prepared by oxidation of 4-nitrotoluene.
