= Methylaniline =

Index of chemical compounds with the same name

Methylaniline may refer to:

- N-Methylaniline
- Toluidines
  - 2-Methylaniline (o-toluidine)
  - 3-Methylaniline (m-toluidine)
  - 4-Methylaniline (p-toluidine)
