= Aminotoluene =

Aminotoluene may refer to:

- Benzylamine (α-aminotoluene)
- Toluidines
  - o-Toluidine (2-aminotoluene)
  - m-Toluidine (3-aminotoluene)
  - p-Toluidine (4-aminotoluene)
