= Mauveine =

Synthetic dye

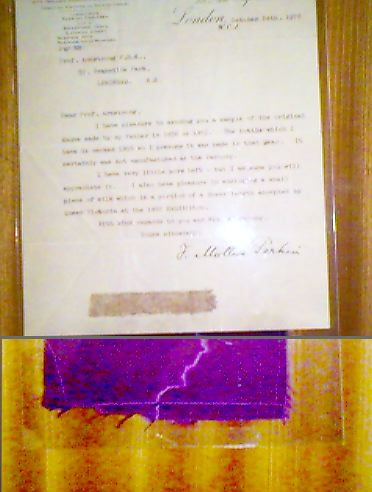
Letter from Perkin's son, with a sample of dyed silk

Mauveine, also known as aniline purple and Perkin's mauve, was one of the first synthetic dyes. It was discovered serendipitously by William Henry Perkin in 1856 while he was attempting to synthesise the phytochemical quinine for the treatment of malaria. It is also among the first chemical dyes to have been mass-produced.

== Chemistry ==
Mauveine is a mixture of four related aromatic compounds differing in number and placement of methyl groups. Its organic synthesis involves dissolving aniline, p-toluidine, and o-toluidine in sulfuric acid and water in a roughly 1:1:2 ratio, then adding potassium dichromate.

Mauveine A (C_{26}H_{23}N^{+}_{4}X^{−}) incorporates 2 molecules of aniline, one of p-toluidine, and one of o-toluidine. Mauveine B (C_{27}H_{25}N^{+}_{4}X^{−}) incorporates one molecule each of aniline, p-toluidine, and two of o-toluidine. In 1879, Perkin showed mauveine B related to safranines by oxidative/reductive loss of the p-tolyl group. In fact, safranine is a 2,8-dimethyl phenazinium salt, whereas the parasafranine produced by Perkin is presumed to be the 1,8- (or 2,9-) dimethyl isomer.

The molecular structure of mauveine proved difficult to determine, finally being identified in 1994. In 2007, two more were isolated and identified: mauveine B2, an isomer of mauveine B with methyl on different aryl group, and mauveine C, which has one more p-methyl group than mauveine A.

Skeletal formula of mauveine A

Skeletal formula of mauveine B

Skeletal formula of mauveine B2

Skeletal formula of mauveine C

In 2008, additional mauveines and pseudomauveines were discovered, bringing the total number of these compounds up to 12. In 2015 a crystal structure was reported for the first time.

== History ==
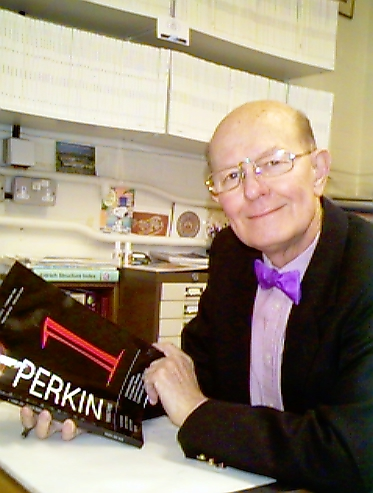
Professor Charles Rees—wearing a bow tie dyed with an original sample of mauveine—holding an RSC journal named after Perkin

Mauveine #8D029B
#8D029B

In 1856, William Henry Perkin, then age 18, was given a challenge by his professor, August Wilhelm von Hofmann, to synthesize quinine. In one attempt, Perkin oxidized aniline using potassium dichromate, whose toluidine impurities reacted with the aniline and yielded a black solid, suggesting a "failed" organic synthesis. Cleaning the flask with alcohol, Perkin noticed purple portions of the solution.

Suitable as a dye of silk and other textiles, it was patented by Perkin, who the next year opened a dyeworks mass-producing it at Greenford on the banks of the Grand Union Canal in Middlesex. It was originally called aniline purple. In 1859, it was named mauve in England via the French name for the mallow flower, and chemists later called it mauveine. Between 1859 and 1861, mauve became a fashion must have. The weekly journal All the Year Round described women wearing the colour as "all flying countryward, like so many migrating birds of purple paradise". Punch magazine published cartoons poking fun at the huge popularity of the colour “The Mauve Measles are spreading to so serious an extent that it is high time to consider by what means [they] may be checked.”

By 1870, demand succumbed to newer synthetic colours in the synthetic dye industry launched by mauveine.

In the early 20th century, the U.S. National Association of Confectioners permitted mauveine as a food colouring with a variety of equivalent names: rosolan, violet paste, chrome violet, anilin violet, anilin purple, Perkin's violet, indisin, phenamin, purpurin and lydin.

Laborers in the aniline dye industry were later found to be at increased risk of bladder cancer, specifically transitional cell carcinoma, yet by the 1950s, the synthetic dye industry had helped transform medicine, including cancer treatment.

In 1906, on the 50th anniversary of his discovery, Perkin was knighted, and the Perkin Medal was established in his honour; it remains a leading award in applied chemistry.
