= Pyridinedicarboxylic acid =

Pyridinedicarboxylic acid is a group of organic compounds which are dicarboxylic derivatives of pyridine. Pyridinedicarboxylic acid comes in several isomers:

- Quinolinic acid (2,3-pyridinedicarboxylic acid)
- Lutidinic acid (2,4-pyridinedicarboxylic acid)
- Isocinchomeronic acid (2,5-pyridinedicarboxylic acid)
- Dipicolinic acid (2,6-pyridinedicarboxylic acid)
- Cinchomeronic acid (3,4-pyridinedicarboxylic acid)
- Dinicotinic acid (3,5-pyridinedicarboxylic acid)

| Common name | Quinolinic acid | Lutidinic acid | Isocinchomeronic acid | Dipicolinic acid | Cinchomeronic acid | Dinicotinic acid |
| Systematic name | 2,3-pyridinedicarboxylic acid | 2,4-pyridinedicarboxylic acid | 2,5-pyridinedicarboxylic acid | 2,6-pyridinedicarboxylic acid | 3,4-pyridinedicarboxylic acid | 3,5-pyridinedicarboxylic acid |
| Structural formula | | | | | | |
| CAS registry number | 89-00-9 | 499-80-9 | 100-26-5 | 499-83-2 | 490-11-9 | 499-81-0 |

All isomers share the molecular weight 167.12 g/mol and the chemical formula C_{7}H_{5}NO_{4}.
