= 2-Nitrobenzoic acid =

Names
- Preferred IUPAC name 2-Nitrobenzoic acid
- Other names o-Nitrobenzoic acid

Identifiers
CAS Number	552-16-9
3D model (JSmol)	Interactive image
ChemSpider	10616
ECHA InfoCard	100.008.187
EC Number	209-004-9
PubChem CID	11087
UNII	S6S4653K7Z
CompTox Dashboard (EPA)	DTXSID5025738
- InChI: InChI=1S/C7H5NO4/c9-7(10)5-3-1-2-4-6(5)8(11)12/h1-4H,(H,9,10) Key: SLAMLWHELXOEJZ-UHFFFAOYSA-N
- SMILES: O=[N+]([O-])c1c(C(=O)O)cccc1

Properties
Chemical formula	C_{7}H_{5}NO_{4}
Molar mass	167.12 g/mol
Density	1.468
Melting point	147.5 °C (297.5 °F; 420.6 K)
Acidity (pK_{a})	2.16
Magnetic susceptibility (χ)	−76.11·10^{−6} cm^{3}/mol

Related compounds
Related compounds	Benzoic acid Nitrobenzene; Anthranilic acid 3,5-Dinitrobenzoic acid 3-Nitrobenzoic acid 4-Nitrobenzoic acid
- Except where otherwise noted, data are given for materials in their standard state (at 25 °C [77 °F], 100 kPa). Infobox references

2-Nitrobenzoic acid or o-nitrobenzoic acid is an organic compound with the formula C_{6}H_{4}(NO_{2})CO_{2}H. It is prepared by oxidation of 2-nitrotoluene with nitric acid. In consists of a carboxylic acid group and a nitro group in the ortho configuration. Reduction of the nitro group into an amine produces anthranilic acid.
