= Ralgex =

Brand of analgesic sprays and creams

Ralgex is a brand of topical analgesic sprays and creams for soothing painful muscles and joints in humans when applied to the skin. It is manufactured by GlaxoSmithKline.

== Ingredients ==
Active ingredients (% w/w) (applies for Ralgex cream):

- Glycol monosalicylate 10.00%
- Methyl nicotinate BP 1.00%
- Capsicum oleoresin BPC 0.12%

Inactive ingredients:

- Emulsifying wax
- Glycerol monostearate and polyoxyethylene sterate
- Oleyl alcohol
- Methyl and butyl hydroxybenzoate
- Perfumes and water
