= Peter DeMarco =

American physician

- Born: March 6, 1932
- Died: October 26, 2005 (aged 73)
- Medical career
- Sub-specialties: Regenerative medicine

Peter Thomas DeMarco (March 6, 1932 – October 26, 2005) was an American physician who graduated from Albright College in Pennsylvania and achieved his doctor of medicine degree in 1957 from Hahnemann Medical College of Philadelphia, Pennsylvania.

He had a research laboratory and a medical practice in Pine Hill, New Jersey. He treated patients with procaine polyvinylpyrrolidone (PVP), but his medical license was suspended in New Jersey and Pennsylvania for using the unapproved therapy after an experimental permit for Procaine-PVP was withdrawn. The FDA also said his therapy might cause cancer. This was a common misconception in the 1970s. Later research revealed procaine has anti-cancer effects in human cancer cells.

== History ==
Pharmaceutical company Johnson & Johnson's Ortho Research Laboratory wrote that case histories of his therapy, "were quite remarkable and your concepts most intriguing" and ICN Pharmaceuticals replied, "The results you have obtained with this drug in the treatment of gangrene have been most spectacular", but DeMarco was never able to commercialize the therapy beyond his own medical practice. Swiss pharmaceutical company Debiopharm S.A. replied, "Drug induced cell regeneration appears to be a revolutionary new form of treatment which is bound to be perceived as highly controversial by several regulatory agencies. We are not in a position to take the considerable time and risk involved in convincing the bureaucrats." Thus although intrigued, the pharmaceutical companies never showed a serious interest in developing his product. Regenerative medicine was a new field at the time and DeMarco likened the companies' antipathy of his discovery to the history of penicillin; although discovered in 1928, penicillin was not mass-produced until 1941 when production became a top priority World War II project to reduce the infection casualty rate.

DeMarco's clinical use of a drug not approved by the U.S. Food and Drug Administration came to the attention of regulators in both New Jersey and Pennsylvania, leading to the suspension of his license to practice and the seizure of his supply of procaine hydrochloride, which investigators later found to be contaminated and mislabeled. The New Jersey Department of Health traced 64 cases of infectious hepatitis to Dr. DeMarco. Although not available at the time of his case, DNA sequence technology is now used by regulators to pinpoint the origin of an infection.

250 of DeMarco's patients organized a patient advocacy group called S.O.S. (Save Our Shots) and filed suit to restore his license and regain their access to procaine. "He and his patients credit the drug with cures for gangrene, heart ailments, circulatory problems and other conditions through regeneration of cells." Unswayed by the patients' pleadings, the regulators denied the motion and all subsequent legal attempts.

== Theory and evidence ==
DeMarco's regenerative medicine theory was that procaine enables protein de novo synthesis by acting on cellular DNA activity causing epigenetic changes. Equal to salamanders, starfish and similar life-forms, human regeneration would be possible by selective DNA gene expression. His evidence was his human gangrene case study photographs. Although he had made hundreds of animal heart, liver and skin studies, he would always display his patients' results as validation, believing that, "Theory is good, but in the end you have to produce patient results in a clinical setting." He used time-lapse photography to demonstrate coordinated and accelerated healing while using his procaine-PVP formula. In the photo studies, certain wound healing processes appear visibly delayed while others look to be selectively accelerated in contrast to untreated wounds. Procaine's ability to retard certain wound healing processes has been well researched. He hypothesized that these processes were DNA controlled with procaine interaction. DeMarco believed his chemically induced partial limb regeneration, scar tissue repression and coordinated tissue repair was a significant step forward in human regenerative medicine.

=== Coordinated healing ===
DeMarco’s animal studies showed a healing phenomenon he termed "coordinated healing". Observing that animal wounds would heal differently when treated with his formula, he tried to explain his observations: after excising a square inch of skin from a rabbit’s shaved back, he would allow it to heal normally while documenting its progress with time-lapse photography. DeMarco then performed the same experiment while treating the rabbit with his formula. He observed that the untreated wound healed haphazardly; closing in a non-circular pattern with uneven levels and with infiltrating hair growth before wound closure. In contrast, the treated rabbit shows healing in a smooth circular pattern with even levels and only after wound closure would the hair begin to regrow.

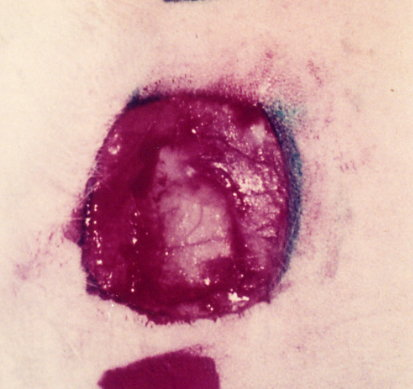
Initial wound

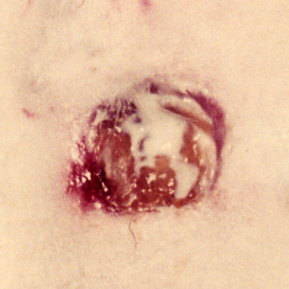
Untreated wound healing

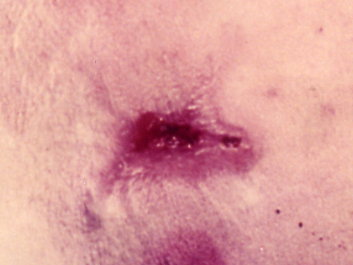
Treated wound healing

DeMarco also observed this coordinated healing in humans with his gangrene patients. Despite being diabetic, the treated wound would heal correctly with minimal scar tissue. Even the toe’s print pattern would return. Hair growth and scar tissue were suppressed while select de novo protein synthesis appeared to accelerate. He deduced that this coordinated healing pattern was a result of procaine-DNA interaction since procaine has been documented to influence DNA synthesis in simpler life forms (DNA activation in sea urchin eggs) as well as humans (restores silenced gene expression).

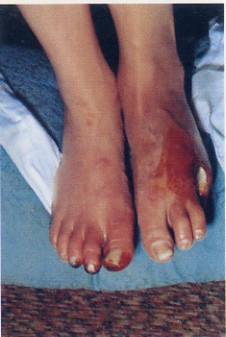
55-year-old female with advanced Buerger's disease on first visit

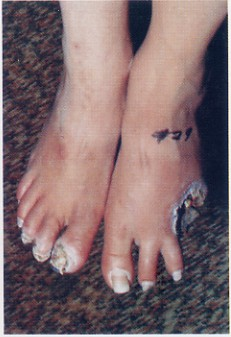
Patient's foot healing after 29 treatments

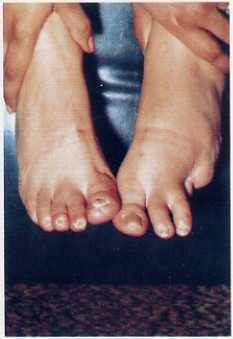
Healing

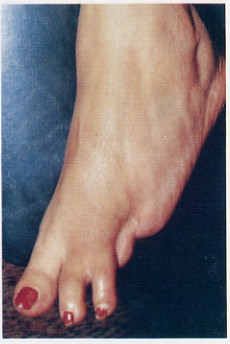
Healed
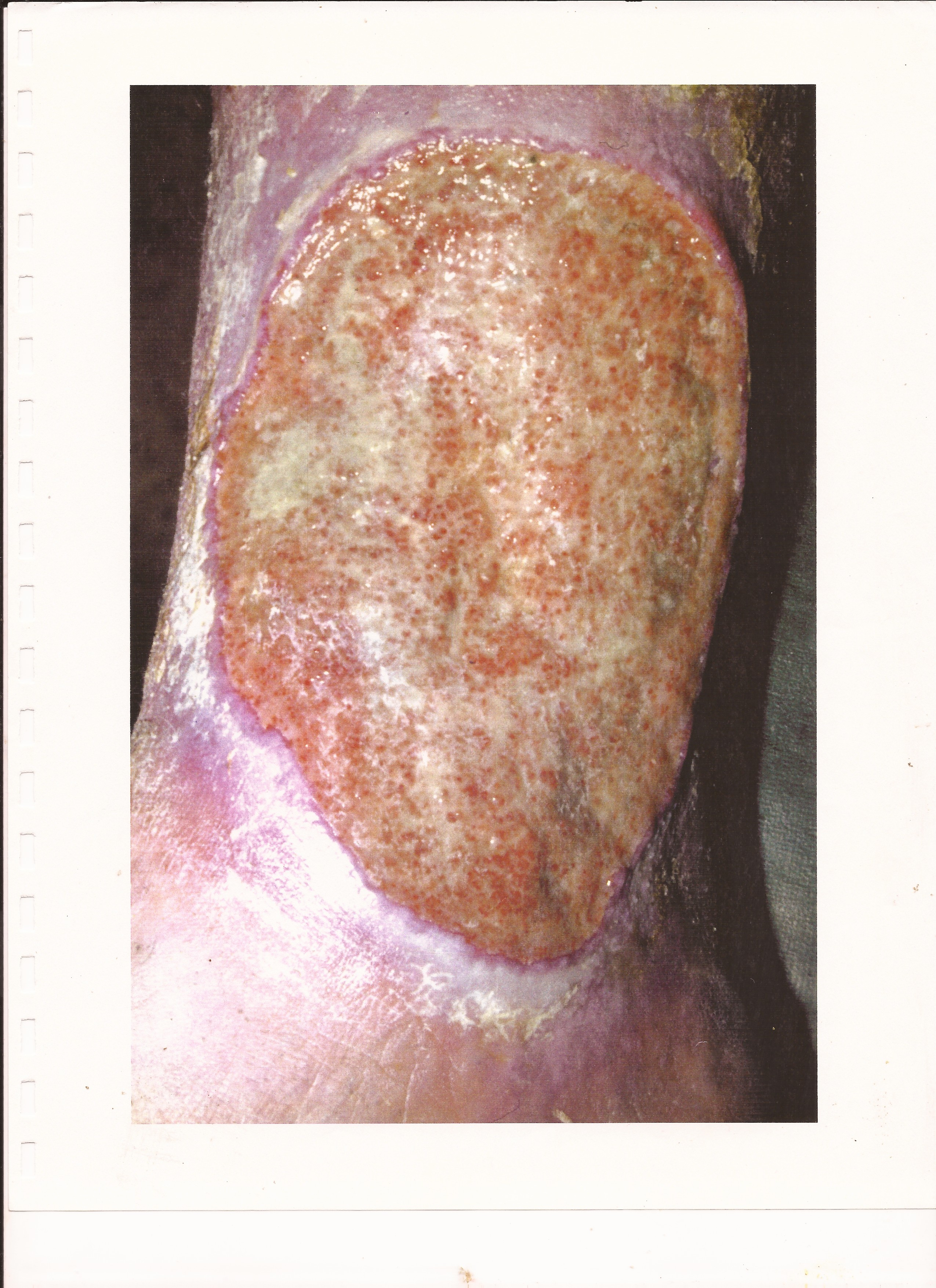
Intractable leg ulcer above the ankle on first visit

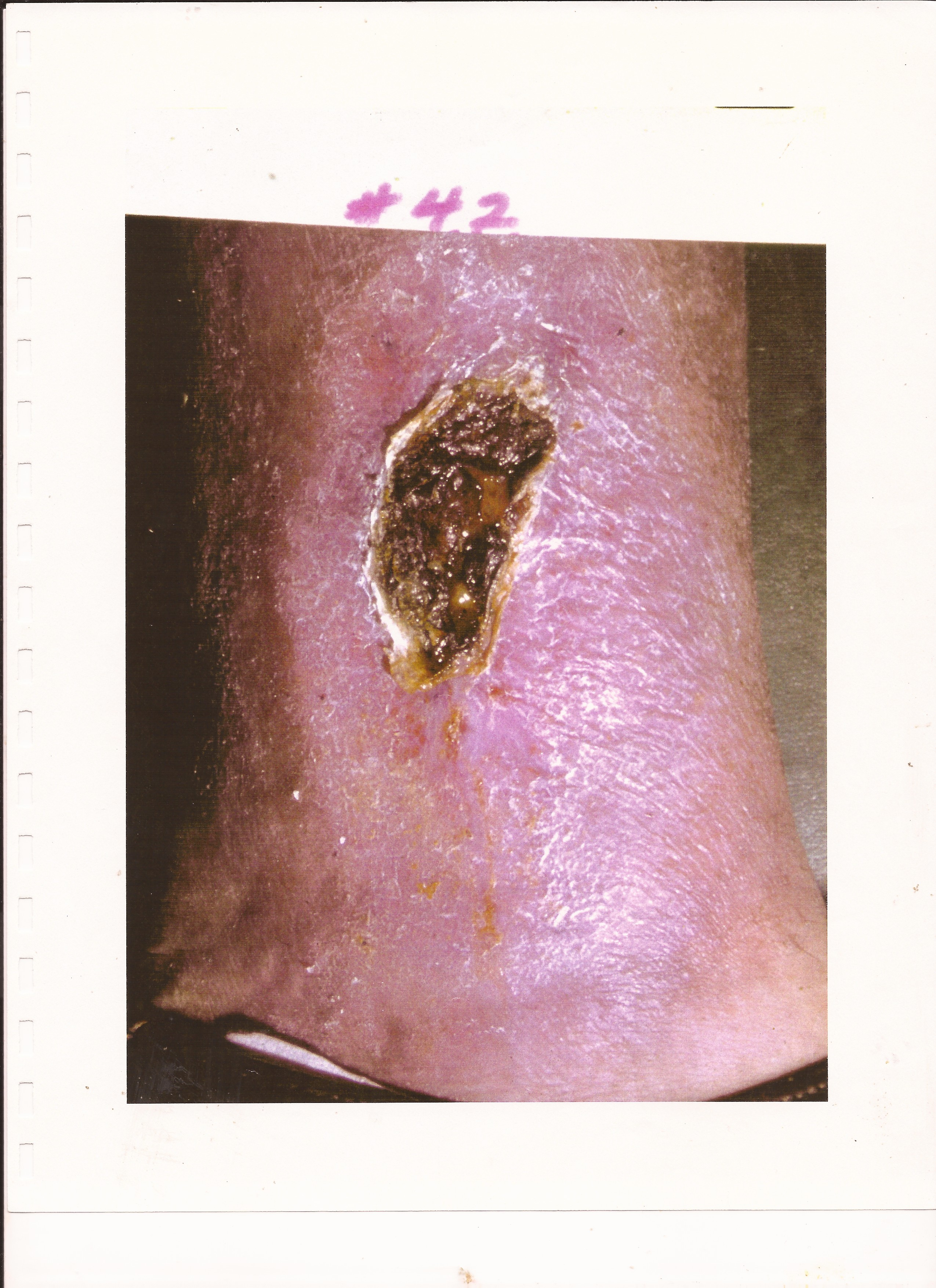
Intractable leg ulcer above the ankle healing after 42 DeMarco formula treatments

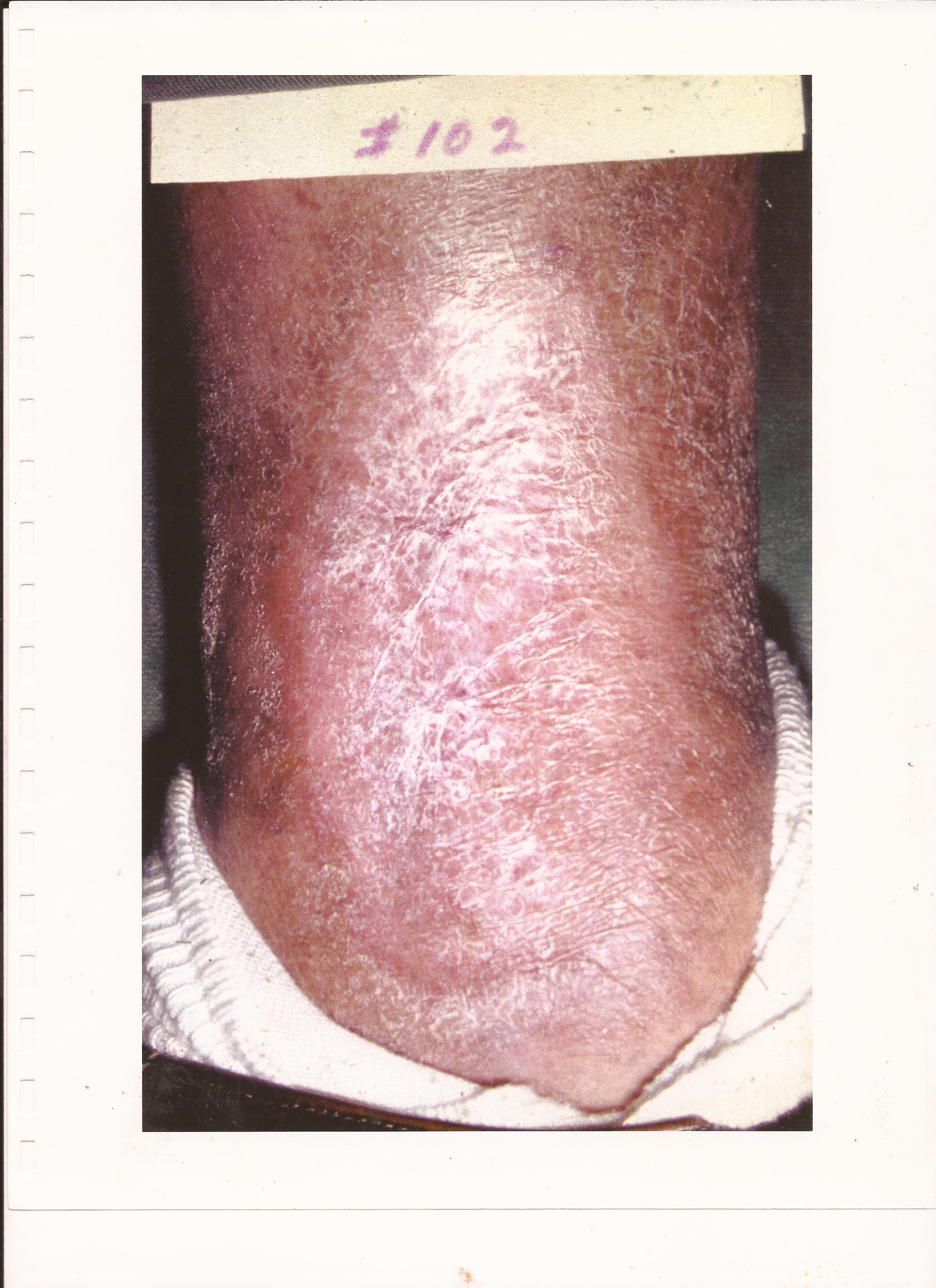
Intractable leg ulcer above the ankle healed after 102 DeMarco formula treatments

== Accolades and patents ==
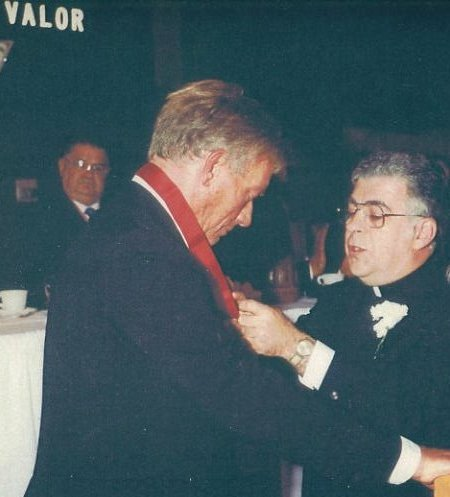
DeMarco receives the Italian American Hall of Fame honor.

- DeMarco was inducted into the Italian-American National Hall of Fame on September 9, 1984 for his scientific and humanitarian work.
- He received two US patents for his work, the first was titled: Treatment of arteriosclerotic diseases. and the second was: Method of treatment of animal and human tissues damaged by burns and frank visible gangrene.
