= 3-Nitrotoluene =

Names
- Preferred IUPAC name 1-Methyl-3-nitrobenzene
- Other names m-Nitrotoluene

Identifiers
CAS Number	99-08-1
3D model (JSmol)	Interactive image
ChEBI	CHEBI:39931
ChemSpider	21106146
ECHA InfoCard	100.002.480
PubChem CID	7422
UNII	29A9W826KQ
CompTox Dashboard (EPA)	DTXSID5021831
- InChI: InChI=1S/C7H7NO2/c1-6-3-2-4-7(5-6)8(9)10/h2-5H,1H3
- SMILES: O=[N+]([O-])c1cccc(C)c1

Properties
Chemical formula	C_{7}H_{7}NO_{2}
Molar mass	137.138 g·mol^{−1}
Appearance	yellow liquid
Odor	mild, aromatic
Density	1.1581 g·cm^{−3} @ 20°C
Melting point	15.5 °C (59.9 °F; 288.6 K)
Boiling point	232 °C (450 °F; 505 K)
Solubility in water	0.05% (20°C)
Vapor pressure	0.1 mmHg (20°C)
Magnetic susceptibility (χ)	−72.71·10^{−6} cm^{3}/mol

Hazards
Flash point	106 °C; 223 °F; 379 K
Explosive limits	1.6%-?
- NIOSH (US health exposure limits)
PEL (Permissible)	TWA 5 ppm (30 mg/m^{3}) [skin]
REL (Recommended)	TWA 2 ppm (11 mg/m^{3}) [skin]
IDLH (Immediate danger)	200 ppm
- Except where otherwise noted, data are given for materials in their standard state (at 25 °C [77 °F], 100 kPa). Infobox references

3-Nitrotoluene or meta-nitrotoluene is an organic compound with the formula CH_{3}C_{6}H_{4}NO_{2}. It is one of three isomers of nitrotoluene. A yellow liquid, it is used in the manufacture of meta-toluidine, which is an intermediate in the production of various dyes.

== Synthesis and reactions ==
It is made by nitrating toluene by conventional mixed acid (acetyl nitrate doesn't produce it): this reaction mainly affords a 2:1 mixture of 2-nitro and 4-nitro isomers, but after removal of the 2-isomer, the 3-nitrotoluene can be purified by distillation. It is a precursor to toluidine, which is used in producing azo dyes.
