= 3,5-Dinitrobenzoyl chloride =

- 3,5-Dinitrobenzoyl chloride

Names
- Preferred IUPAC name 3,5-Dinitrobenzoyl chloride

Identifiers
CAS Number	99-33-2
3D model (JSmol)	Interactive image
ChEMBL	ChEMBL2005426
ChemSpider	7154
ECHA InfoCard	100.002.500
EC Number	202-750-6
PubChem CID	7432
UNII	5JFA2DVM4D
CompTox Dashboard (EPA)	DTXSID2059194
- InChI: InChI=1S/C7H3ClN2O5/c8-7(11)4-1-5(9(12)13)3-6(2-4)10(14)15/h1-3H Key: NNOHXABAQAGKRZ-UHFFFAOYSA-N
- SMILES: C1=C(C=C(C=C1[N+](=O)[O-])[N+](=O)[O-])C(=O)Cl

Properties
Chemical formula	C_{7}H_{3}ClN_{2}O_{5}
Molar mass	230.56 g·mol^{−1}
Melting point	68–69 °C (154–156 °F; 341–342 K)
Boiling point	196 °C (385 °F; 469 K) 11 mmHg

Hazards
- GHS labelling
Pictograms	(GHS05: Corrosive)
Signal word	Danger
Hazard statements	H314
Precautionary statements	P260, P264, P280, P301+P330+P331, P303+P361+P353, P304+P340, P305+P351+P338, P310, P321, P363, P405, P501
- Except where otherwise noted, data are given for materials in their standard state (at 25 °C [77 °F], 100 kPa). Infobox references

3,5-Dinitrobenzoyl chloride (C_{7}H_{3}ClN_{2}O_{5}) is an organic compound with a melting point of 68–69 °C. It is the acyl chloride of 3,5-dinitrobenzoic acid and like it is mainly used in the analysis of organic substances by derivatization.

== Synthesis ==
3,5-dinitrobenzoyl chloride is prepared by the reaction of 3,5-dinitrobenzoic acid with phosphorus pentachloride, PCl_{5}. It can likewise be prepared by reaction with phosphorus trichloride, PCl_{3}, or thionyl chloride, SOCl_{2}.

== Uses ==
3,5-Dinitrobenzoyl chloride has its main use in the analysis of organic compounds by derivatization, specifically of alcohols and amines. It is used in cases where the substance to be analyzed is sensitive and cannot be directly reacted with 3,5-dinitrobenzoic acid. Generally, the reaction is done in pyridine in order to bind the hydrogen chloride released. With this method, it is for instance possible to identify amino acids.

Identification of alanine via reaction with 3,5-dinitrobenzoyl chloride. The product has a melting point of 177 °C
