= Methyl nicotinate =

Names
- IUPAC name Methyl pyridine-3-carboxylate
- Other names Nicotinic acid methyl ester; Nikomet

Identifiers
CAS Number	93-60-7
3D model (JSmol)	Interactive image
ChEBI	CHEBI:134761
ChEMBL	ChEMBL379845
ChemSpider	21111785
DrugBank	DB13882
ECHA InfoCard	100.002.057
EC Number	202-261-8
KEGG	D04991
PubChem CID	7151
UNII	7B1AVU9DJN
CompTox Dashboard (EPA)	DTXSID7044471
- InChI: InChI=1S/C7H7NO2/c1-10-7(9)6-3-2-4-8-5-6/h2-5H,1H3 Key: YNBADRVTZLEFNH-UHFFFAOYSA-N
- SMILES: COC(=O)C1=CN=CC=C1

Properties
Chemical formula	C_{7}H_{7}NO_{2}
Molar mass	137.138 g·mol^{−1}
Melting point	39 °C (102 °F; 312 K)
Boiling point	209 °C (408 °F; 482 K)

Hazards
- GHS labelling
Pictograms	(GHS07: Exclamation mark)
Signal word	Warning
Hazard statements	H315, H319
Precautionary statements	P264, P264+P265, P280, P302+P352, P305+P351+P338, P321, P332+P317, P337+P317, P362+P364
- Except where otherwise noted, data are given for materials in their standard state (at 25 °C [77 °F], 100 kPa). Infobox references

Methyl nicotinate is a chemical compound with the molecular formula C_{7}H_{7}NO_{2}. It is the methyl ester of nicotinic acid (niacin).

== Properties ==
Methyl nicotinate is a white crystalline solid with a melting point of 39 °C. It is soluble in water, ethanol, and benzene.

== Uses ==
Methyl nicotinate is a rubefacient and is used in some over-the-counter topical medical sprays, such as Ralgex, for relief of muscle and joint pains.

== See also ==
- Methyl isonicotinate
- Trigonelline (N-methyl nicotinate)
