= Procaine =

Local anesthetic drug

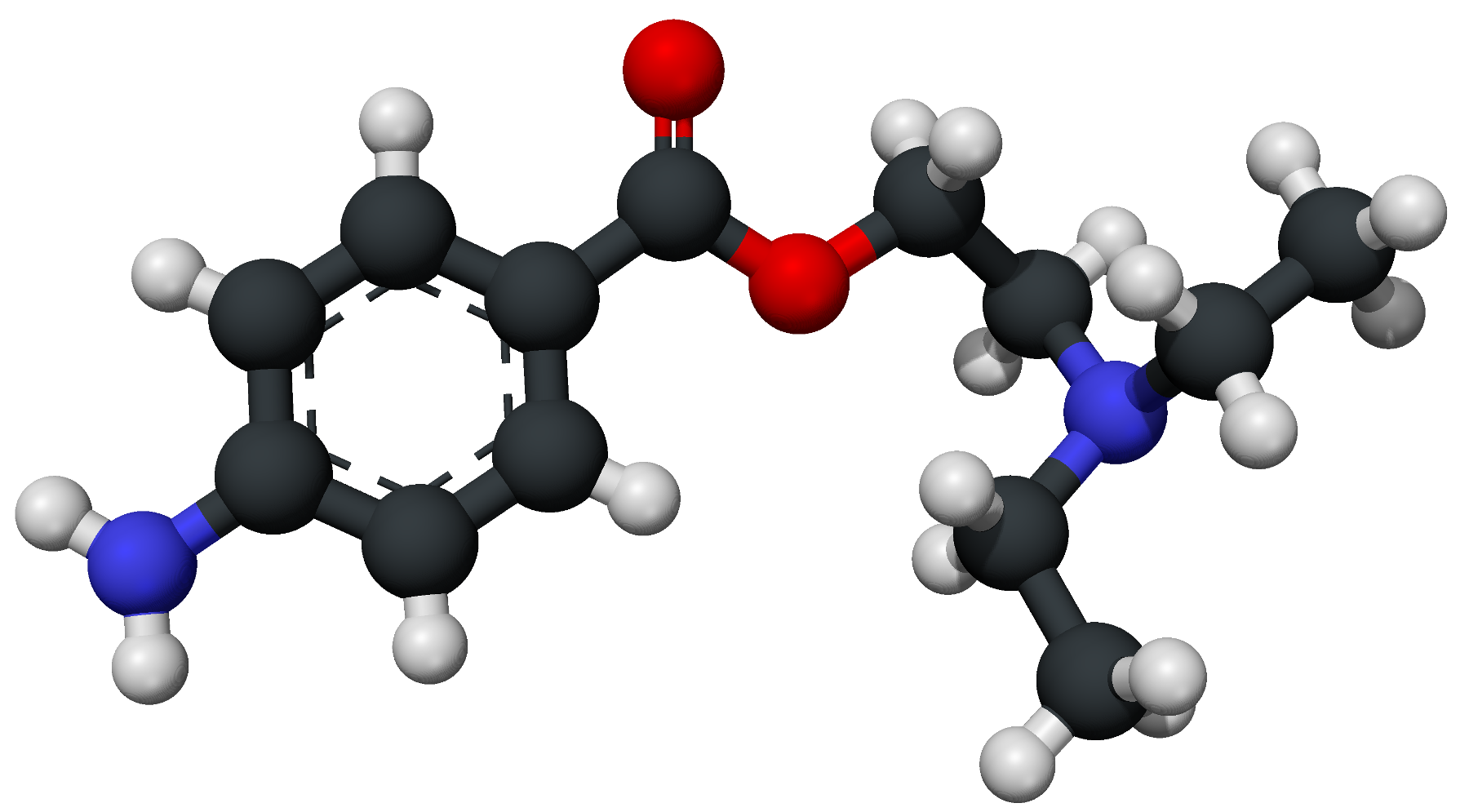

Clinical data
- AHFS/Drugs.com: Monograph
- Pregnancy category: AU: B2
- Routes of administration: Parenteral
- ATC code: N01BA02 (WHO) C05AD05 (WHO) S01HA05 (WHO)

Legal status
- Legal status: AU: S4 (Prescription only)

Pharmacokinetic data
- Bioavailability: N/A
- Metabolism: Hydrolysis by plasma esterases
- Elimination half-life: 40–84 seconds
- Excretion: Renal

Identifiers
- IUPAC name: 2-(diethylamino)ethyl 4-aminobenzoate
- CAS Number: 59-46-1
- PubChem CID: 4914
- IUPHAR/BPS: 4291
- DrugBank: DB00721
- ChemSpider: 4745
- UNII: 4Z8Y51M438
- KEGG: D08422
- ChEBI: CHEBI:8430
- ChEMBL: ChEMBL569
- NIAID ChemDB: 019136
- CompTox Dashboard (EPA): DTXSID7045021
- ECHA InfoCard: 100.000.388

Chemical and physical data
- Formula: C_{13}H_{20}N_{2}O_{2}
- Molar mass: 236.315 g·mol^{−1}
- 3D model (JSmol): Interactive image
- SMILES: O=C(OCCN(CC)CC)c1ccc(N)cc1
- InChI: InChI=1S/C13H20N2O2/c1-3-15(4-2)9-10-17-13(16)11-5-7-12(14)8-6-11/h5-8H,3-4,9-10,14H2,1-2H3; Key:MFDFERRIHVXMIY-UHFFFAOYSA-N

Procaine is a local anesthetic drug of the amino ester group. It is most commonly used in dental procedures to numb the area around a tooth and is also used to reduce the pain of intramuscular injection of penicillin. Owing to the ubiquity of the trade name Novocain (without the "e" in the original German patent) or Novocaine (with the "e" in the US patent), in some regions, procaine is referred to generically as novocaine. It acts mainly as a sodium channel blocker. Today, it is used therapeutically in some countries due to its sympatholytic, anti-inflammatory, perfusion-enhancing, and mood-enhancing effects.

Procaine was first synthesized in 1905, shortly after amylocaine. It was created by the chemist Alfred Einhorn who gave the chemical the trade name Novocain, from the Latin nov- (meaning "new") and -caine, a common ending for alkaloids used as anesthetics. It was introduced into medical use by surgeon Heinrich Braun.

Prior to the discovery of amylocaine and procaine, cocaine was a commonly used local anesthetic. Einhorn wished his new discovery to be used for amputations, but for this surgeons preferred general anesthesia. Dentists, however, found it very useful.

== Pharmacology ==
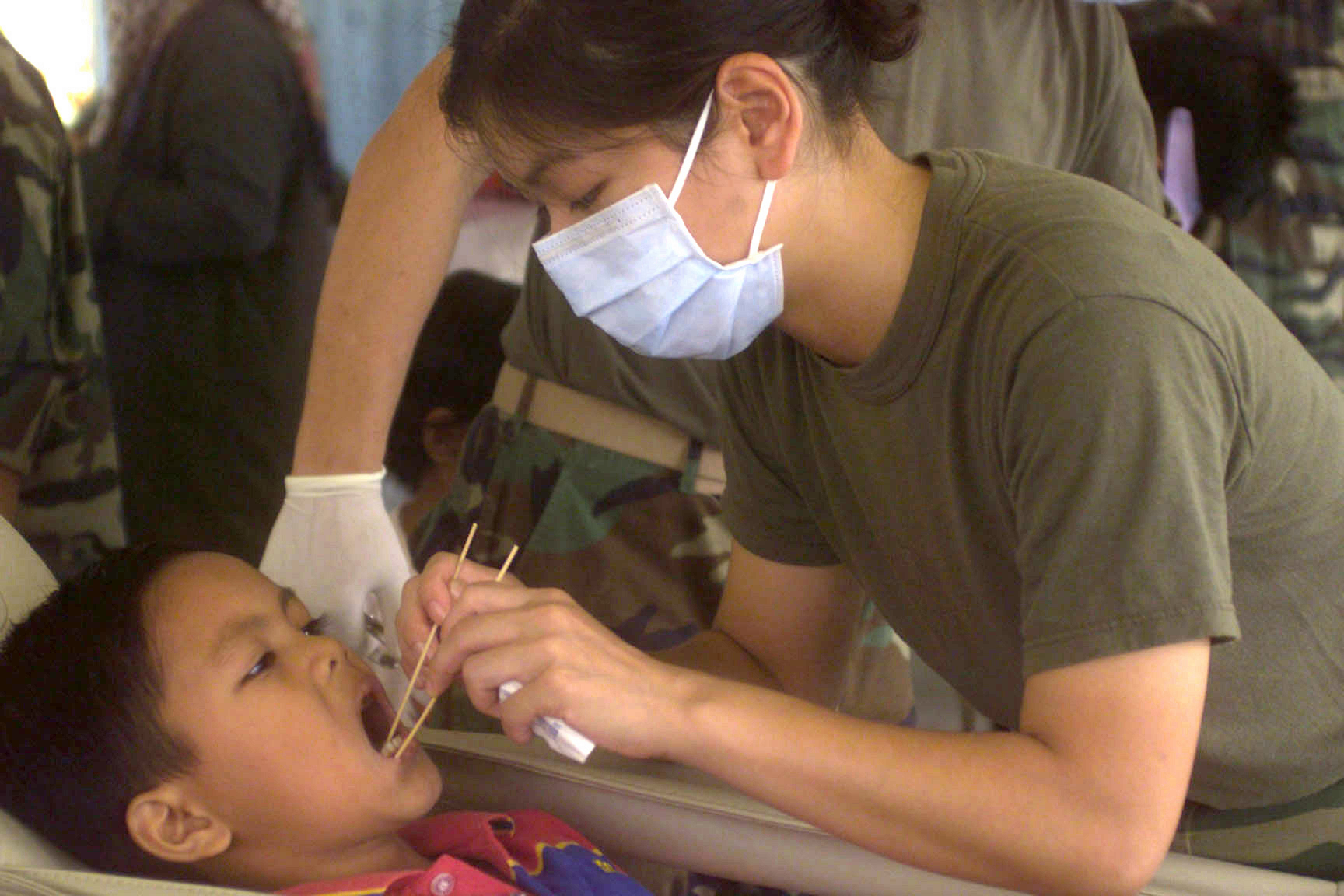
Procaine application before removal of a decayed tooth

=== Pharmacodynamics ===
The primary use for procaine is as an anaesthetic.

Aside from its use as a dental anesthetic, procaine is used less frequently today, since more effective (and hypoallergenic) alternatives such as lidocaine (Xylocaine) exist. Like other local anesthetics (such as mepivacaine, and prilocaine), procaine is a vasodilator, thus is often coadministered with epinephrine for the purpose of vasoconstriction. Vasoconstriction helps to reduce bleeding, increases the duration and quality of anesthesia, prevents the drug from reaching systemic circulation in large amounts, and overall reduces the amount of anesthetic required. As a dental anesthesic, for example, more novocaine is needed for root canal treatment than for a simple filling. Unlike cocaine, a vasoconstrictor, procaine does not have the euphoric and addictive qualities that put it at risk for abuse.

Procaine is also a DNA-demethylating agent with growth-inhibitory effects in human cancer cells.

A 1% procaine injection has been recommended for the treatment of extravasation complications associated with venipuncture, steroids, and antibiotics. It has likewise been recommended for treatment of inadvertent intra-arterial injections (10 ml of 1% procaine), as it helps relieve pain and vascular spasm.

Procaine is an occasional additive in illicit street drugs and is presented and sold usually as cocaine or heroin.

=== Pharmacokinetics ===
Procaine, an ester anesthetic, is metabolized in the plasma by the enzyme pseudocholinesterase through hydrolysis into para-amino benzoic acid (PABA), which is then excreted by the kidneys into the urine.

== Adverse effects ==
Application of procaine leads to the depression of neuronal activity. The depression causes the nervous system to become hypersensitive, producing restlessness and shaking, leading to minor to severe convulsions. Studies on animals have shown the use of procaine led to the increase of dopamine and serotonin levels in the brain. Other issues may occur because of varying individual tolerance to procaine dosage. Nervousness and dizziness can arise from the excitation of the central nervous system, which may lead to respiratory failure if overdosed. Procaine may also induce weakening of the myocardium, leading to cardiac arrest.

Procaine can also cause allergic reactions causing individuals to have problems with breathing, rashes, and swelling. Allergic reactions to procaine are usually not in response to procaine itself, but to its metabolite PABA. Allergic reactions are in fact quite rare, estimated to have an incidence of 1 per 500,000 injections. About one in 3000 white North Americans is homozygous (i.e. has two copies of the abnormal gene) for the most common atypical form of the enzyme pseudocholinesterase, and do not hydrolyze ester anesthetics such as procaine. This results in a prolonged period of high levels of the anesthetic in the blood and increased toxicity.

However, certain populations in the world such as the Vysya community in India commonly have a deficiency of this enzyme.

== Synthesis ==
Procaine can be synthesized in two ways.

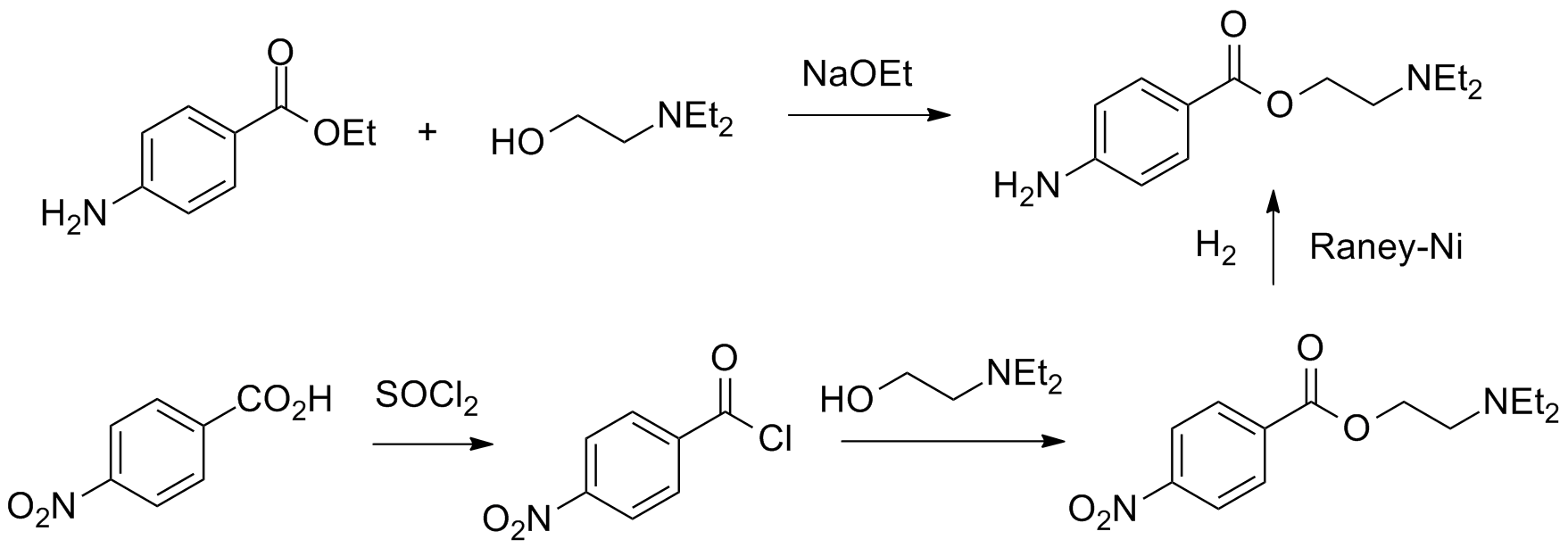
Procaine synthesis

1. The first consists of the direct reaction of benzocaine with 2-diethylaminoethanol using sodium ethoxide-ethanol solution as the solvent and base.
2. The second is by oxidizing 4-nitrotoluene to 4-nitrobenzoic acid, which is further reacted with thionyl chloride, the resulting acyl chloride is then reacted with 2-diethylaminoethanol to give Nitrocaine. Finally, the nitro group is reduced by hydrogenation over Raney nickel catalyst.

== See also ==
- Chloroprocaine
- Peter DeMarco
