= Dinicotinic acid =

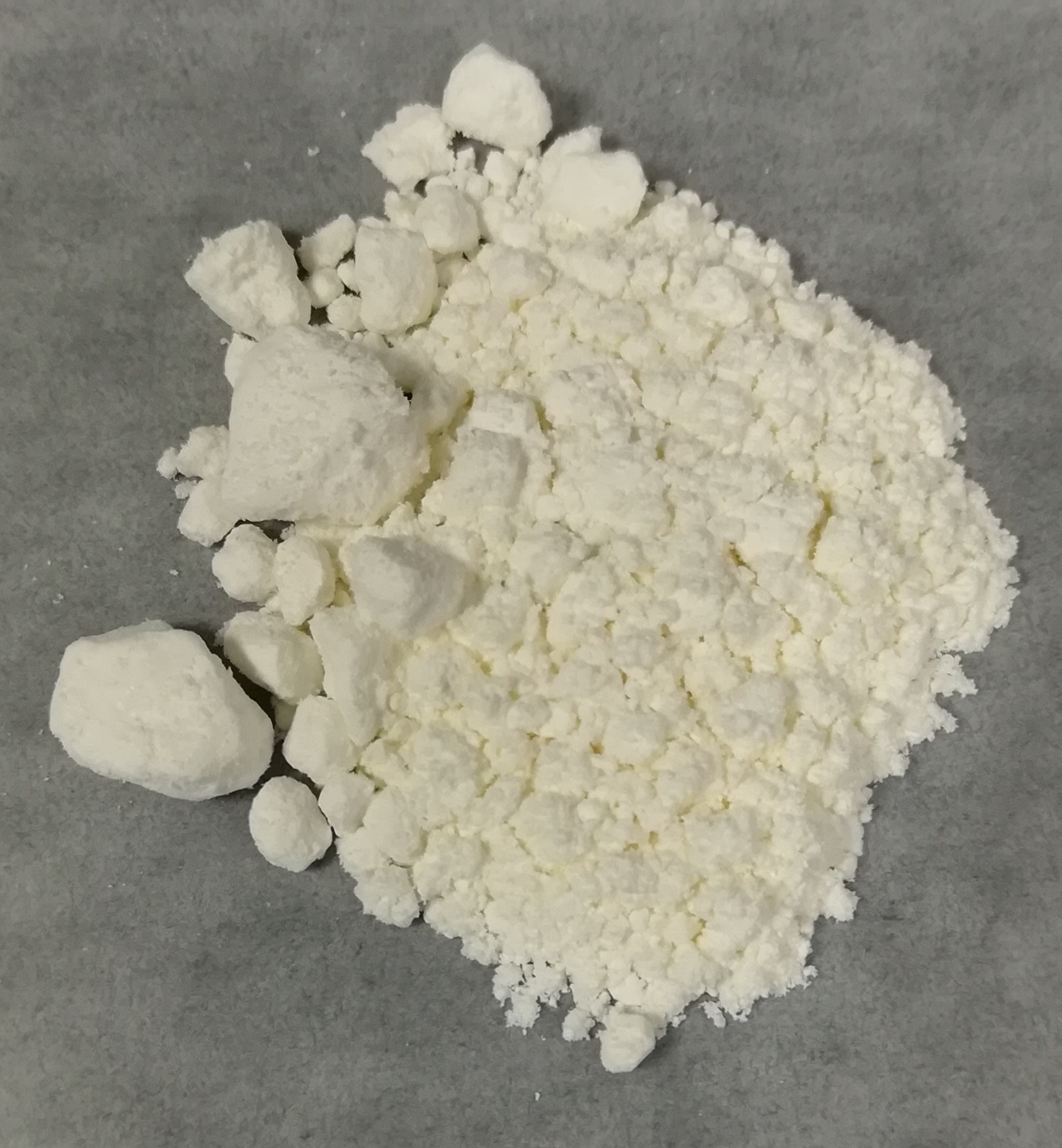

Names
- Preferred IUPAC name Pyridine-3,5-dicarboxylic acid
- Other names 3,5-Pyridinedicarboxylic acid

Identifiers
| CAS Number | 499-81-0 |
| 3D model (JSmol) | Interactive image |
| Beilstein Reference | 131640 |
| ChEBI | CHEBI:46875 |
| ChEMBL | ChEMBL446761 |
| ChemSpider | 9939 |
| ECHA InfoCard | 100.007.177 |
| EC Number | 207-893-8 |
| Gmelin Reference | 279307 |
| PubChem CID | 10366 |
| UNII | N5NMH4PZ3D |
| CompTox Dashboard (EPA) | DTXSID10198149 |
- InChI: InChI=1S/C7H5NO4/c9-6(10)4-1-5(7(11)12)3-8-2-4/h1-3H,(H,9,10)(H,11,12) Key: MPFLRYZEEAQMLQ-UHFFFAOYSA-N
- SMILES: C1=C(C=NC=C1C(=O)O)C(=O)O

Properties
| Chemical formula | C_{7}H_{5}NO_{4} |
| Molar mass | 167.120 g·mol^{−1} |

Structure
| Crystal structure | monoclinic |
| Space group | P2_{1}/c, No. 14 |
| Lattice constant | a = 9.702 Å, b = 11.153 Å, c = 6.587 Å α = 90°, β = 107.80°, γ = 90° |
| Formula units (Z) | 4 |

Hazards
- GHS labelling
| Pictograms | (GHS07: Exclamation mark) |
| Signal word | Warning |
| Hazard statements | H315, H319, H335 |
| Precautionary statements | P261, P264, P271, P280, P302+P352, P304+P340, P305+P351+P338, P312, P321, P332+P313, P337+P313, P362, P403+P233, P405, P501 |

Related compounds
| Related compounds | Quinolinic acid; Lutidinic acid; Isocinchomeronic acid; Dipicolinic acid; Cinchomeronic acid |
- Except where otherwise noted, data are given for materials in their standard state (at 25 °C [77 °F], 100 kPa). Infobox references

Dinicotinic acid (pyridine-3,5-dicarboxylic acid) is a heterocyclic organic compound, more precisely a heteroaromatic. It is one of many pyridinedicarboxylic acids and consists of a pyridine ring carrying to carboxy groups in the 3- and 5-positions.

== Preparation and properties ==
Dinicotinic acid can be formed by heating pyridine-2,3,5,6-tetracarboxylic acid or carbodinicotinic acid (pyridine-2,3,5-tricarboxylic acid).

The acid is sparingly soluble in water and ether. Its melting point of 323 °C is the highest among pyridinedicarboxylic acids. Upon heating, it decarboxylates and decomposes to nicotinic acid:

== See also ==
- Dipicolinic acid, an isomeric dicarboxylic acid
