= Cinchomeronic acid =

Names
- Preferred IUPAC name pyridine-3,4-dicarboxylic acid
- Other names: 3,4-Pyridinedicarboxylic acid; Chinchomeronic acid; NSC 178

Identifiers
CAS Number	490-11-9
3D model (JSmol)	Interactive image
Beilstein Reference	137242
ChEBI	CHEBI:46860
ChEMBL	ChEMBL261326
ChemSpider	9854
ECHA InfoCard	100.007.006
EC Number	207-705-4
Gmelin Reference	487254
PubChem CID	10273
UNII	7389UZW5DY
CompTox Dashboard (EPA)	DTXSID70197653
- InChI: InChI=1S/C7H5NO4/c9-6(10)4-1-2-8-3-5(4)7(11)12/h1-3H,(H,9,10)(H,11,12) Key: MUYSADWCWFFZKR-UHFFFAOYSA-N
- SMILES: O=C(O)C=1C=NC=CC1C(=O)O

Properties
Chemical formula	C_{7}H_{5}NO_{4}
Molar mass	167.120 g·mol^{−1}
Appearance	pale yellow crystalline
Melting point	256 °C (493 °F; 529 K)
Solubility in water	sparingly soluble

Hazards
- GHS labelling
Pictograms	(GHS07: Exclamation mark)
Signal word	Warning
Hazard statements	H315, H319, H335
Precautionary statements	P261, P264, P264+P265, P271, P280, P302+P352, P304+P340, P305+P351+P338, P319, P321, P332+P317, P337+P317, P362+P364, P403+P233, P405, P501

Related compounds
Related compounds	Quinolinic acid; Lutidinic acid; Isocinchomeronic acid; Dipicolinic acid; Dinicotinic acid
- Except where otherwise noted, data are given for materials in their standard state (at 25 °C [77 °F], 100 kPa). Infobox references

Cinchomeronic acid is an organic compound with the molecular formula C_{7}H_{5}NO_{4}. The acid was initially isolated by Hugo Weidel in 1868. The compound is one of six isomers of pyridinedicarboxylic acid that are dicarboxylic derivatives of pyridine.

== Synthesis ==
Cinchomeronic acid is obtained as a degradation product of various Cinchona alkaloids. For example, it is obtained from quinine, cinchonidine, cinchonine, and apoquinine using nitric acid or by oxidation of β-collidine, lepidine, or isoquinoline.

Cinchomeric acid can also be prepared by oxidation of isoquinoline with potassium permanganate.

== Physical properties ==
The acid forms white to pale yellow crystalline compound derived from Cinchona alkaloids. It demonstrates low solubility in water, but is more soluble in organic solvents.

It exhibits dimorphism. A conventional orthorhombic structure (called "Form I") and a newly found primitive monoclinic structure ("Form II", space group P2_{1}/c) exist.

== Uses ==
It is utilized as a precursor in the synthesis of pharmaceutical compounds and as a ligand in coordination chemistry.
