= 3,5-Dinitrobenzoic acid =

Skeletal formula
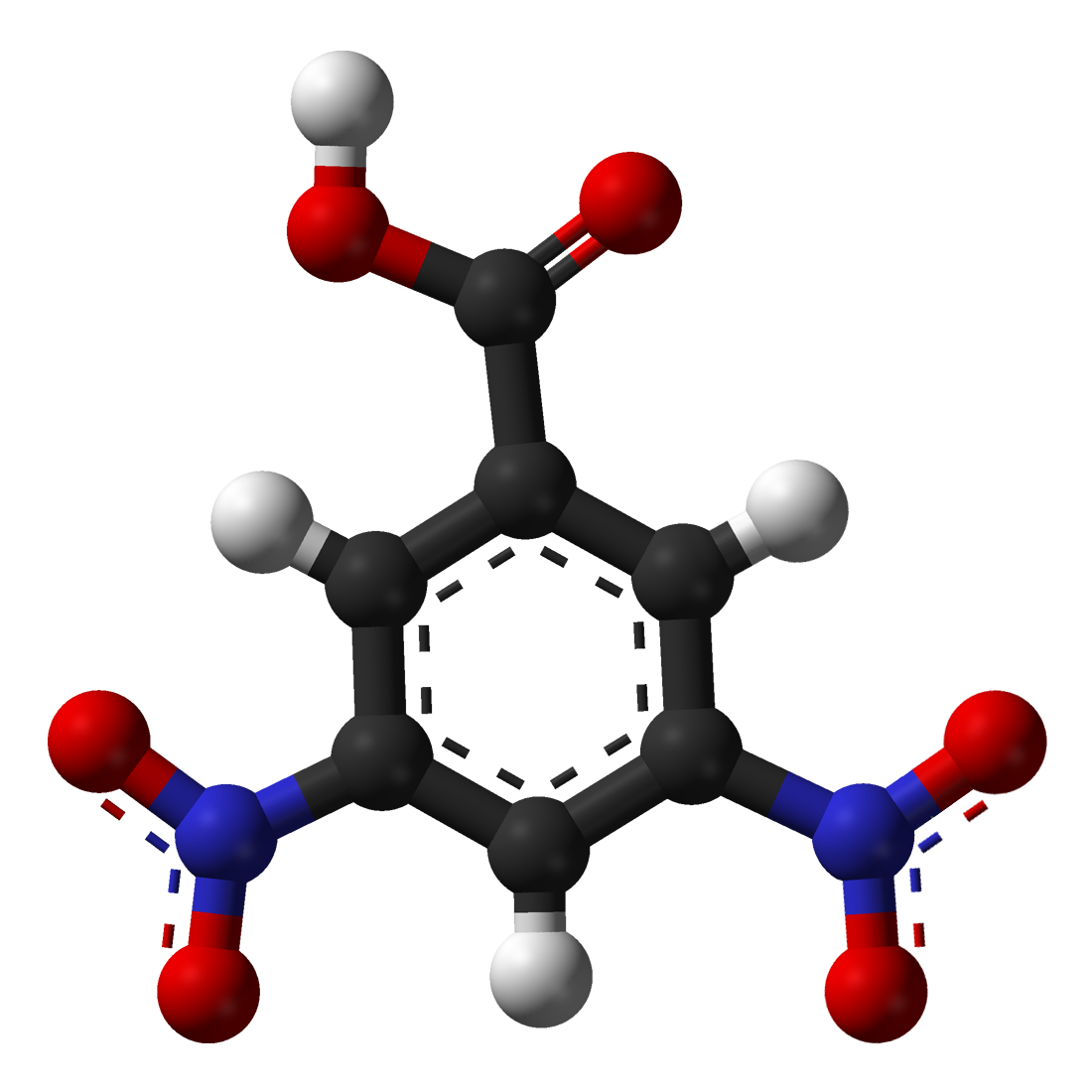
Ball-and-stick model
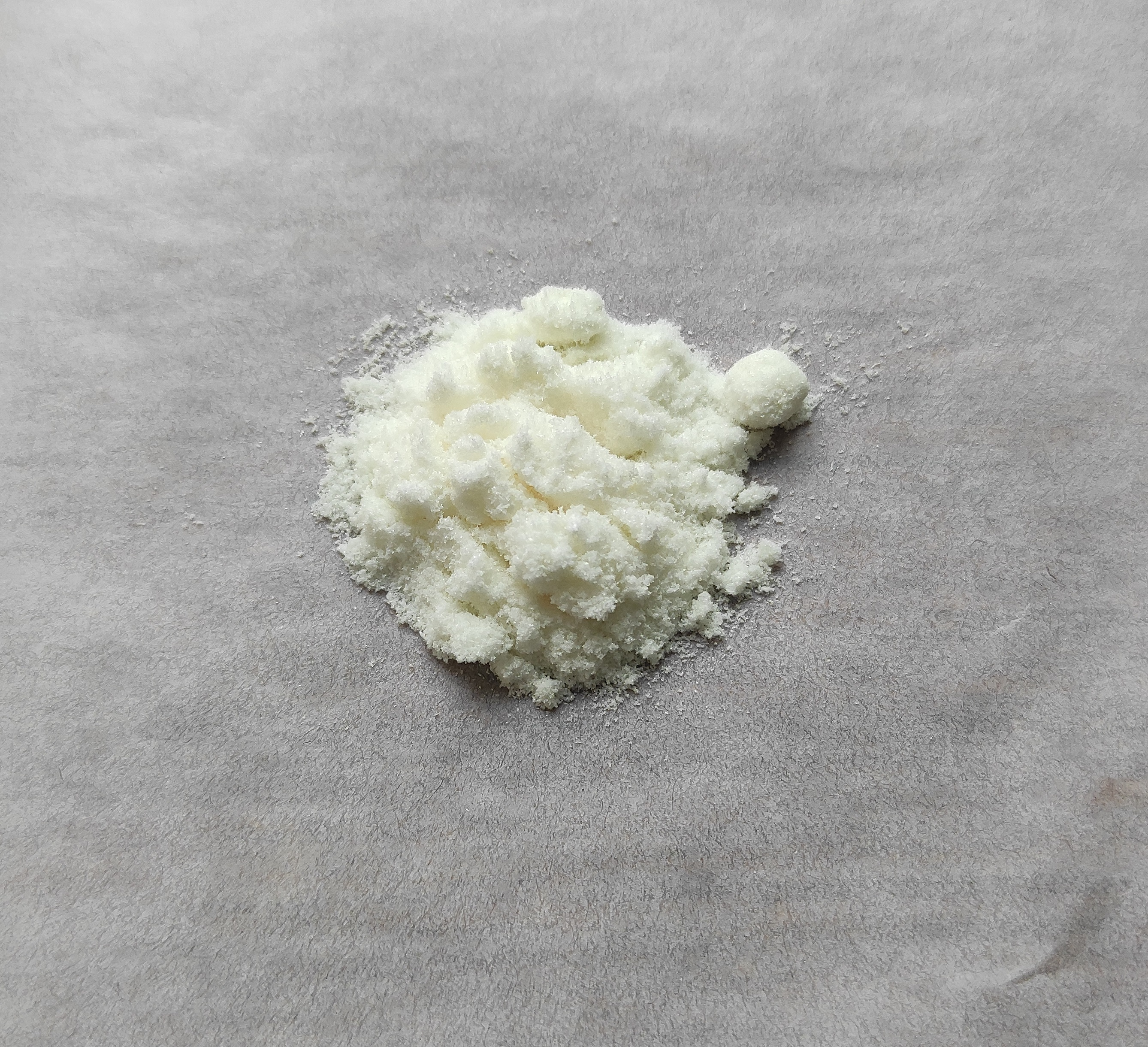

Names
- Preferred IUPAC name 3,5-Dinitrobenzoic acid

Identifiers
CAS Number	99-34-3
3D model (JSmol)	Interactive image
Beilstein Reference	1914286
ChEBI	CHEBI:73914
ChEMBL	ChEMBL118713
ChemSpider	7155
ECHA InfoCard	100.002.501
EC Number	202-751-1
PubChem CID	7433
UNII	4V3F9Q018P
CompTox Dashboard (EPA)	DTXSID7059195
- InChI: InChI=1S/C7H4N2O6/c10-7(11)4-1-5(8(12)13)3-6(2-4)9(14)15/h1-3H,(H,10,11) Key: VYWYYJYRVSBHJQ-UHFFFAOYSA-N; InChI=1/C7H4N2O6/c10-7(11)4-1-5(8(12)13)3-6(2-4)9(14)15/h1-3H,(H,10,11) Key: VYWYYJYRVSBHJQ-UHFFFAOYAQ
- SMILES: O=[N+]([O-])c1cc(cc([N+]([O-])=O)c1)C(=O)O

Properties
Chemical formula	C_{7}H_{4}O_{6}N_{2}
Molar mass	212.117 g·mol^{−1}
Appearance	Yellow or colourless crystals
Melting point	204 to 206 °C (399 to 403 °F; 477 to 479 K)
Vapor pressure	0.000001 mmHg (130 μPa)
Acidity (pK_{a})	2.82

Hazards
- GHS labelling
Pictograms	(GHS07: Exclamation mark)
Signal word	Warning
Hazard statements	H302, H315, H319, H335, H413
Precautionary statements	P261, P264, P270, P271, P273, P280, P301+P312+P330, P302+P352, P304+P340+P312, P305+P351+P338, P332+P313, P337+P313, P362, P403+P233, P405, P501
NFPA 704 (fire diamond)	2 1 0
- Except where otherwise noted, data are given for materials in their standard state (at 25 °C [77 °F], 100 kPa). verify (what is ?) Infobox references

3,5-Dinitrobenzoic acid is an organic chemical that is an important corrosion inhibitor and is also used in photography. This aromatic compound is used by chemists to identify alcohol components in esters and in the fluorometric analysis of creatinine.

== Synthesis ==
3,5-dinitrobenzoic acid is obtained from benzoic acid by the nitration reaction with nitric acid in the presence of concentrated sulfuric acid.

The nitration can also be started with 3-nitrobenzoic acid, which leads to yields of approximately 98%.

== Properties ==
3,5-Dinitrobenzoic acid is an odorless, yellowish solid. Due to the mesomeric effect of the two nitro groups, it is more acidic (pK_{a} = 2.82) than benzoic acid (pK_{a} = 4.20) and 3-nitrobenzoic acid (pK_{a} = 3.47).

== Uses ==
3,5-Dinitrobenzoic acid finds use in the identification of various organic substances, especially alcohols, by derivatization. For such an analysis, the substance to be analyzed is reacted with 3,5-dinitrobenzoic acid in the presence of sulfuric acid in order to form a derivate. By doing so, many substances that are liquid or have a low melting point are converted to easily crystallized derivates with sharp melting points. For instance, alcohols can be identified by the melting point of their esters with 3,5-dinitrobenzoic acid. This method is also applicable to a large number of amines.

Identification of isopropanol as a derivate of 3,5-dinitrobenzoic acid: 3,5-dinitrobenzoic acid-2-propylester (mp.: 123 °C (253 °F))

Compared to 4-nitrobenzoic acid, another acid that is used similarly, derivates of 3,5-dinitrobenzoic acid have higher melting points, so that it is preferred when the 4-nitrobenzoic acid derivate has a melting point too low to be accurately identified.

For more sensitive compounds, the reaction is carried out using the acid chloride, 3,5-dinitrobenzoyl chloride. This allows for example the identification of amino acids.

=== Explosives ===
Various heavy metal salts (including barium, lead, and silver) of 3,5-dinitrobenzoic acid are known to be high explosives. The lead salts are (relatively) stable and were patented for use in priming compositions.
