= O-Toluidine =

Aryl amine

o-Toluidine

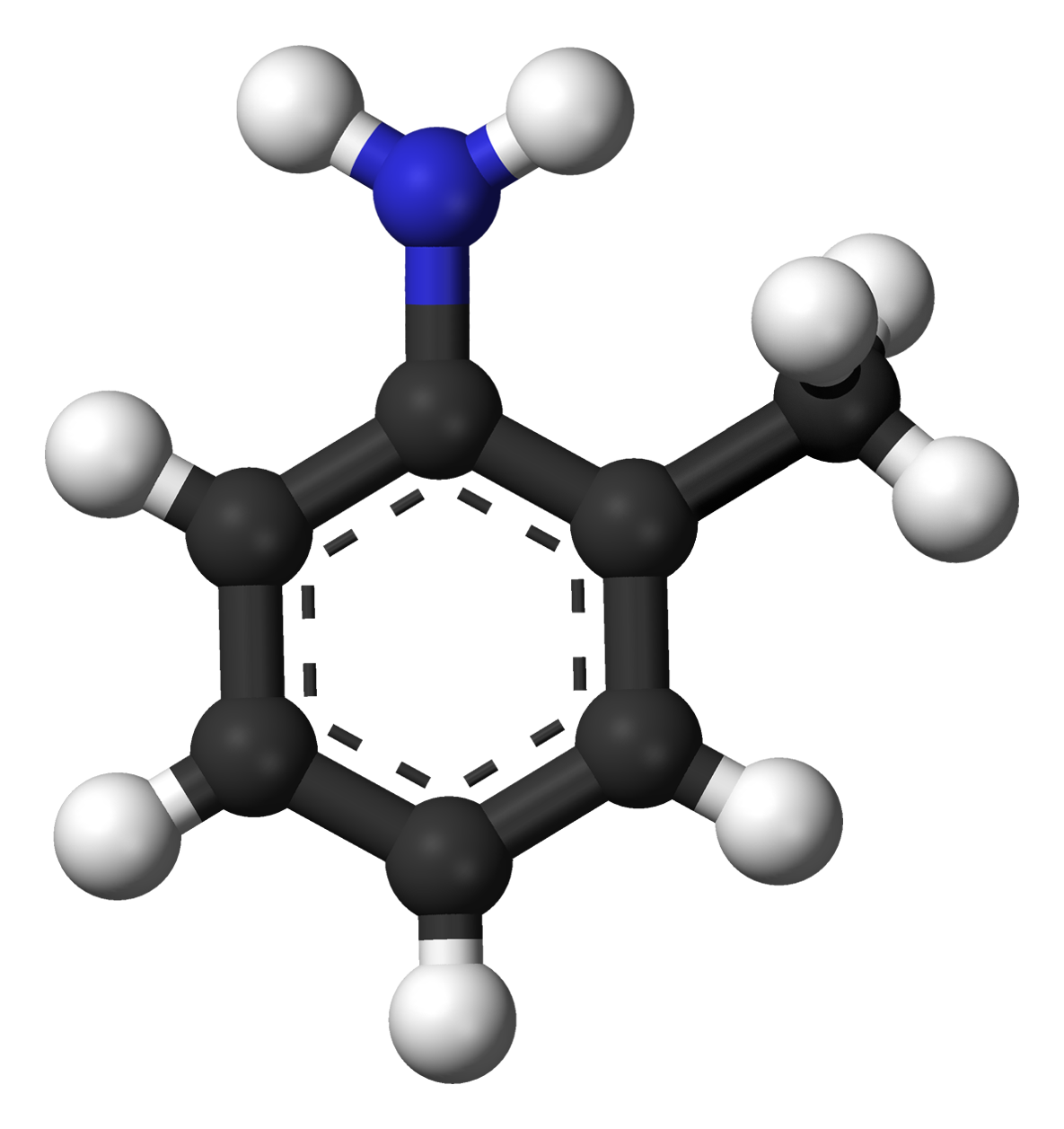

Names
- Preferred IUPAC name 2-Methylaniline
- Other names o-Methylaniline o-Toluidine; 1-Amino-2-methylbenzene; 2-Aminotoluene, 2-Toluamine

Identifiers
CAS Number	95-53-4
3D model (JSmol)	Interactive image
ChEBI	CHEBI:66892
ChEMBL	ChEMBL1381
ChemSpider	13854136
ECHA InfoCard	100.002.209
EC Number	202-429-0
KEGG	C14403
PubChem CID	7242
UNII	B635MZ0ZLU
UN number	1708 (O-TOLUIDINE)
CompTox Dashboard (EPA)	DTXSID1026164
- InChI: InChI=1S/C7H9N/c1-6-4-2-3-5-7(6)8/h2-5H,8H2,1H3 Key: RNVCVTLRINQCPJ-UHFFFAOYSA-N
- SMILES: CC1=CC=CC=C1N

Properties
Chemical formula	C_{7}H_{9}N
Molar mass	107.156 g·mol^{−1}
Appearance	Colorless liquid
Odor	Aromatic, aniline-like odor
Density	1.004 g/cm^{3}
Melting point	−23.68 °C (−10.62 °F; 249.47 K)
Boiling point	200 to 202 °C (392 to 396 °F; 473 to 475 K)
Solubility in water	0.19 g/100 ml at 20 °C
Vapor pressure	0.307531 mmHg (25 °C)
Refractive index (n_{D})	1.56987
Viscosity	4.4335 (20 °C)

Hazards
- Occupational safety and health (OHS/OSH)
Main hazards	Flammable, moderately toxic
- GHS labelling
Pictograms	(GHS02: Flammable) (GHS06: Toxic) (GHS07: Exclamation mark) (GHS08: Health hazard) (GHS09: Environmental hazard)
Signal word	Danger
Hazard statements	H301, H302, H319, H331, H350, H400
Precautionary statements	P201, P202, P261, P264, P270, P271, P273, P280, P281, P301+P310, P304+P340, P305+P351+P338, P308+P313, P311, P321, P330, P337+P313, P391, P403+P233, P405, P501
NFPA 704 (fire diamond)	3 2 0
Flash point	85 °C (185 °F; 358 K)
Autoignition temperature	481.67 °C (899.01 °F; 754.82 K)
- Lethal dose or concentration (LD, LC)
LD_{50} (median dose)	900 mg/kg (rat, oral); 323 mg/kg (rabbit, oral)

Related compounds
Related compounds	Toluidine
- Except where otherwise noted, data are given for materials in their standard state (at 25 °C [77 °F], 100 kPa). Infobox references

o-Toluidine (ortho-toluidine) is an organic compound with the chemical formula CH_{3}C_{6}H_{4}NH_{2}. It is the most important of the three isomeric toluidines. It is a colorless liquid although commercial samples are often yellowish. It is a precursor to the herbicides metolachlor and acetochlor.

== Synthesis and reactions ==
o-Toluidine is produced industrially by nitration of toluene to give a mixture of nitrotoluenes, favoring the ortho isomer. This mixture is separated by distillation. 2-Nitrotoluene is hydrogenated to give o-toluidine.

The conversion of o-toluidine to the diazonium salt gives access to the 2-bromo, 2-cyano-, and 2-chlorotoluene derivatives. N-acetylation is also demonstrated.

== Safety ==
The LD50 (oral, rats) is 670 mg/kg.

=== Binding of hemoglobin ===
o-Nitrosotoluene, a metabolite of o-toluidine, converts hemoglobin to methemoglobin, resulting in methemoglobinemia.

o-Nitrosotoluene is suspected of causing bladder cancer in rats. Nitrosotoluene exposure has been researched in a number of different degrees in animals.

In some patients o-toluidine is a metabolite of prilocaine, which may cause methemoglobinemia. This is then treated with methylene blue.

=== Carcinogenicity ===
In the U.S., o-toluidine was first listed in the Third Annual Report on Carcinogens as 'reasonably anticipated to be a human carcinogen' in 1983, based on sufficient evidence from studies in experimental animals. The Report on Carcinogens (RoC) is a U.S. congressionally-mandated, science-based public health report that identifies agents, substances, mixtures, or exposures in the environment that pose a hazard to people residing in the United States Since then, other cancer related studies have been published and the listing of o-toluidine was changed to 'known to be a human carcinogen'. o-toluidine was especially linked to bladder cancer. This was done 31 years later in the Thirteenth Report on Carcinogens (2014). The International Agency for Research on Cancer (IARC) has classified o-toluidine as 'carcinogenic to humans (group 1)'.

=== Metabolism ===
o-Toluidine is absorbed through inhalation and dermal contact as well as from the gastrointestinal tract.

The metabolism of o-toluidine involves many competing activating and deactivating pathways, including N-acetylation, N-oxidation, and N-hydroxylation, and ring oxidation. 4-Hydroxylation and N-acetylation of toluidine are the major metabolic pathways in rats. The primary metabolism of o-toluidine takes place in the endoplasmic reticulum. Exposure to o-toluidine enhances the microsomal activity of aryl hydrocarbon hydroxylase (particularly in the kidney), NADPH-cytochrome c reductase and the content of cytochrome P-450. Cytochrome P450–mediated N-hydroxylation to N-hydroxy-o-toluidine, a carcinogenic metabolite, occurs in the liver. N-Hydroxy-o-toluidine can be either metabolized to o-nitrosotoluene or conjugated with glucuronic acid or sulfate and transported to the urinary bladder via the blood. Once in the bladder, N-hydroxy-o-toluidine can be released from the conjugates in an acidic urine environment to either react directly with DNA or be bio-activated via sulfation or acetylation by cytosolic sulfotransferases or N-acetyltransferases (presumably NAT1). The postulated activated form (based on comparison with other aromatic amines), N-acetoxy-o-toluidine, is a reactive ester that forms electrophilic arylnitrenium ions that can bind to DNA. Other activation pathways (ring-oxidation pathways) for aromatic amines include peroxidase-catalyzed reactions that form reactive metabolites (quinone-imines formed from nonconjugated phenolic metabolites) in the bladder. These metabolites can produce reactive oxygen species, resulting in oxidative cellular damage and compensatory cell proliferation. Support for this mechanism comes from studies of oxidative DNA damage induced by o-toluidine metabolites in cultured human cells (HL-60), calf thymus DNA, and DNA fragments from key genes thought to be involved in carcinogenesis (the c-Ha-ras oncogene and the p53 tumor-suppressor gene). Also supporting this mechanism are observations of o-toluidine-induced DNA damage (strand breaks) in cultured human bladder cells and bladder cells from rats and mice exposed in vivo to o-toluidine.

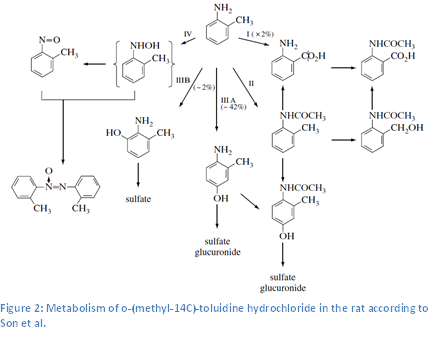
Figure 1: Metabolism of o-(methyl-^{14}C)-toluidine hydrochloride in the rat.

=== Excretion ===
The main excretion pathway is through the urine where up to one-third of the administered compound was recovered unchanged. Major metabolites are 4-amino-m-cresol and to a lesser extent, N-acetyl-4-amino-m-cresol, azoxytoluene, o-nitrosotoluene, N-acetyl-o-toluidine, N-acetyl-o-aminobenzyl alcohol, anthranilic acid, N-acetyl-anthranilic acid, 2-amino-m-cresol, p-hydroxy-o-toluidine. Conjugates that were formed were predominated by sulfate conjugates over glucuronide conjugates by a ratio of 6:1.

=== Related metabolic pathways ===
Prilocaine, an amino amide-type local anesthetic, yields o-toluidine when metabolized by carboxylesterase enzymes. Large prilocaine doses can cause methemoglobinemia due to oxidation of hemoglobin by o-toluidine.

== Drugs List ==
1. Aptocaine
2. Asulacrine
3. Dazepinil
4. Methaqualone
5. Metolazone
6. Prilocaine
7. Quatacaine (Tanacaine)
