= NADPH—cytochrome-c2 reductase =

Identifiers
- EC no.: 1.6.2.5
- CAS no.: 37256-32-9

Databases
- BRENDA: enzyme data
- ExPASy: NiceZyme view
- KEGG: enzyme entry
- MetaCyc: metabolic pathway
- Rhea: reactions
- PDB structures: RCSB PDB PDBe PDBsum
- Gene Ontology: AmiGO / QuickGO
Search
- PMC: articles
- PubMed: articles
- NCBI: proteins

In enzymology, a NADPH—cytochrome-c2 reductase (EC 1.6.2.5) is an enzyme that catalyzes the chemical reaction

NADPH + 2 ferricytochrome c_{2} $\rightleftharpoons$ NADP^{+} + H^{+} + 2 ferrocytochrome c_{2}

Thus, the two substrates of this enzyme are NADPH and ferricytochrome c2, whereas its 3 products are NADP^{+}, H^{+}, and ferrocytochrome c2.

This enzyme belongs to the family of oxidoreductases, specifically those acting on NADH or NADPH with a heme protein as acceptor. The systematic name of this enzyme class is NADPH:ferricytochrome-c2 oxidoreductase. Other names in common use include cytochrome c2 reductase (reduced nicotinamide adenine dinucleotide, phosphate), cytochrome c2 reductase (reduced nicotinamide adenine dinucleotide, and phosphate, NADPH). It employs one cofactor, FAD.
