= Lutidinic acid =

Names
- Preferred IUPAC name Pyridine-2,4-dicarboxylic acid
- Other names 2,4-Pyridinedicarboxylic acid

Identifiers
CAS Number	499-80-9
3D model (JSmol)	Interactive image
Beilstein Reference	131631
ChEBI	CHEBI:44737
ChEMBL	ChEMBL316034
ChemSpider	9938
ECHA InfoCard	100.007.176
EC Number	207-892-2
Gmelin Reference	279731
PubChem CID	10365
UNII	AFI29F0TVL
CompTox Dashboard (EPA)	DTXSID9060104
- InChI: InChI=1S/C7H5NO4/c9-6(10)4-1-2-8-5(3-4)7(11)12/h1-3H,(H,9,10)(H,11,12) Key: MJIVRKPEXXHNJT-UHFFFAOYSA-N
- SMILES: O=C(O)c(c0)nccc0C(O)=O

Properties
Chemical formula	C_{7}H_{5}NO_{4}
Molar mass	167.120 g·mol^{−1}
Melting point	242–243 °C (468–469 °F; 515–516 K)

Hazards
- GHS labelling
Pictograms	(GHS07: Exclamation mark)
Signal word	Warning
Hazard statements	H315, H319, H335
Precautionary statements	P261, P264, P271, P280, P302+P352, P304+P340, P305+P351+P338, P312, P321, P332+P313, P337+P313, P362, P403+P233, P405, P501

Related compounds
Related compounds	Quinolinic acid; Cinchomeronic acid; Isocinchomeronic acid; Dipicolinic acid; Dinicotinic acid
- Except where otherwise noted, data are given for materials in their standard state (at 25 °C [77 °F], 100 kPa). Infobox references

Lutidinic acid (pyridine-2,4-dicarboxylic acid) is a heterocyclic organic compound, more precisely a heteroaromatic. It belongs to the group of pyridine dicarboxylic acids and consists of a pyridine ring which carries two carboxy groups in the 2- and 4-position.
