= Mononitrotoluene =

Mononitrotoluene or nitrotoluene (MNT or NT), is any of three organic compounds with the formula C_{6}H_{4}(CH_{3})(NO_{2}). They can be viewed as nitro derivatives of toluene or as methylated derivatives of nitrobenzene.

Mononitrotoluene comes in four isomers, differing by the relative position of the methyl and nitro groups. All are pale yellow with faint fragrances:

- ortho-nitrotoluene (also called ONT, o-nitrotoluene, or 2-nitrotoluene). m.p. = −10.4 °C
- meta-nitrotoluene (MNT, m-nitrotoluene, or 3-nitrotoluene). m.p. = 16 °C
- para-nitrotoluene (PNT, p-nitrotoluene, or 4-nitrotoluene). m.p. = 51 °C
- α-nitrotoluene, in which the benzylic carbon is nitrated. m.p. = 80.7 °C.

Typical use of nitrotoluene is in production of pigments, antioxidants, agricultural chemicals, and photographic chemicals.

Ortho-mononitrotoluene and para-mononitrotoluene can be also used as detection taggants for explosive detection.

== See also ==
- Toluene
- Dinitrotoluene
- Nitrobenzene
- Trinitrotoluene
