= 4-Nitrobenzoic acid =

Names
- Preferred IUPAC name 4-Nitrobenzoic acid
- Other names p-Nitrobenzoic acid

Identifiers
CAS Number	62-23-7
3D model (JSmol)	Interactive image
ChEBI	CHEBI:262350
ChEMBL	ChEMBL101263
ChemSpider	5882
ECHA InfoCard	100.000.479
PubChem CID	6108
UNII	G83NWR61OW
CompTox Dashboard (EPA)	DTXSID3020966
- InChI: InChI=1S/C7H5NO4/c9-7(10)5-1-3-6(4-2-5)8(11)12/h1-4H,(H,9,10) Key: OTLNPYWUJOZPPA-UHFFFAOYSA-N; InChI=1/C7H5NO4/c9-7(10)5-1-3-6(4-2-5)8(11)12/h1-4H,(H,9,10) Key: OTLNPYWUJOZPPA-UHFFFAOYAB
- SMILES: O=[N+]([O-])c1ccc(C(=O)O)cc1

Properties
Chemical formula	C_{7}H_{5}NO_{4}
Molar mass	167.120 g·mol^{−1}
Appearance	Light yellow crystalline powder
Density	1.58
Melting point	237 °C (459 °F; 510 K)
Boiling point	Sublimes
Solubility in water	<0.1 g/100 mL at 26 °C
Acidity (pK_{a})	3.41 (in water), 9.1 (in DMSO)
Magnetic susceptibility (χ)	−78.81·10^{−6} cm^{3}/mol

Related compounds
Related compounds	Benzoic acid Nitrobenzene; Anthranilic acid 3,5-Dinitrobenzoic acid, 3-Nitrobenzoic acid, 2-Nitrobenzoic acid
- Except where otherwise noted, data are given for materials in their standard state (at 25 °C [77 °F], 100 kPa). verify (what is ?) Infobox references

4-Nitrobenzoic acid is an organic compound with the formula C_{6}H_{4}(NO_{2})CO_{2}H. It is a pale yellow solid. It is a precursor to 4-nitrobenzoyl chloride, the precursor to the anesthetic procaine and folic acid. It is also a precursor to 4-aminobenzoic acid.

== Production ==
4-Nitrobenzoic acid is prepared by oxidation of 4-nitrotoluene using oxygen or dichromate as oxidants.

Alternatively, it has been prepared by nitration of polystyrene followed by oxidation of the alkyl substituent. This method proceeds with improved para/ortho selectivity owing to the steric protection of the ortho positions by the polymer backbone.

== Safety ==
This compound has a rat LD_{50} of 1960 mg/kg.
