= Methyl isonicotinate =

Names
- Preferred IUPAC name Methyl pyridine-4-carboxylate

Identifiers
CAS Number	2459-09-8
3D model (JSmol)	Interactive image
ChEMBL	ChEMBL2251612
ChemSpider	197537
ECHA InfoCard	100.017.770
EC Number	219-546-8
PubChem CID	227085
UNII	AH74GPR4IK
CompTox Dashboard (EPA)	DTXSID9062433
- InChI: Key: OLXYLDUSSBULGU-UHFFFAOYSA-N; InChI=1S/C7H7NO2/c1-10-7(9)6-2-4-8-5-3-6/h2-5H,1H3
- SMILES: COC(=O)C1=CC=NC=C1

Properties
Chemical formula	C_{7}H_{7}NO_{2}
Molar mass	137.138 g·mol^{−1}
Appearance	Orange/brown
Melting point	16.1 °C (61.0 °F; 289.2 K)
Boiling point	208.0 °C (406.4 °F; 481.1 K)

Hazards
- Occupational safety and health (OHS/OSH)
Main hazards	Toxic
- GHS labelling
Pictograms	(GHS07: Exclamation mark)
Signal word	Warning
Hazard statements	H315, H319, H335
Precautionary statements	P261, P264, P271, P280, P302+P352, P304+P340, P305+P351+P338, P312, P321, P332+P313, P337+P313, P362, P403+P233, P405, P501
- Except where otherwise noted, data are given for materials in their standard state (at 25 °C [77 °F], 100 kPa). Infobox references

Methyl isonicotinate is a toxic compound, which is used as a semiochemical. Other names for this compound are 4-pyridine carboxylic acid, and isonicotinic acid methyl ester. This compound is slightly toxic to the human body. It has an irritating effect on the eyes, skin, and respiratory tract. Moreover, the compound is used as the active ingredient in several sticky thrips traps to monitor and catch thrips in greenhouses.

== History ==
Methyl isonicotinate, a patented 4-pyridyl carbonyl compound, was found to be a useful semiochemical that does not use any type of pheromone. Research has been performed to investigate how this chemical can be used for the management of thrip-pests.

== Structure and reactivity ==
Methyl isonicotinate is a 4-pyridyl carbonyl compound consisting of a pyridine ring attached to a methyl ester group. No data were available for the reactivity of methyl isonicotinate.

== Synthesis ==
In order to synthesize methyl isonicotinate several substances need to react with one another. These compounds are isonicotinic acid, methanol, sulfuric acid, and sodium carbonate.

== Mechanism of action ==
Methyl isonicotinate influences the movement of thrips.

== Uses ==
Methyl isonicotinate is used as a laboratory chemical, where it aids in the synthesis of other substances.

== Efficacy and side effects ==
=== Efficacy ===
Sticky blue and yellow thrip traps are used to monitor pests on crops. Methyl isonicotinate is the active ingredient in for example LUREM-TR (Koppers biological systems) and is used to detect a pest in an early stage. The addition of methyl isonicotinate to thrip control methods can increase the success of the trap. The compound affects the movement of thrips as walking and take-off behavior increases. More movement leads to more captured thrips on sticky traps. Usage of methyl isonicotinate in traps can increase the catches up to 20 times depending on the species and the conditions. In addition, the increased movement of thrips increases the exposure of the species to insecticides or biopesticides.

There are 10 thrip species known to react to methyl isonicotinate:

Thrips species
Frankliniella occidentalis (Western flower thrips)
Frankliniella schultzei (common blossom thrips)
Hydatothrips adolfifriderici
Megalurothrips sjostedti (bean flower thrips)
Thrips coloratus (loquat thrips)
Thrips imaginis (plague thrips)
Thrips major (rose thrips)
Thrips obscuratus (NZ flower thrips)
Thrips tabaci (onion thrips)
Thrips palmi (melon thrips)

=== Adverse effects ===
Methyl isonicotinate is known for causing skin corrosion. In low concentration, this compound leads to irritation of the skin. An acute symptom is redness of the skin, but the effects of the substance can be delayed. If the skin has been in contact with the substance, the skin should be flushed with running water for at least 20 minutes and the person should see a doctor. In addition, it causes significant damage to the eye. When the eye has been contaminated with this compound, flush the eyes with running water for a minimum of 15 minutes straight away. During this process, the eyelids should be open. After, it is advised that the person should call an emergency medical center. Also, the respiratory tract may be affected when the system comes in contact with large amounts of methyl isonicotinate. Medical attention is needed. After overexposure one might experience nausea, a headache, dizziness, tiredness, or even vomiting. Lastly, methyl isonicotinate is a combustible liquid.

== Toxicity ==
There are different studies performed on the acute toxicity of methyl isonicotinate. The acute toxicity relates to effects that occur after exposure to a substance or mixture. In the studies on acute toxicity of methyl isonicotinate, the effects were observed in vivo in rodents.

=== Oral toxicity studies in rats ===
To examine the oral toxicity of methyl isonicotinate, studies were performed to estimate the LD_{50}. Based on the studies supported by Tsarichenko (1977), U.S. Library of Medicine (2017) and Gestis Substance Database (2017), Sprague-Dawley male and female rats were treated with methyl isonicotinate by oral gavage route. According to the estimated LD_{50} of 3906 mg/kg, methyl isonicotinate is classified as category V on GLP criteria for acute oral toxicity. Category V substances are identified as causing relatively low acute toxicity hazard. However, the substances could present a danger to vulnerable populations. In a treatment with isonicotinate acid, the rats showed clinical signs such as suppression of the general motor activity, an impairment of motor coordination and an assumption of a lateral position. These signs were all observed at a LD_{50} of 5000 mg/kg.

=== Dermal toxicity in rabbits ===
The dermal toxicity was estimated based on a study supported by Cosmetic ingredient review (2005) on methyl isonicotinate. In this study, rabbits were used to estimate the LD_{50} for the dermal toxicity of methyl isonicotinate. The rabbits were treated with methyl isonicotinate by dermal application. This study resulted in an estimated LD_{50} of 3828 mg/kg. Conclusively, methyl isonicotinate can be classified as category V for acute dermal toxicity.

Overview Exposure Acute Toxic Level LD_{50}
Animal species	Sex	Treatment	LD_{50} (mg/kg)
Sprague-Dawley rat	male/female	Oral	3906
Rabbit	male/female	Dermal	3828

== Effects on animals ==
The European Chemicals Agency (ECHA) mentions some effects on animals: Short term toxicity to aquatic invertebrates, aquatic algae, cyanobacteria, and micro-organisms. No other effects on animals were found during the data-search. Furthermore, as mentioned before, the compound can serve as a semiochemical in thrips, affecting their movement and therefore increasing the functionality of traps.
