= Dipicolinic acid =

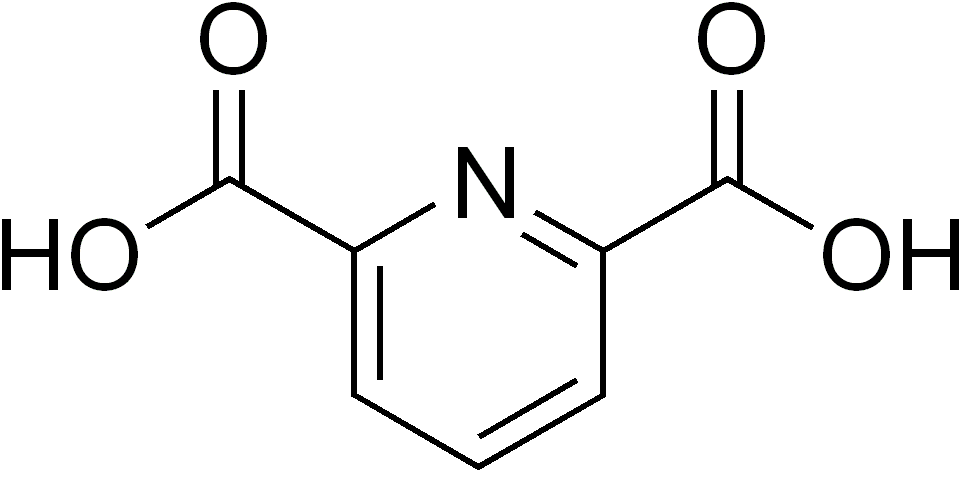

Names
- Preferred IUPAC name Pyridine-2,6-dicarboxylic acid
- Other names 2,6-Pyridinedicarboxylic acid

Identifiers
CAS Number	499-83-2
3D model (JSmol)	Interactive image
Beilstein Reference	131629
ChEBI	CHEBI:46837
ChEMBL	ChEMBL284104
ChemSpider	9940
DrugBank	DB04267
ECHA InfoCard	100.007.178
EC Number	207-894-3
Gmelin Reference	50798
PubChem CID	10367
UNII	UE81S5CQ0G
CompTox Dashboard (EPA)	DTXSID7022043
- InChI: InChI=1S/C7H5NO4/c9-6(10)4-2-1-3-5(8-4)7(11)12/h1-3H,(H,9,10)(H,11,12) Key: WJJMNDUMQPNECX-UHFFFAOYSA-N; InChI=1/C7H5NO4/c9-6(10)4-2-1-3-5(8-4)7(11)12/h1-3H,(H,9,10)(H,11,12) Key: WJJMNDUMQPNECX-UHFFFAOYAM
- SMILES: c1cc(nc(c1)C(=O)O)C(=O)O

Properties
Chemical formula	C_{7}H_{5}NO_{4}
Molar mass	167.120 g·mol^{−1}
Melting point	248 to 250 °C (478 to 482 °F; 521 to 523 K)

Hazards
- GHS labelling
Pictograms	(GHS07: Exclamation mark)
Signal word	Warning
Hazard statements	H315, H319, H335

Related compounds
Related compounds	Quinolinic acid; Lutidinic acid; Isocinchomeronic acid; Cinchomeronic acid; Dinicotinic acid
- Except where otherwise noted, data are given for materials in their standard state (at 25 °C [77 °F], 100 kPa). verify (what is ?) Infobox references

Dipicolinic acid (pyridine-2,6-dicarboxylic acid or PDC and DPA) is a chemical compound which plays a role in the heat resistance of bacterial endospores. It is also used to prepare dipicolinato ligated lanthanide and transition metal complexes for ion chromatography.

== Biological role ==
Dipicolinic acid composes 5% to 15% of the dry weight of Bacillus subtilis spores. It has been implicated as responsible for the heat resistance of the endospore, although mutants resistant to heat but lacking dipicolinic acid have been isolated, suggesting other mechanisms contributing to heat resistance are at work. Two genera of bacterial pathogens are known to produce endospores: the aerobic Bacillus and anaerobic Clostridium.

Dipicolinic acid forms a complex with calcium ions within the endospore core. This complex binds free water molecules, causing dehydration of the spore. As a result, the heat resistance of macromolecules within the core increases. The calcium-dipicolinic acid complex also functions to protect DNA from heat denaturation by inserting itself between the nucleobases, thereby increasing the stability of DNA.

== Detection ==
The high concentration of DPA in and specificity to bacterial endospores has long made it a prime target in analytical methods for the detection and measurement of bacterial endospores. A particularly important development in this area was the demonstration by Rosen et al. of an assay for DPA based on photoluminescence in the presence of terbium, although this phenomenon was first investigated for using DPA in an assay for terbium by Barela and Sherry.

== Environmental behavior ==
Simple substituted pyridines vary significantly in environmental fate characteristics, such as volatility, adsorption, and biodegradation. Dipicolinic acid is among the least volatile, least adsorbed by soil, and most rapidly degraded of the simple pyridines. A number of studies have confirmed dipicolinic acid is biodegradable in aerobic and anaerobic environments, which is consistent with the widespread occurrence of the compound in nature. With a high solubility (5g/liter) and limited sorption (estimated Koc = 1.86), utilization of dipicolinic acid as a growth substrate by microorganisms is not limited by bioavailability in nature.

== See also ==
- Dinicotinic acid, an isomeric dicarboxylic acid
- 2,6-Pyridinedicarbothioic acid has both -COOH (carboxylic acid) groups replaced by -COSH (thiocarboxylic acid) groups
