= 3-Aminobenzoic acid =

Skeletal formula
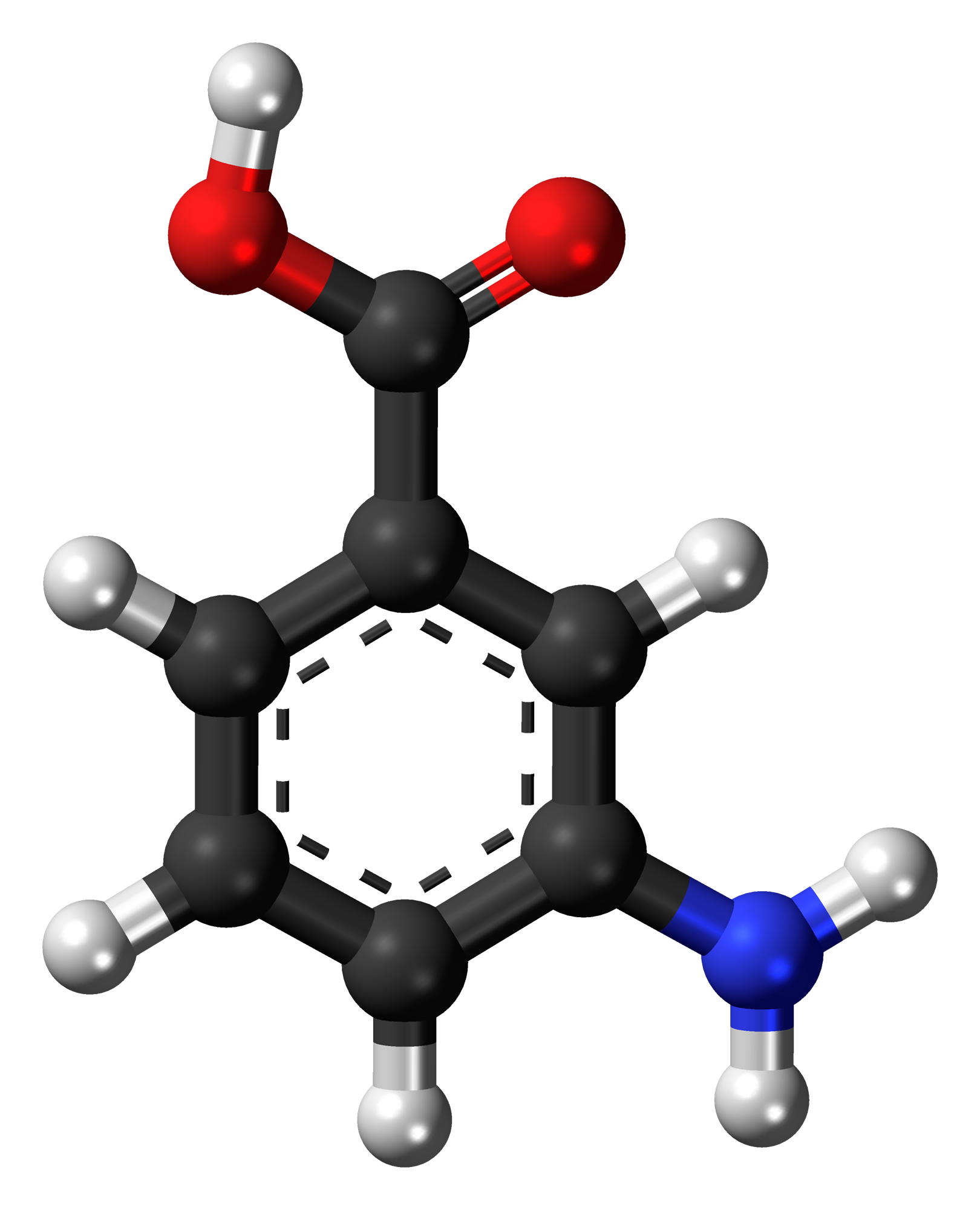
Ball-and-stick model

Names
- Preferred IUPAC name 3-Aminobenzoic acid
- Other names meta-Aminobenzoic acid m-Aminobenzoic acid MABA; 3-Carboxyaniline m-Carboxyaniline

Identifiers
CAS Number	99-05-8
3D model (JSmol)	Interactive image
ChEBI	CHEBI:42682
ChEMBL	ChEMBL307782
ChemSpider	7141
DrugBank	DB02054
ECHA InfoCard	100.002.477
EC Number	202-724-4
PubChem CID	7419
UNII	G2X3B3O37U
CompTox Dashboard (EPA)	DTXSID3059183
- InChI: InChI=1S/C7H7NO2/c8-6-3-1-2-5(4-6)7(9)10/h1-4H,8H2,(H,9,10) Key: XFDUHJPVQKIXHO-UHFFFAOYSA-N; InChI=1/C7H7NO2/c8-6-3-1-2-5(4-6)7(9)10/h1-4H,8H2,(H,9,10) Key: XFDUHJPVQKIXHO-UHFFFAOYAM
- SMILES: O=C(O)c1cc(N)ccc1

Properties
Chemical formula	C_{7}H_{7}NO_{2}
Molar mass	137.13598
Appearance	White solid
Density	1.51 g/cm^{3}
Melting point	178 to 180 °C (352 to 356 °F; 451 to 453 K)
Acidity (pK_{a})	3.07 (carboxyl; H_{2}O); 4.79 (amino; H_{2}O)

Hazards
- GHS labelling
Pictograms	(GHS07: Exclamation mark)
Signal word	Warning
Hazard statements	H302, H315, H319, H335
Precautionary statements	P261, P264, P270, P271, P280, P301+P312, P302+P352, P304+P340, P305+P351+P338, P312, P321, P330, P332+P313, P337+P313, P362, P403+P233, P405, P501
- Except where otherwise noted, data are given for materials in their standard state (at 25 °C [77 °F], 100 kPa). verify (what is ?) Infobox references

3-Aminobenzoic acid (also known as meta-aminobenzoic acid or MABA) is an organic compound with the molecular formula H_{2}NC_{6}H_{4}CO_{2}H. MABA is a white solid, although commercial samples are often colored. It is only slightly soluble in water. It is soluble in acetone, boiling water, hot alcohol, hot chloroform and ether. It consists of a benzene ring substituted with an amino group and a carboxylic acid.

It is prepared by reduction of 3-nitrobenzoic acid. It is used to prepare some dyes.

== See also ==
- Aminomethylbenzoic acid
- Anthranilic acid (2-aminobenzoic acid)
- 4-Aminobenzoic acid
- Arene substitution pattern
- Non-proteinogenic amino acids
