= 3-Nitrobenzoic acid =

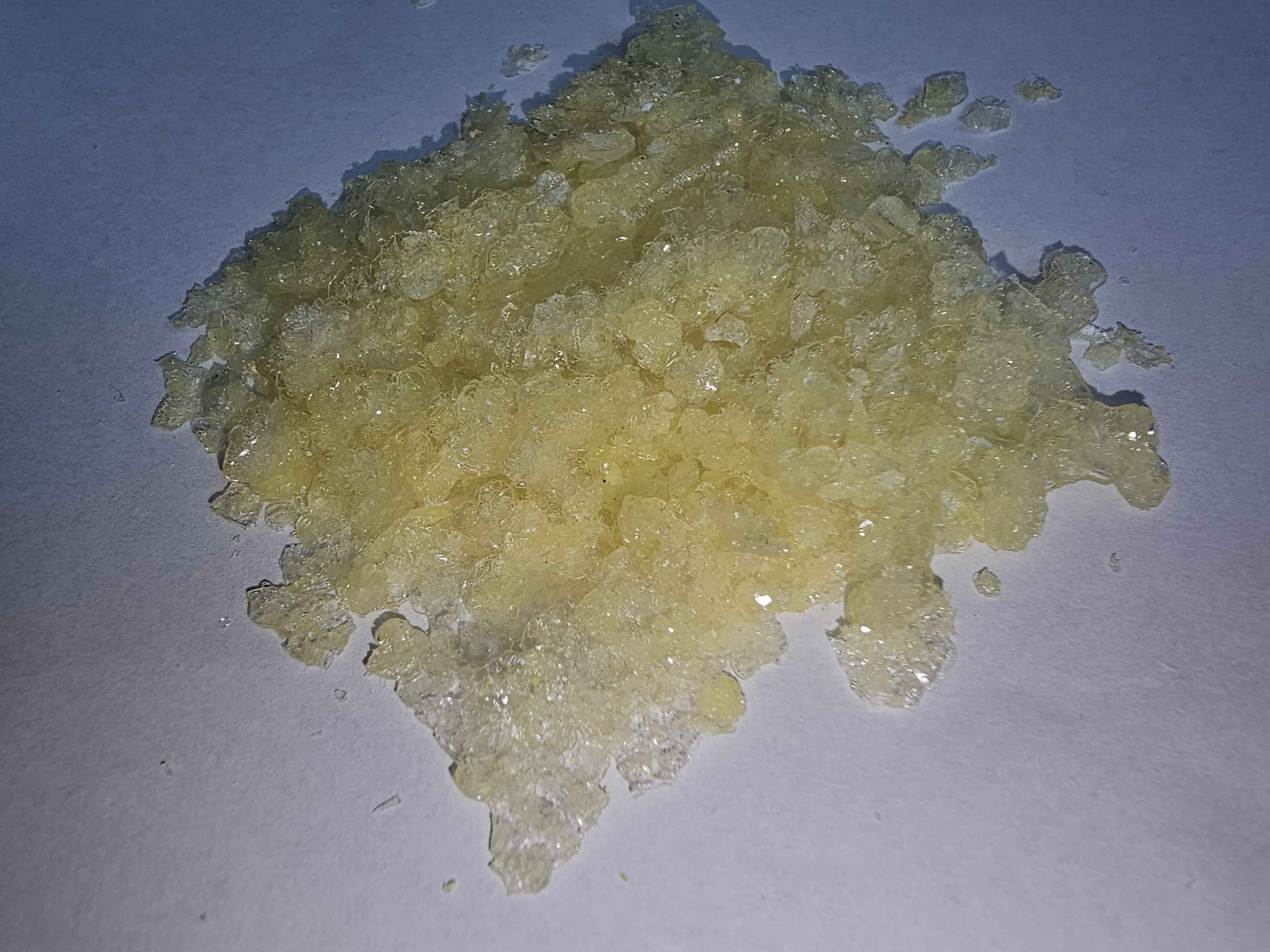

Skeletal formula
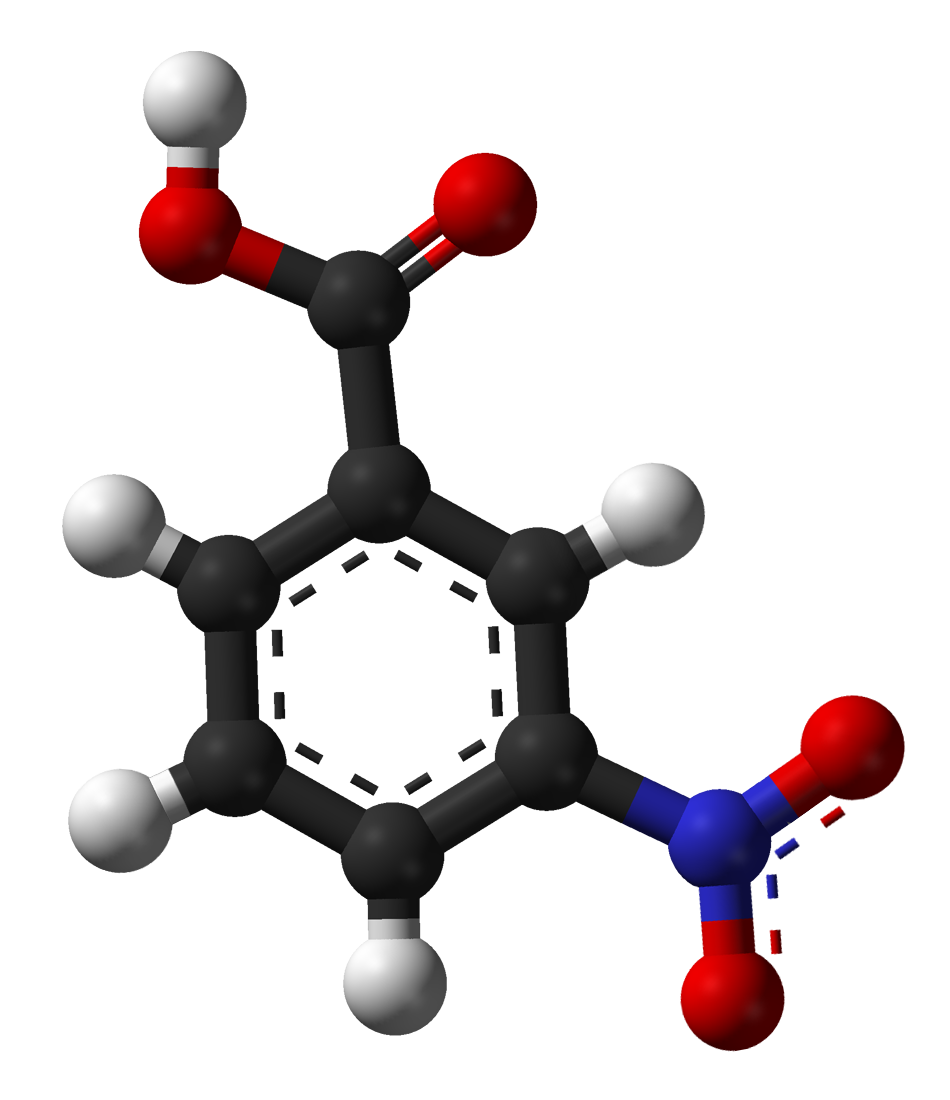
Ball-and-stick model

Names
- Preferred IUPAC name 3-Nitrobenzoic acid
- Other names m-Nitrobenzoic acid

Identifiers
CAS Number	121-92-6
3D model (JSmol)	Interactive image
ChEBI	CHEBI:231494
ChEMBL	ChEMBL274839
ChemSpider	8183
ECHA InfoCard	100.004.099
PubChem CID	8497
UNII	H318ZW7612
CompTox Dashboard (EPA)	DTXSID0025737
- InChI: InChI=1S/C7H5NO4/c9-7(10)5-2-1-3-6(4-5)8(11)12/h1-4H,(H,9,10) Key: AFPHTEQTJZKQAQ-UHFFFAOYSA-N; InChI=1/C7H5NO4/c9-7(10)5-2-1-3-6(4-5)8(11)12/h1-4H,(H,9,10) Key: AFPHTEQTJZKQAQ-UHFFFAOYAS
- SMILES: O=[N+]([O-])c1cc(C(=O)O)ccc1

Properties
Chemical formula	C_{7}H_{5}NO_{4}
Molar mass	167.120 g·mol^{−1}
Appearance	cream-colored solid
Density	1.494 g/cm^{3}
Melting point	139 to 141 °C (282 to 286 °F; 412 to 414 K)
Solubility in water	0.24 g/100 mL (15 °C)
Acidity (pK_{a})	3.47 (in water)
Magnetic susceptibility (χ)	−80.22·10^{−6} cm^{3}/mol

Related compounds
Related compounds	Benzoic acid Nitrobenzene; Anthranilic acid 3,5-Dinitrobenzoic acid 2-Nitrobenzoic acid 4-Nitrobenzoic acid
- Except where otherwise noted, data are given for materials in their standard state (at 25 °C [77 °F], 100 kPa). verify (what is ?) Infobox references

3-Nitrobenzoic acid is an organic compound with the formula C_{6}H_{4}(NO_{2})CO_{2}H. It is an aromatic compound and under standard conditions, it is an off-white solid. The two substituents are in a meta position with respect to each other, giving the alternative name of m-nitrobenzoic acid. This compound can be useful as it is a precursor to 3-aminobenzoic acid, which is used to prepare some dyes.

== Preparation ==
It is prepared by nitration of benzoic acid at low temperatures. Both 2-Nitrobenzoic acid and 4-Nitrobenzoic acid are produced as side products, with yields of approximately 20% and 1.5% respectively. Since carboxylic acid functional groups are electron withdrawing, during an electrophilic aromatic substitution reaction of nitration, substituents are directed to a meta position which explains this regiochemistry.

A less efficient route involves nitration of methyl benzoate, followed by hydrolysis. Alternatively, oxidative C-C bond cleavage of 3-nitroacetophenone to the corresponding aryl carboxylic acid, has been demonstrated. A further synthesis involves the oxidation of 3-nitrobenzaldehyde.

== Properties ==
With a pK_{a} of 3.47, 3-nitrobenzoic acid is about ten times more acidic than benzoic acid. The conjugate base of benzoic acid is stabilised by the presence of the electron withdrawing nitro group which explains its increased acidity in comparison to unsubstituted benzoic acid. It is typically soluble in oxygenated and chlorinated solvents.

== Reactivity ==
The presence of both carboxylic acid and nitro functional groups deactivate the ring with respect to electrophilic aromatic substitution reactions. Hydrogenation gives 3-aminobenzoic acid.

== Safety ==
The compound is likely of modest toxicity, with LD_{50} (i.v., mouse) of 640 mg/kg. This compound can cause skin and eye irritation with symptoms of exposure including methemoglobin, sensitisation, irritation, and corneal damage.
