= Toluidine =

Group of chemical compounds: aryl amines

There are three isomers of toluidine, which are organic compounds discovered and named by James Sheridan Muspratt and August Wilhelm von Hofmann in 1845. These isomers are o-toluidine, m-toluidine, and p-toluidine, with the prefixed letter abbreviating, respectively, ortho; meta; and para. All three are aryl amines whose chemical structures are similar to aniline except that a methyl group is substituted onto the benzene ring. The difference between these three isomers is the position where the methyl group (–CH_{3}) is bonded to the ring relative to the amino functional group (–NH_{2}); see illustration of the chemical structures below.

Toluidine isomers
Methyl position	ortho	meta	para
Common name	o-toluidine	m-toluidine	p-toluidine
Other names	o-methylaniline	m-methylaniline	p-methylaniline
Chemical name	2-methylaniline	3-methylaniline	4-methylaniline
Chemical formula	C_{7}H_{9}N		
Molecular mass	107.17 g/mol		
Glass transition temperature	189 K	187 K	Glass not formed
Melting point	−23 °C	−30 °C	43 °C
Boiling point	199–200 °C	203–204 °C	200 °C
Density	1.00 g/cm^{3}	0.98 g/cm^{3}	1.05 g/cm^{3}
Magnetic susceptibility	76.0 × 10^{−6} cm^{3}/mol	74.6 × 10^{−6} cm^{3}/mol	72.1 × 10^{−6} cm^{3}/mol
CAS number	[95-53-4]	[108-44-1]	[106-49-0]
SMILES	Cc1ccccc1N	Cc1cccc(N)c1	Cc1ccc(N)cc1
Disclaimer and references

The chemical properties of the toluidines are quite similar to those of aniline, and toluidines have properties in common with other aromatic amines. Due to the amino group bonded to the aromatic ring, the toluidines are weakly basic. The toluidines are poorly soluble in pure water but dissolve well in acidic water due to formation of ammonium salts, as usual for organic amines. ortho- and meta-toluidines are viscous liquids, but para-toluidine is a flaky solid. This difference is related to the fact that the p-toluidine molecules are more symmetrical. p-Toluidine can be obtained from reduction of p-nitrotoluene. p-Toluidine reacts with formaldehyde to form Tröger's base.

== Uses and occurrence ==
The ortho isomer is produced on the largest scale. Its primary application is as a precursor to the pesticides metolachlor and acetochlor. The other toluidine isomers are used in the production of dyes such as Allura Red AC (Red 40, E129) and azorubine (carmoisine, E122). They are a component of accelerators for cyanoacrylate glues.

Mauveine is an aniline dye whose synthesis in 1856 launched a productive and profitable era of organic chemistry. Mauvine is mainly a derivative of o- and p-toluidines, common impurities in aniline.

mauveine A, a major component of mauvine

mauveine B, a major component of mauvine
