= 4-Nitrotoluene =

Names
- Preferred IUPAC name 1-Methyl-4-nitrobenzene
- Other names p-nitrotoluene p-mononitrotoluene p-methylnitrobenzene

Identifiers
CAS Number	99-99-0
3D model (JSmol)	Interactive image
ChemSpider	13863774
ECHA InfoCard	100.002.553
PubChem CID	7473
UNII	E88IMG14EX
CompTox Dashboard (EPA)	DTXSID5023792
- InChI: InChI=1S/C7H7NO2/c1-6-2-4-7(5-3-6)8(9)10/h2-5H,1H3 Key: ZPTVNYMJQHSSEA-UHFFFAOYSA-N
- SMILES: O=[N+]([O-])c1ccc(C)cc1

Properties
Chemical formula	C_{7}H_{7}NO_{2}
Molar mass	137.138 g·mol^{−1}
Appearance	crystalline solid
Odor	weak, aromatic
Density	1.1038 g·cm^{−3} (75 °C)
Melting point	51.63 °C (124.93 °F; 324.78 K)
Boiling point	238.3 °C (460.9 °F; 511.4 K)
Solubility in water	0.04% (20°C)
Vapor pressure	0.1 mmHg (20°C)
Magnetic susceptibility (χ)	−72.06·10^{−6} cm^{3}/mol

Hazards
- Occupational safety and health (OHS/OSH)
Main hazards	moderately toxic
- GHS labelling
Pictograms	(GHS06: Toxic) (GHS08: Health hazard) (GHS09: Environmental hazard)
Signal word	Danger
Hazard statements	H301, H311, H331, H373, H411
Precautionary statements	P260, P262, P264, P270, P271, P273, P280, P301+P316, P302+P352, P304+P340, P316, P319, P321, P330, P361+P364, P391, P403+P233, P405, P501
Flash point	106 °C; 223 °F; 379 K
Explosive limits	1.6%–?
- Lethal dose or concentration (LD, LC)
LD_{50} (median dose)	1231 mg/kg (mouse, oral); 1330 mg/kg (rat, oral); 1450 mg/kg (rabbit, oral)
- NIOSH (US health exposure limits)
PEL (Permissible)	TWA 5 ppm (30 mg/m^{3}) [skin]
REL (Recommended)	TWA 2 ppm (11 mg/m^{3}) [skin]
IDLH (Immediate danger)	200 ppm
- Except where otherwise noted, data are given for materials in their standard state (at 25 °C [77 °F], 100 kPa). Infobox references

4-Nitrotoluene or para-nitrotoluene is an organic compound with the formula CH_{3}C_{6}H_{4}NO_{2}. It is a pale yellow solid. It is one of three isomers of nitrotoluene.

== Synthesis and reactions ==
Together with other isomers, 4-nitrotoluene is prepared by nitration of toluene, commonly using titanium(IV) nitrate. It undergoes the reactions typical for nitrobenzene derivatives, e.g. hydrogenation gives p-toluidine.

Oxidation of the methyl substituent of 4-nitrotoluene has been extensively investigated. Depending on the conditions, oxidation yields 4-nitrobenzaldehyde diacetate, 4-nitrobenzenoic acid, and 4,4'-dinitrobibenzyl. Treatment of 4-nitrotoluene with bromine gives the 4-nitrobenzyl bromide.

== Applications ==
The principal application involves its sulfonation to give the 4-nitrotoluene-2-sulfonic acid (with the –SO_{3}H group adjacent to methyl). This species can be oxidatively coupled to produce stilbene derivatives, which are used as dyes. Representative derivatives include the molecular and salt forms of 4,4'-dinitroso- and the 4,4'-dinitro-2,2'-stilbenedisulfonic acids, e.g. disodium 4,4'-dinitrostilbene-2,2'-disulfonate.

A couple of uses include the synthesis of procainamide (the methyl group is oxidized to 4-nitrobenzoic acid), and in the synthesis of chlorotoluron.

== Safety ==
Evidence exists for toxicity and carcinogenicity in mice.
