= 2-Nitrotoluene =

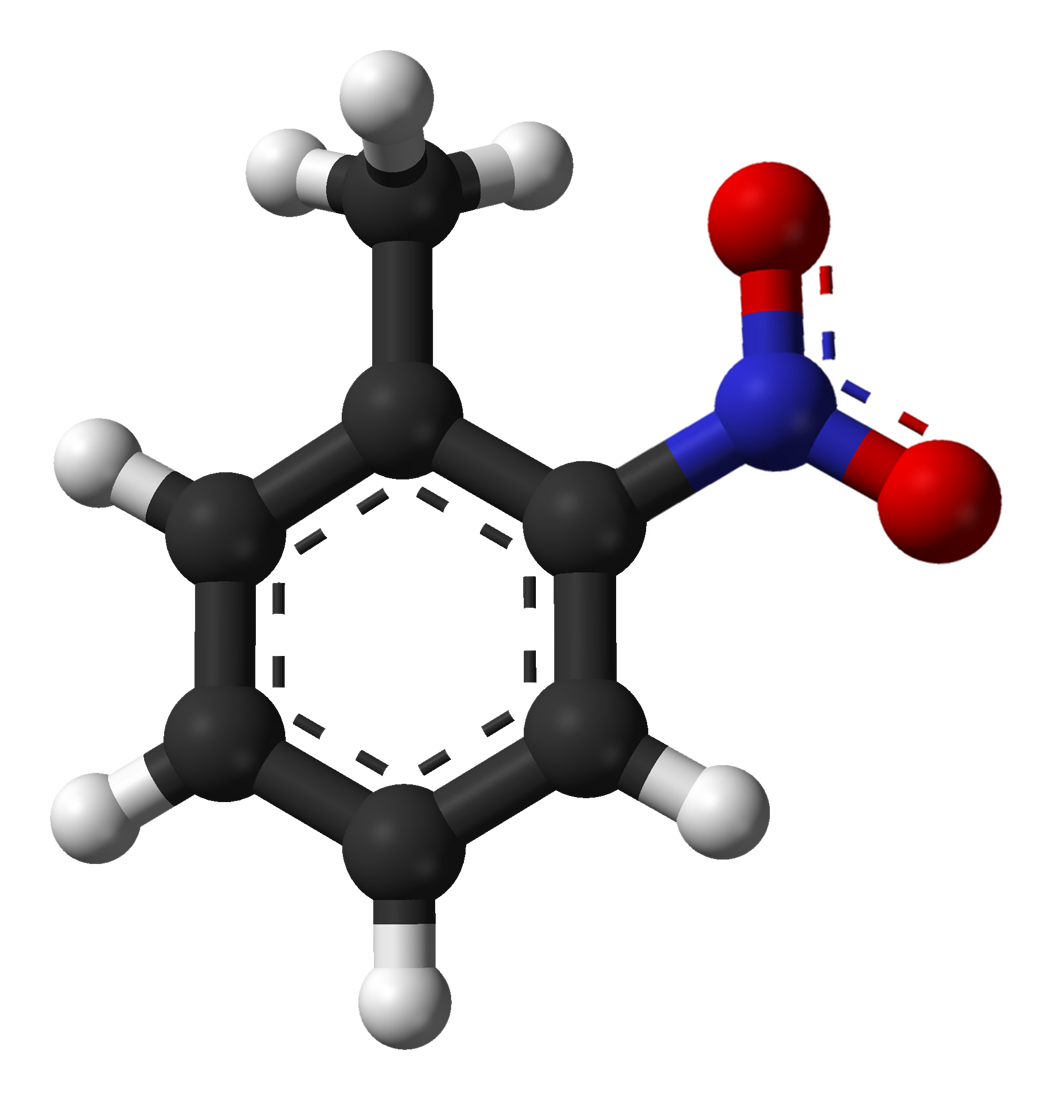

Names
- Preferred IUPAC name 1-Methyl-2-nitrobenzene
- Other names o-Nitrotoluene, o-Methylnitrobenzene, 2-Methylnitrobenzene, ortho-Nitrotoluene

Identifiers
CAS Number	88-72-2
3D model (JSmol)	Interactive image
ChEBI	CHEBI:33098
ChEMBL	ChEMBL47047
ChemSpider	21106144
ECHA InfoCard	100.001.685
EC Number	201-853-3
KEGG	C19597
PubChem CID	6944
RTECS number	XT3150000
UNII	6Q9N88YIAY
UN number	1664
CompTox Dashboard (EPA)	DTXSID4025791
- InChI: InChI=1S/C7H7NO2/c1-6-4-2-3-5-7(6)8(9)10/h2-5H,1H3 Key: PLAZTCDQAHEYBI-UHFFFAOYSA-N; InChI=1S/C7H7NO2/c1-6-4-2-3-5-7(6)8(9)10/h2-5H,1H3 Key: PLAZTCDQAHEYBI-UHFFFAOYSA-N; InChI=1S/C7H7NO2/c1-6-4-2-3-5-7(6)8(9)10/h2-5H,1H3
- SMILES: Cc1ccccc1[N+](=O)[O-]

Properties
Chemical formula	C_{7}H_{7}NO_{2}
Molar mass	137.138 g·mol^{−1}
Appearance	yellow liquid
Odor	weak, aromatic
Density	1.1611 g·cm^{−3} @ 19°C
Melting point	−10.4 °C (13.3 °F; 262.8 K)
Boiling point	222 °C (432 °F; 495 K)
Solubility in water	0.07% (20°C)
Vapor pressure	0.1 mmHg (20°C)
Magnetic susceptibility (χ)	−72.28·10^{−6} cm^{3}/mol

Hazards
- GHS labelling
Pictograms	(GHS07: Exclamation mark) (GHS08: Health hazard) (GHS09: Environmental hazard)
Signal word	Danger
Hazard statements	H302, H340, H350, H361, H411
Precautionary statements	P201, P202, P264, P270, P273, P281, P301+P312, P308+P313, P330, P391, P405, P501
NFPA 704 (fire diamond)	3 1 1
Flash point	106 °C; 223 °F; 379 K
Explosive limits	2.2%-?
- Lethal dose or concentration (LD, LC)
LD_{50} (median dose)	891 mg/kg (oral, rat); 970 mg/kg (oral, mouse); 1750 mg/kg (oral, rabbit)
- NIOSH (US health exposure limits)
PEL (Permissible)	TWA 5 ppm (30 mg/m^{3}) [skin]
REL (Recommended)	TWA 2 ppm (11 mg/m^{3}) [skin]
IDLH (Immediate danger)	200 ppm
- Except where otherwise noted, data are given for materials in their standard state (at 25 °C [77 °F], 100 kPa). verify (what is ?) Infobox references

2-Nitrotoluene or ortho-nitrotoluene is an organic compound with the formula CH_{3}C_{6}H_{4}NO_{2}. It is pale yellow liquid that crystallizes in two forms, called α (−9.27 °C) and β (−3.17 °C). It is mainly a precursor to o-toluidine, which is an intermediate in the production of various dyes.

== Synthesis and reactions ==
It is made by nitrating toluene at above −10 °C. This reaction affords a 2:1 mixture of 2-nitro and 4-nitro isomers.

Chlorination of 2-nitrotoluene gives two isomers of the chloronitrotoluenes. Similarly nitration gives two isomers of dinitrotoluene.

2-Nitrotoluene is mainly consumed in the production of o-toluidine, a precursor to dyes.
