= Climate change and insurance in the United States =

Effects of climate change on insurance markets in the United States

The effects of climate change on extreme weather events is requiring the insurance industry in the United States to recalculate risk assessments for various lines of insurance. From 1980 to 2005, private and federal government insurers in the United States paid $320 billion in constant 2005 dollars in claims due to weather-related losses while the total amount paid in claims annually generally increased, and 88% of all property insurance losses in the United States from 1980 to 2005 were weather-related. Annual insured natural catastrophe losses in the United States grew 10-fold in inflation-adjusted terms from $49 billion in total from 1959 to 1988 to $98 billion in total from 1989 to 1998, while the ratio of premium revenue to natural catastrophe losses fell six-fold from 1971 to 1999 and natural catastrophe losses were the primary factor in 10% of the approximately 700 U.S. insurance company insolvencies from 1969 to 1999 and possibly a contributing factor in 53%.

From 2005 to 2021, annual insured natural catastrophe losses continued to rise in inflation-adjusted terms with average annual losses increasing by 700% in constant 2021 dollars from 1985 to 2021. In 2005, Ceres released a white paper that found that catastrophic weather-related insurance losses in the United States rose 10 times faster than premiums in inflation-adjusted terms from 1971 to 2004, and projected that climate change would likely cause higher premiums and deductibles and impact the affordability and availability of property insurance, crop insurance, health insurance, life insurance, business interruption insurance, and liability insurance in the United States. From 2013 to 2023, U.S. insurance companies paid $655.7 billion in natural disaster claims with the $295.8 billion paid from 2020 to 2022 setting a record for a three-year period, and after only the Philippines, the United States lost the largest share of its gross domestic product in 2022 of any country due to natural disasters while having the greatest annual economic loss in absolute terms.

In September 2024, Verisk Analytics released an annually issued report that noted that while interannual changes in global insured natural catastrophe losses owes mostly to increased exposure (i.e. growth in the number of insurance policies sold), inflation, and climate variability rather than climate change, the report also summarized company projections that estimated that climate change increases the global average annual insured loss 1% year-over-year (in comparison to 7% that year for exposure growth and inflation), and that the impact of climate change on interannual changes could become comparable to that of climate variability by 2050 due to the former following a compound growth rate. In January 2025, the Federal Insurance Office of the U.S. Treasury Department issued a report that showed that the average home insurance policy premium in the United States rose 8.7% faster than the inflation rate from 2018 through 2022, while the average premium in the top quintile of ZIP Codes for expected annual losses to structures from climate-related perils rose 14.7% faster and the bottom quintile of ZIP Codes fell by 1.4% relative to the inflation rate.

== Industry regulation ==
In December 2005, the National Association of Insurance Commissioners (NAIC) formed a Climate Change and Global Warming Task Force that issued a white paper in 2008 on potential insurance-related impacts of climate change to policyholders, insurers, and insurance regulators. In August 2021, the Federal Insurance Office (FIO) of the U.S. Treasury Department issued a request for information for climate-related financial risks to the U.S. insurance industry pursuant to Executive Order 14030. In February 2022, the FIO announced that it had joined the Network for Greening the Financial System. In April 2022, the NAIC announced that it would adopt a climate risk disclosure standard aligned with the recommendations of the Task Force on Climate-related Financial Disclosures. In October 2022, the FIO issued a request for comment on a proposed home and property insurance data collection aggregated at the ZIP Code level to assess climate-related impacts on insurability pursuant to Executive Order 14030.

While the insurance sector in the United States collects data on weather-related losses to inform policy pricing, insurance companies typically do not publicly disclose any detailed data on how climate risk is factored into the pricing for individual properties. In May 2023, the National Oceanic and Atmospheric Administration and the National Science Foundation announced the formation of an industry-university cooperative research center to provide the insurance industry with climate change data to improve modelling for catastrophic impacts in risk assessments of future weather conditions. In June 2023, the FIO released a report pursuant to Executive Order 14030 that found that climate risk oversight was becoming increasingly critical for state insurance regulators, and along with the NAIC, state regulators were incorporating climate risk into supervision and regulation but that most efforts remained preliminary. In November 2023, the FIO submitted the data collection request to the Office of Management and Budget for review and clearance under the Paperwork Reduction Act.

In February 2024, the Treasury Department hosted a roundtable discussion with climate and consumer organizations on climate risks and insurance markets. In March 2024, the NAIC sent letters to 400 home insurance companies requesting detailed data on policy pricing and structuring to investigate affordability and availability issues of home insurance in collaboration with the FIO. In January 2025, the FIO released a report on its data collection that found that home insurance premiums across 246 million policies provided by 330 insurers from 2018 to 2022 were 82% higher in the top quintile of ZIP Codes by expected annual losses to structures from climate-related perils than in the ZIP Codes within the bottom quintile, that nonrenewal rates were approximately 80% higher in the top quintile ZIP Codes than in the bottom quintile, and that the ratio of claims losses to premium revenue was 18% higher in the top quintile ZIP Codes than the bottom quintile ZIP Codes despite higher premiums per policy being charged.

=== Criticism of industry ===
The insurance industry has been criticized by environmental activists and Democratic Party lawmakers for continuing to provide coverage to fossil fuel companies, while Republican Party lawmakers have criticized the industry for curbing policy coverage to oil-and-gas companies (even though most U.S. insurance companies have generally refrained from doing so in contrast to insurers internationally) and for incorporating environmental, social, and corporate governance metrics into oil-and-gas company insurance policy premiums. In March 2021, U.S. Senators Elizabeth Warren, Jeff Merkley, Sheldon Whitehouse, and Chris Van Hollen sent joint letters to the American International Group (AIG), Berkshire Hathaway, Chubb Limited, Liberty Mutual, MetLife, Travelers Insurance, and other U.S. insurance companies requesting information about how each company's continued fossil fuel underwriting aligns with its stated sustainability commitments in light of the withdrawal of underwriting by more than 25 major international competitors, as well as any climate change scenarios the companies have performed on physical risks to annual premium revenue and claims expenditures and any stress tests for transition risks the companies have performed due to their fossil fuel underwriting exposure.

In June 2023, the Senate Budget Committee opened an investigation that sent letters to State Farm, Liberty Mutual, Berkshire Hathaway, AIG, Travelers Insurance, Chubb Limited, and Starr Companies requesting company documents about company underwriting and investment in fossil fuel companies and company policies with respect to Paris Agreement greenhouse gas emission reduction commitments. In March 2023, Chubb Limited announced that its insurance policies for oil-and-gas companies would require greater reductions in methane emissions for coverage, and in May 2024, Chubb Limited CEO Evan G. Greenberg criticized state governments for blocking insurers from pricing climate risk into policies, stating "Climate change is sending price signals. Society will not adjust its behavior to the change of climate just because people talk about it." By October 2021, Chubb Limited had dropped its policy coverage for the Trans Mountain pipeline, ended investments in companies that generated more than 30% of revenue from coal mining or coal-based energy production and stopped underwriting the construction and operation of new coal power plants for such companies, and was scheduled to phase out coverage to companies with existing plants above the 30% revenue threshold by 2022.

However, Chubb Limited was estimated to have received $500 million to $800 million in annual premium revenue from the fossil fuel industry in June 2023, and the Senate Budget Committee letter stated that a Chubb Limited subsidiary was linked to petroleum exploration in the Arctic by BP. In March 2022, AIG announced a carbon neutrality pledge aligned with the Paris Agreement and that it would cease underwriting coverage of new coal power plants, oil sands mining, and Arctic exploration. Nonetheless, the June 2023 Senate Budget Committee letter to AIG noted that the company received $675 million in premium revenue from the fossil fuel industry in 2021, had not restricted underwriting to any new conventional oil or natural gas development, and continued to provide coverage for the Trans Mountain pipeline. In its letters to Berkshire Hathaway and State Farm, the Senate Budget Committee noted that State Farm held more investments in oil and natural gas projects than any U.S. insurance company with at least $30.9 billion in fossil fuel investments, while Berkshire Hathaway was the largest shareholder of Chevron Corporation, Berkshire Hathaway Energy owned or had stakes in 24 coal power plants, and CEO Warren Buffett has stated publicly that climate change should not factor into the company's investment decisions.

In response to criticism about continued underwriting of fossil fuel companies, AIG and Chubb Limited argued in 2021 and 2023 respectively that complete withdrawal of coverage to fossil fuel companies would risk national energy security and that renewable energy was not yet meeting national energy demand. In February 2024, the Energy Information Administration (EIA) estimated that solar power in the United States only accounted for 4% of U.S. electricity generation in 2023 while natural gas accounted for 43%, but the EIA projected that solar power would account for 58% of new electricity generation in 2024. While criticized by OPEC and Republican Party lawmakers, the International Energy Agency (IEA) projected in October 2023 that global demand for oil, natural gas, and coal would peak before 2030. The IEA projected in December 2022 that renewable energy would overtake coal as the largest source of electricity generation globally by 2025, while the IEA projected in January 2024 that record electricity generation from renewable and nuclear power globally would absorb rising global power demand over the next 3 years from emerging markets, artificial intelligence, cryptocurrencies and blockchain technology, and data centers.

In May 2023, the IEA projected that annual global investments in solar power would overtake investments in oil for the first time, and the IEA projected in June 2023 that global oil demand would peak by 2028. In June 2024, the IEA projected that global investments in renewable and nuclear power along with related infrastructure would exceed $2 trillion for the year and would be double that of investments in fossil fuels, and the IEA reiterated its projections that global oil demand would peak before 2030. In August 2024, BloombergNEF estimated that low-carbon electricity sources comprised more than 40% of global electricity production for the first time in 2023. In February 2023, the IEA estimated that the global oil-and-gas industry could cut 75% of its methane emissions if it invested 3% of net income (or approximately $100 billion) by 2030 on already existing technologies, while the IEA estimated in June 2023 that the industry could cut 15% of its total industry greenhouse gas emissions if it invested 2% of net income (or approximately $75 billion) on technologies to reduce emissions by 2030.

In March 2023, the Senate Budget Committee held a series of hearings on the economic impacts of climate change that included testimony from insurance company executives and actuaries. In September 2023, the Senate Banking Committee held a hearing on contemporary issues in property insurance markets where representatives from the Consumer Federation of America, National Church Residences, and the R Street Institute provided testimony of the impacts of climate change on the property insurance industry, the impacts on low-income property insurance policyholders, and California Proposition 103. While the California Department of Insurance announced in September 2023 that it would permit property insurers to factor future climate risks into premiums on the condition that insurers write more policies in areas with greater risk, California was the only state that did not permit the use of catastrophe modeling by insurance companies to set premiums as of April 2024. In November 2023, the Senate Budget Committee opened a related investigation that sent letters to more than 40 insurance companies requesting company documents about regions in the country where the companies were either considering or have withdrawn coverage. In December 2023, House Democratic Caucus and Senate Democratic Caucus members on the Congressional Joint Economic Committee released an issue brief on climate risk and insurance markets.

In June 2024, the Senate Budget Committee held a hearing on climate change and property insurance premium increases. In September 2024, The Wall Street Journal published an analysis of NAIC data on 236 property and casualty insurance companies that showed that while the median ratio of company portfolios for holdings of fossil fuel company securities fell from 3.4% in 2014 to 1.8% in 2023, the mean ratio in the sector rose from 3.8% to 4.4%. While the majority of the companies surveyed had cut their fossil fuel company security holdings or eliminated them altogether, more than 90% of the increase across the sector was attributable solely to investments by State Farm and Berkshire Hathaway and 85% of the increase to Berkshire Hathaway's investment in Occidental Petroleum. In the same month, OPEC's 2024 fourth quarter estimates for global oil demand was 1.1 million barrels per day higher than the IEA's, and excepting estimates from 2020 to 2022 during the COVID-19 lockdowns, the gap in the global quarterly projections between the organizations topped 350,000 barrels per day for the first time since 2010, while most projections by independent market forecasters, including S&P Global Commodity Insights, aligned with the IEA estimates. In October 2024, the IEA projected that renewable energy would account for nearly half of global electricity generation by 2030 and 40% of global energy demand by 2035.

== Reinsurance ==
In 2015, the market for catastrophe bonds was estimated to have grown to $25.66 billion, with issuance up by 27% over the previous year after steady growth over the previous three years from approximately $15 billion in 2012, and the size of the market was expected to double over the next several years due to their increased issuance by insurance companies and other entities seeking insurance as an alternative to reinsurance. Catastrophe bonds were created in the wake of the insurance losses caused by Hurricane Andrew in 1992 that caused bankruptcies of multiple insurance companies, and are high-yield corporate bonds with an average maturity of 3 years and floating interest rates. In September 2015, reinsurance premiums were expected to fall by 5% the following January after falling by greater percentages the previous January and July due to the growth of the catastrophe bond market being driven by the general low-yield market after the 2008 financial crisis. In July 2015, Berkshire Hathaway was reexamining its reinsurance business in light of the growing catastrophe bonds market, and in 2016, reinsurance premiums fell to their lowest level since 2001 due to the increased growth in the catastrophe bonds market.

Despite an estimated $135.6 billion in insurance losses due to claims related to extreme weather events in 2017, reinsurance premiums saw only a 6% increase due to substantial capital inflows into the catastrophe bond and insurance-linked securities markets that enabled insurance companies to access the financial capital to cover the losses and resist the reinsurance premium increases. Diminished returns for the reinsurance industry continued through 2018 despite multiple extreme weather events causing $79 billion in insurance claims, but reinsurance premiums saw increases in 2019 after the catastrophe bond and alternative capital markets saw a $5 billion capital outflow to $93 billion in 2019 from a peak at $98 billion in 2018 due to two years of negative returns. Despite the fact that insurance losses from the 2019 storm season were estimated below the 10-year average, reinsurance premiums saw upward momentum in 2020 due to increased risk and uncertainty from active storm seasons to insurance policy pricing. Reinsurance premiums to property insurers covering wildfire risk in California were expected to rise by 30% to 70% for 2020 in comparison to a global price increase of 10%. While catastrophe bonds saw record issuance in 2021, issuance during the first half of 2022 was 9% lower than it was during the first half of 2021 due to rising interest rates.

Coupled with $120 billion in insurance losses on claims related to extreme weather events in 2022, higher interest rates on catastrophe bonds caused the first year-over-year decline in dedicated reinsurance capital since 2008 and led to an estimated 37% increase in reinsurance premiums for 2023. After a more than 2% negative return in 2022, the ratio of the average coupon to the average expected loss on catastrophe bonds rose to a factor of 5 (its highest level since 2002) as investors demanded significantly higher yields relative to the risk on the bonds. Despite the risk, the catastrophe bond market grew to a record $41.75 billion in 2023 (or double its size in 2013) with a record $11 billion in sales. In July 2023, reinsurance premiums for property insurance companies in the United States were estimated to have increased by 50% in general for July 1 policy renewals, while policies that faced previous natural catastrophe claims rose by 30% to 50%. In January 2024, reinsurance premiums for property insurers increased by 5% for January 1 policy renewals. During the first and second quarters of 2024, catastrophe bonds saw record issuance (valued at $11.4 billion) that drove dedicated reinsurance capital back up to 2021 levels, while preliminary estimates for property catastrophe reinsurance pricing for 2024 was flat in year-over-year terms and reinsurance premiums for property insurance companies fell by 5% for June 1 policy renewals.

== Property insurance ==
In May 2022, climate risk research showed that nearly 80 million U.S. residential or commercial properties representing $8.8 trillion in property value would face increased wildfire risk over the subsequent 30 years (including one-fifth of single-family homes). During the first half of 2023, there were 12 potential billion-dollar weather disasters in the United States, which tied with 2017 for the record number during the first and second quarters after the country averaged 8 annually from 1980 to 2022. In April 2017, property insurance companies saw their worst first quarter in 20 years due to 425 tornados in the United States and other severe storms causing $6 billion to $7 billion in losses. Widespread thunderstorms in the United States during the first half of 2023 accounted for 70% of global natural catastrophe insurance losses and topped more than $50 billion for the first time on record. By the end of the year, insured losses from thunderstorm damage topped $55 billion and also exceeded insured losses from hurricane damage for the first time on record.

=== Residential property ===
From 2017 to 2020, the national average home insurance premium in the United States rose by 11.4% while inflation rose by only 7.9% after extreme weather events and secondary catastrophes (which include wildfires, thunderstorms, droughts, flash floods, and landslides) caused $370 billion in inflation-adjusted claims, and the increasing frequency, destructiveness, and cost of secondary catastrophes are requiring insurance companies to incorporate models for them into their policy risk assessments. From 2017 to 2021, home insurance claims from property damage due to wind and hail, water damage and freezing, or fire and lightning accounted for 88% to 92% of all causes of loss, while theft of contents, liability, and all other property damage (including vandalism and malicious mischief) ranged from 8% to 12%. After 20 billion-dollar weather disasters in 2021 caused $145 billion in economic losses (including $75 billion from Hurricane Ida) and 1 in 10 U.S. homes saw property damage from a natural disaster, 90% of U.S. home insurance policyholders were estimated to have seen premium increases from May 2021 to May 2022 with an average increase of 12%, while the United States Consumer Price Index (CPI) rose by 8.6%, the house price index (HPI) of the Federal Housing Finance Agency rose by 18.3%, and final demand construction prices in the U.S. Producer Price Index (PPI) rose by 19%.

From June 2022 to June 2023, the national average home insurance premium increased by 20% to $1,428 per year as 31 states approved double-digit percentage premium increases while the CPI rose by 3%, the HPI rose by 3%, and PPI final demand construction prices rose by 10.3%. and insurers also restricted coverage as wind and hail storms, and the June 2023 tornado outbreak caused billions of dollars in insurance losses during the first and second quarters. From 2013 through 2023, insurance companies saw net income losses on home insurance coverage as they paid out more in claims nationally than they received in premiums, and after only seeing net income losses in 8 states in 2013 and 12 states in 2018, insurance companies saw net income losses on home insurance coverage in 18 states in 2023 (including the East South Central and West North Central states that border the Mississippi and the Ohio Rivers and all of the East North Central states). Net income losses on home insurance underwriting to the industry nationally grew from $6.4 billion in 2017 to the largest annual net income loss since 2000 at $15.9 billion in 2023.

From January 2023 through May 2024, 45 states saw double-digit percentage increases in home insurance premiums which were largely being driven up by rising reinsurance premiums for home insurers (which in turn was being driven by the reinsurance industry's declining profitability from 2014 to 2022 from increased natural disaster claims), and by January 2024, earnings guidance issued by publicly traded insurers began projecting at least short-term profitability. Insurance industry estimates in April 2024 projected a 6% increase in the average national home insurance premium for the year and increases more than 10% in at least 8 states. While most mortgage lenders in the United States typically require a borrower to have a home insurance policy because few households can withstand the financial loss of an uninsured home, approximately 12% of U.S. homeowners in 2023 were foregoing home insurance coverage and approximately half of those doing so had household incomes below $40,000. In August 2023, the number of new home insurance policies in the United States with $2,000 to $2,500 deductibles tripled since 2019 while the number of policies with $500 deductibles fell by two-thirds.

After Hurricane Katrina in 2005, home insurance policies in hurricane-prone areas typically began including "hurricane deductibles"—a special type of deductible that requires policyholders to pay a percentage of the property value rather than a flat amount that have been criticized by consumer advocates for shifting repair costs from insurers to policyholders. Similar "tornado deductibles" have also become common in tornado-prone states, and there were 17 billion dollar tornado events in the United States from 2018 to 2023 and 9 of the 10 costliest hurricanes in U.S. history in inflation-adjusted terms occurred from 2005 to 2022. From the first quarter of 2019 to 2020, policy renewal premiums for multifamily residential properties increased by 33% as compared to 23% for the real estate sector broadly while PPI final demand construction prices rose by 1.7% from March 2019 to March 2020. From 2020 to 2022, property insurance premiums on affordable housing rental properties receiving Low-Income Housing Tax Credits were estimated to have increased from $386.90 per year in 2020 to $590.30 per year in 2022 (or an approximately 53% increase) and were expected to increase further in 2023 due to weather-related damage and rising inflation.

A 2024 survey of 1,800 condominium associations across 44 states found that association dues rose by 20% over the preceding 2 years, while a 2023 survey of community associations found that 91% saw insurance premium increases at the previous renewal date and the majority paid for the premium increase by raising annual dues or levying special assessments. While real estate industry analysis in July 2024 estimated insurance costs for property investors to only be 8% of total costs, rising insurance costs reduced values on multifamily properties nationally by 3.6% from the fourth quarter of 2019 through the second quarter of 2024, contributed to 17% of total expense growth during the period, and was the only component of total expenses that saw its annual growth rate to continue to increase in 2024. After 28 billion dollar weather disasters in the United States in total in 2023 caused $80 billion in insured natural catastrophe losses, home insurance premiums had risen by 23% over the previous year in May 2024 while the CPI saw a 3.3% year-over-year increase, National Association of Realtors preliminary home prices data for the month showed a 5.8% year-over-year increase, and PPI final demand construction prices fell by 0.9%. In October 2024, Zillow announced that it would join Redfin and Realtor.com in including climate risk data computed by the First Street Foundation for all properties listed on the site.

Real estate industry estimates released in June 2022 showed that 33 million homes with $10.5 trillion of reconstruction cost value along the Gulf and Atlantic Coasts were at risk of hurricane-force wind damage. In 2018, insurance companies rejected renewals for 8,751 home insurance policies in ZIP Codes affected by the 2015 and 2017 California wildfires (a 9.6% increase from the previous year). In November 2018, the California Department of Insurance launched a review of the financial stability of property insurance companies in the state after claims filed to the Merced Property & Casualty Company following the Camp Fire that month pushed the firm to the point of insolvency. In 2018, the 5-year moving average of total burned acres in California surpassed 1 million and rose to 2.2 million in 2021. In 2019, a survey of California Association of Realtors members found that 27% had issues with fire insurance either personally or with a client, and among the members with fire insurance issues, 34% stated that they had potential buyers backing out of sales due to difficulties of obtaining a fire insurance policy.

In 2019, insurers declined to renew 235,000 home insurance policies in California statewide in a 31% increase in the statewide non-renewal rate from the previous year, with non-renewal rates in ZIP Codes with moderate to high wildfire risk increasing by 61% and in the top 10 counties for wildfire risk by 203%. Over the preceding 4 years, California home insurers rejected renewals for 350,000 policies and tens of thousands of home insurance policies in Florida saw renewal rejections during the same time period due to increased risk of hurricane-related property damage. In December 2019, the California Department of Insurance announced a one-year moratorium on home insurance non-renewals affecting approximately 800,000 policies in areas at high-risk for wildfire property damage. In October 2021, Chubb Limited announced that it would reduce its home insurance policy coverage in areas of California exposed to moderate to high risk of wildfires, and the AIG rejected renewals for 9,000 California home insurance policyholders on multi-million dollar homes in January 2022 (after the California Department of Insurance approved an average 17.5% premium rate increase for AIG's home insurance policies in the state in 2020).

From mid-2020 to mid-2024, home insurance premiums for $1.5 million mortgage loans through Citizens Financial Group rose by 130% while premiums for $400,000 to $800,000 loans rose by 12%. In May 2023, State Farm announced that it was halting all new-home insurance policy sales in California due to increased wildfire risk and rising inflation, while Allstate announced that it would it also halt all new-home insurance policy sales in California due to increased wildfire risk the following month. From 2018 to 2023, the state-operated home insurers of last resort in California, Florida, and Louisiana saw their total number of policyholders double, with the Florida insurer of last resort, Citizens Property Insurance Corporation, increasing to 1.4 million policyholders and became the largest home insurer in the state. In November 2023, the Senate Budget Committee opened an investigation into Citizens due to concerns about a potential federal bailout being required in the event of an extremely destructive hurricane after Florida Governor Ron DeSantis made comments suggesting that the company was insolvent, and the Senate Budget Committee renewed its requests for documents and information from Citizens in March 2024.

In 2021, Florida had the highest average home insurance premium of any state in the country at $2,380 per year and saw a 21% increase from 2018 (in comparison to an only 4% increase in the average home insurance premium nationally to $1,297 per year), driven in part by $30 billion in claims for damage caused by Hurricane Irma and Hurricane Michael and rising reinsurance premiums. Following the 2004 and 2005 Atlantic hurricane seasons, many national home insurance companies completely withdrew coverage from Florida and this has led to dominance of the state's home insurance market by smaller companies that typically provide coverage only in-state and are more dependent on reinsurance. While research published by Land Economics in 2018 found that the 2002 Florida building code reduced windstorm insurances losses in the state by 72% between 2001 and 2010 with a 6-to-1 ratio in reduced insurance losses to increased construction costs, construction industry estimates have found that compliance with the newer codes increased home prices by as much as 45% in certain parts of Florida by the time of Hurricane Irma.

In 2022, the average home insurance premium in Florida remained the highest statewide average and had risen to $4,231 per year (or triple the national average). Despite the passage of bills by the Florida Legislature to address the property insurance crisis in the state—which included a provision to repeal a state law that required insurers in home insurance lawsuits decided in their favor to cover plaintiff attorney's fees (as 80% of home insurance lawsuits in the United States were filed by Florida plaintiffs in contrast to only 10% of home insurance claims in the United States being filed by Florida policyholders)—that were signed into law by Governor DeSantis in December 2022, the average home insurance premium in Florida rose by 42% in 2023 to $6,000 per year (and to triple the statewide average in 2019 at $1,988 per year) and remained the highest statewide average in the United States. In a 2023 national homebuilders survey, 32% of Florida homebuilders, 29% of Southern California homebuilders, and 20% of Northern California homebuilders stated that rising home insurance premiums were "somewhat slowing sales" as compared with 9% nationally. Research on policy renewal rejections in California has shown that non-renewals can cause a 12% reduction in home property values.

Coupled with migration out of the San Francisco Bay Area during the COVID-19 pandemic in the state, the rising home insurance premiums from the increased wildfire risk is exacerbating pre-COVID housing affordability issues in California (especially in the Sierra Nevada region) that have seen thousands of California residents relocate to states such as Nevada, Idaho, Utah, and Arizona. During the COVID-19 pandemic in Florida, housing affordability issues exacerbated by the rising home and property insurance premiums led to the state's slowest population growth rate since 2014 and its lowest in-migration from other states since 2011, and the state has also seen out-migration from high property value ZIP Codes (such as Flamingo Park in West Palm Beach) in the years since. From July 2021 to February 2023, 12 home insurance companies with policy coverage in Louisiana were declared insolvent, 50 other companies stopped writing policies in hurricane-prone parishes, the number of policyholders covered by the state insurer of last resort rose from 35,000 to 132,000, and 4 of the 10 counties in the United States with the largest population declines from 2021 to 2022 were in Louisiana (led by St. John the Baptist Parish). In 2021, California saw 241,000 home insurance policy renewal rejections, and Louisiana saw the average home insurance premium rise by 27% from May 2022 to May 2023.

In June 2023, AIG announced that it was planning to reduce home insurance policy coverage across 200 ZIP Codes in Florida, New York, Delaware, Colorado, Montana, Idaho, and Wyoming, and Farmers Insurance Group announced that it was halting new-home insurance policy sales in Florida earlier in the year. In July 2023, the home insurance division of the American Automobile Association announced that it would not renew certain higher exposure policies in Florida, while Farmers Insurance announced that it was ending sales of home insurance policies under its own brand in Florida and would limit sales of its home insurance brand products to 7,000 policies per month in California. From May 2021 to May 2023, home insurance premiums in Massachusetts increased by 26% and insurers are expected to start increasing premiums or rejecting renewals in the state due to the increasing frequency and destructiveness of secondary catastrophes. In 2023, Farmers Insurance increased premiums by more than 23% for tens of thousands of home insurance policies in Illinois and Texas, while Nationwide Mutual rejected 10,525 policy renewals in North Carolina.

After seeing home prices double between 2017 and 2024 and having the fastest growing population of any state for most of the period from 2021 through 2023, Florida home prices were mostly flat from March 2023 to October 2024 while home insurance premiums had risen by as much as 400% in some regions of the state from 2019 to 2024. While real estate industry data showed the Tampa Bay area to be the fifth most popular relocation destination in 2023, the region saw a 58% increase in the housing supply of single-family home and condominiums and a 10% decrease in housing demand from August 2023 to August 2024 and about half of the homes in the region saw price reductions through September 2024–the third highest ratio for major metropolitan areas in the country. The Greater Orlando and Space Coast regions also saw more than 50% increases in the housing supply and 16% decreases in housing demand from August 2023 to August 2024, while the Lakeland, Sarasota, Miami, Cape Coral, Deltona, and Jacksonville metropolitan areas saw 33% to 50% increases in housing supply and more than 10% decreases in housing demand.

=== Commercial property ===
During the first three quarters of 2019, business insurance premiums in the United States rose by 6.7% due to losses from hurricanes, wildfires, and other catastrophes and was on pace for its highest annual increase since 2003. In 2022, premiums in Florida for commercial property insurance had doubled over the preceding year, premiums for builder's risk insurance had increased by 30% over the previous 2 years, premiums for liability insurance for constructing condominiums quadrupled over the previous 2 years, and property insurance premiums were expected to increase further due to reinsurance companies requiring premium increases in part to cover increased hurricane-related property damage risks (leading many property developers to put construction projects on hold). In August 2022, FM Global announced a resilience credit to 1,500 business insurance policies that would reduce annual premiums by 5% if the policyholder adapted property covered under the policy from various climate hazards including hurricanes, wildfires, and flooding. In August 2023, insurance premiums for commercial real estate in the United States saw an average annual increase of 7% since 2017. In a June 2024 survey of 800 small business chief executive officers jointly conducted by The Wall Street Journal and Vistage Worldwide, nearly three-quarters of respondents stated that they saw increases in their property and casualty insurance costs for that year with more than 30% of respondents stating that the costs had risen by more than 10%.

=== Flood insurance ===
From 1980 to 2005, weather-related claims to the National Flood Insurance Program (NFIP) cost $34.1 billion in constant 2005 dollars, which represented 11% of all weather-related insurance losses in the United States during the period and the NFIP's exposure to weather-related losses quadrupled to $1 trillion in 2005. Despite the rising frequency and cost of flooding, the NFIP lost nearly 1 million policyholders from 2009 to 2023, while the Federal Emergency Management Agency (FEMA) spent $4 billion from 1989 to 2024 financing 45,000 to 50,000 floodplain buyouts. A 2020 NAIC report showed that the number of private insurers in the United States writing flood insurance policies grew from 50 companies in 2016 to 140 companies in 2019 and $390 million in direct premiums written in 2017 to $523 million in 2019, while S&P Global Market Intelligence estimated in 2023 that the number of private insurers writing flood policies grew from 18 companies in 2016 underwriting 12.6% of the market with $410 million in direct premiums written to 77 companies in 2022 underwriting 32.1% of the market with $1.31 billion in direct premiums written.

However, research published in the American Economic Journal in August 2022 found that fewer than 60% of homeowners with houses in high-risk flood zones where coverage is mandatory have a flood policy. Also, as of August 2024, 14 states have no statutory or regulatory flood risk disclosure requirement for real estate companies to prospective buyers, while 27 states only require disclosure of whether a property is in a FEMA-designated flood zone or has had past flood damage to its structures and not whether flood insurance is mandatory for the property or the cost of flood insurance for the property. Research published in July 2014 showed that 6.5 million homes in the United States along the Atlantic and Gulf Coasts were at increased risk of flood damage from hurricane-related storm surge, while climate risk data in June 2024 showed that in 33 ZIP Codes along the Atlantic and Gulf Coasts with median home values of at least $1 million there were more than 77,000 properties at significant flood risk with potential losses estimated at $100 billion. Following criticism of the NFIP for insuring repetitive loss properties the previous year, FEMA announced in April 2018 that it would issue its first catastrophe bond the following July to transfer some of the risk exposure of the NFIP to private capital markets. Despite having $16 billion of its debt cancelled in 2017, the NFIP remained more than $20 billion in debt in 2023.

In October 2021, the NFIP instituted an overhaul to its pricing system to more accurately price flood risks not previously identified by FEMA flood maps by including distance from waterbodies, building first-floor heights, and rebuilding costs in risk assessments, and FEMA initially estimated the pricing system overhaul would result in premium increases for 77% of policyholders. In May 2022, FEMA announced a proposal to overhaul the NFIP by dropping coverage for repetitive loss properties and to deny coverage to homes in flood-prone areas after one-sixth of the total dollar value in claims paid by the program over the preceding 30 years were to repetitive loss properties and such properties received $35.1 billion in claims in the program's history through the previous December (which was nearly half of the total dollar value the program had paid in claims in its history). As of September 2023, 10 states had filed lawsuits against FEMA (as the NFIP was scheduled to expire at the beginning of the following month) for the NFIP pricing system overhaul as it was estimated that two-thirds of the program's policyholders would see premium increases, that premiums would double in 12 coastal and landlocked states, and cause homeowners living in flood zones to lose their homes by losing insurance coverage required by the terms of their mortgages.

Research published in 2015 found the Tampa Bay area to be the most vulnerable region in the United States to storm surge flooding by a 100-year hurricane (with the potential financial losses for flood damage from such a storm to residential, commercial, and industrial property in the region estimated at $175 billion). As Hurricane Milton approached the Tampa Bay area in October 2024, financial industry estimates reiterated upper potential losses at $175 billion in property damage to the Tampa Bay area from a 100-year storm. From 2010 to 2017, the population of Tampa, Florida grew by 12% and 50% of the Tampa population lived in housing less than 10 feet above sea level in 2015, while approximately three-quarters of the population of Florida as a whole in the 2020 United States census lived in the state's 35 coastal counties (where the resident population increased by 6 million between 1990 and 2020) and 8 of the state's coastal counties were among the top 20 coastal counties in the United States with the fastest growing populations. Despite Miami being ranked by the OECD as one of the top 10 cities globally to be most vulnerable to flooding from sea level rise, construction volume in the Miami metropolitan area has been estimated to have grown in inflation-adjusted terms from $15.8 billion in 2014 to $27.4 billion in 2023 and the region's population grew by more than 660,000 between 2010 and 2020.

While FEMA flood maps showed 8 million properties to be in high-risk flood zones where the estimated flood risk is 26% over the course of a 30-year mortgage, climate risk research in September 2024 estimated that 18 million properties are at the level of risk of a FEMA high-risk flood zone because more than one-fifth of FEMA flood maps for individual communities are more than a decade old and do not account for the risk of heavy rainfall. In October 2024, The Wall Street Journal published an analysis commissioned from the First Street Foundation that showed that 290,000 properties constructed in the United States from 2019 through 2023 (or nearly one-fifth of the 1.6 million properties built during the period) were constructed in areas at the level of flood risk of a FEMA-designated flood zone, but that 211,000 of those properties were constructed in areas outside of the official flood zones. Despite one-third of NFIP claims from 2013 to 2023 being filed on properties outside of high-risk flood zones, 37 states saw the number of NFIP policies held decline from July 2023 to July 2024 with only New England, New York, Michigan, Florida, Arizona, New Mexico, Alaska, Hawaii, and the District of Columbia seeing increases.

=== Vehicle insurance ===
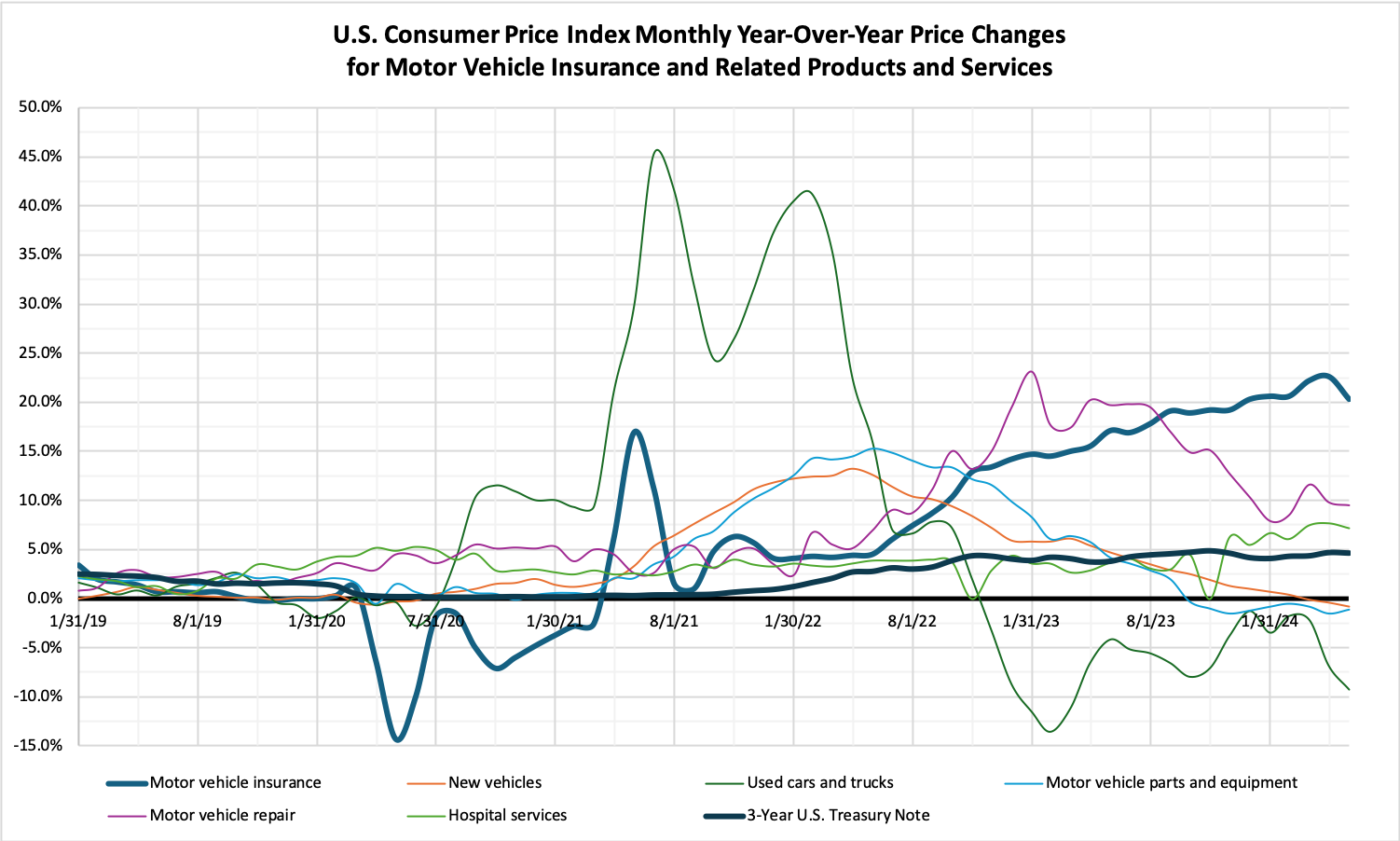
Monthly year-over-year price changes in vehicle insurance, new vehicles, used vehicles, vehicle parts and equipment, vehicle repair, and hospital services in the United States Consumer Price Index and the interest rates on 3-year U.S. Treasury Notes from January 2019 to May 2024. Note: Catastrophe bonds issued by insurance companies have an average maturity of 3 years and are used as a substitute for reinsurance.

From November 2022 through November 2023, vehicle insurance premiums in the United States increased by 19.2% and more than six times the 3.1% year-over-year increase in the CPI during the same period, while vehicle repair prices and new vehicle prices rose by 12.7% and 1.3% respectively, and used vehicle prices and vehicle parts and equipment prices fell by 3.8% and by 1.1% respectively. The year-over-year increases in vehicle insurance premiums from November 2022 to November 2023 were part of a sequence of double-digit percentage increases in vehicle insurance premiums for 15 consecutive months for the first time since the mid-1980s partly due to extreme weather events damaging greater numbers of vehicles. From 2013 to 2023, the national average vehicle insurance premium rose by 70% with states with higher frequencies of natural catastrophes seeing steeper premium increases—such as Colorado and Florida, which saw 52% and 88% increases respectively.

Also, while there was an increase in liability and collision coverage claims in the 4 years after the COVID-19 lockdowns, the claims frequency on private passenger auto policies from 2013 to 2022 for liability and collision coverage generally declined while comprehensive coverage claims frequency (which includes claims for weather-related damage) generally increased. From January 1996 to September 2000, vehicle insurance losses from natural disaster claims amounted to $3.4 billion on 1.7 million claims and averaged 10% of total annual disaster-related property insurance losses, while the National Highway Traffic Safety Administration estimated in 1999 that 16% of vehicle collisions were attributable to adverse weather conditions. While there were more than 770,000 motor vehicles thefts in 2017, more than 1 million cars were either damaged or destroyed by Hurricane Harvey and Hurricane Irma in the same year. In March 2024, vehicle insurance premiums had increased by 22.2% over the preceding year, while the CPI rose over the previous year by 3.5%, vehicle repair prices rose by 11.6%, and prices on new vehicles, used vehicles, and vehicle parts and equipment fell by 0.1%, 2.2%, and 0.8% respectively.

The next month, vehicle insurance premiums had increased by 22.6% over the preceding year in the highest annual increase since 1979, while the CPI rose over the previous year by 3.4%, vehicle repair prices rose by 9.8%, and prices on new vehicles, used vehicles, and vehicle parts and equipment fell by 0.4%, 6.9%, and 1.5% respectively. In the same month, vehicle insurance premiums had increased by 20.3% over the preceding year, while vehicle repair prices rose by 9.5%, and prices on new vehicles, used vehicles, and vehicle parts and equipment fell by 0.8%, 9.3%, and 1.1% respectively. In June 2024, vehicle insurance premiums increased by 19.5% over the preceding year, while vehicle repair prices rose by 6.7%, and prices on new vehicles, used vehicles, and vehicle parts and equipment fell by 1.6%, 10.1%, and 1% respectively. While not expected to impact premiums nationally, auto insurance losses from Hurricane Helene and Hurricane Milton in 2024 were expected to account for 10% of overall insurance losses from the storms and to possibly result in premium increases in impacted regions and other hurricane-prone states.

== Other insurance lines ==
While home insurance, property insurance, and reinsurance premiums and catastrophe bond interest rates in the United States are increasing, research in extreme event attribution has estimated that of the $143 billion in annual average global economic losses from 2000 to 2019 due to claims related to extreme weather events caused by climate change, only 37% was attributable to property damage and 63% was attributable to the lost value of statistical lives from event fatalities. Due to rising hospitalizations from the effects of climate change on human health (like heat stress and cardiorespiratory fitness impacts from wildfire smoke), health insurance companies in the United States are beginning to develop models for their policies related to climate risk. Healthcare policy analysis published in June 2023 estimated that 65 million workers in the United States between the ages of 19 and 64 (or more than two-fifths of the U.S. labor force) are in occupations at increased risk for climate-related medical problems with non-white Americans and Americans with lower levels of educational attainment statistically overrepresented in such occupations and 16% of such workers lacking health insurance coverage (in comparison to 7% of workers not in such occupations).

Parametric insurance coverage has increasingly been offered to businesses and local governments in the United States to cover losses from property damage, lost productivity, and workplace injuries related to the rising frequency, intensity, and duration of heat waves. From 1980 to 2005, weather-related claims to the Federal Crop Insurance Corporation (FCIC) cost $43.6 billion in constant 2005 dollars, which represented 14% of all weather-related insurance losses in the United States during the period while the FCIC's exposure to weather-related losses grew 26-fold. In July 2021, research published in Environmental Research Letters estimated that county-level temperature increases from 1991 to 2017 accounted for 19% of crop insurance losses (amounting to $27 billion) on FCIC policies and approximately half of the losses in 2012 (the costliest year surveyed) during the 2012–2013 North American drought.

== See also ==
- Climate change in the United States
- Climate change adaptation
- Climate change mitigation
- Climate change vulnerability
- Climate finance
- Climate risk insurance
- Climate risk management
- Economic analysis of climate change
- Economics of climate change mitigation
- Externality
- Market failure
- United Nations Environment Programme Finance Initiative
