= Plug-in electric vehicles in Colorado =

As of September 2023, there were 93,931 electric vehicles on the road in the U.S. state of Colorado. As of September 2023, 11.05% of new vehicle registrations in the state were electric. The most popular EVs in the state in 2023 were the Tesla Model Y and Model 3, with 16,537 and 14,013 registrations, respectively.

== Government policy ==
In 2019, Governor Jared Polis signed an executive order to increase the state's total number of electric vehicles to 940,000 by 2030. As of 2021, the state government's goal is for 100% of vehicles in the state to be electric by 2050.

As of January 2023, the state government offers tax credits of up to $5,000 for electric vehicle purchases.

== Charging stations ==
The Infrastructure Investment and Jobs Act, signed into law in November 2021, allocates US$57 million to electric vehicle charging stations in Colorado.

== By region ==
=== Boulder ===
As of 2017, there were about 1,600 electric vehicles registered in Boulder County.

=== Colorado Springs ===
As of May 2021, there were about 2,000–2,500 electric vehicles in Colorado Springs.

The second electric vehicle dealership in Colorado, and the first in the state outside of the Denver metropolitan area, opened in Colorado Springs in September 2021.

=== Denver ===
As of December 2019, there were about 4,000 electric vehicles registered in Denver. As of April 2021, there were about 600 public charging ports in the city.

As of 2017, there were about 1,100 electric vehicles registered in Jefferson County, 1,000 registered in Arapahoe County, 800 registered in Douglas County, 500 registered in Adams County, and 200 registered in Broomfield.

=== Fort Collins ===
As of 2017, there were about 700 electric vehicles registered in Larimer County.

In March 2021, Fort Collins was ranked by Lawnstarter as the best city in Colorado for electric vehicles, and the fourth-best city in the United States.

=== Grand Junction ===
As of July 2020, there were 25 public charging stations in Grand Junction.

=== Greeley ===
As of 2017, there were about 300 electric vehicles registered in Weld County.

=== Pueblo ===
As of September 2020, there were 19 public charging stations in Pueblo County.
