= Climate change in Colorado =

Climate change in the US state of Colorado

Köppen climate types in Colorado showing half the state to be cold semi-arid, and the remainder to be a mix of other types with many microclimates.

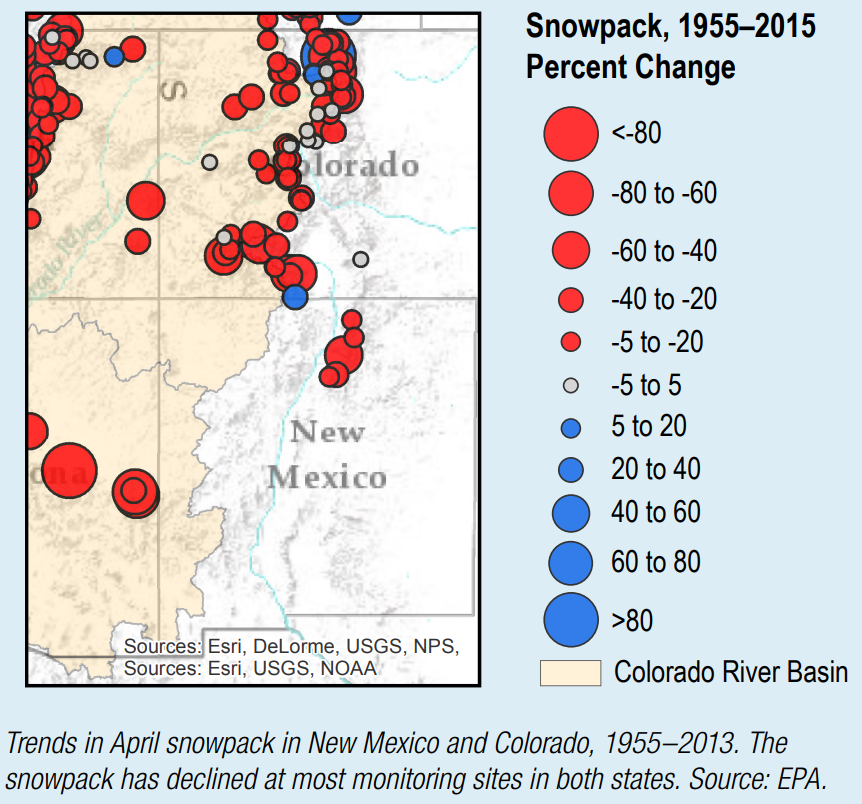
EPA map of changing snowpack levels in Colorado and New Mexico.

Climate change in Colorado encompasses the effects of climate change, attributed to man-made increases in atmospheric greenhouse gases, in the U.S. state of Colorado.

In 2019 The Denver Post reported that "[i]ndividuals living in southeastern Colorado are more vulnerable to potential health effects from climate change than residents in other parts of the state".

According to the EPA, Colorado’s climate has undergone many changes over the course of past decades. Snow is melting frequently, heat waves are more prevalent, and these rising temperatures and droughts are having negative effects on many of the ecosystems in the state. These effects are increasing the fire season, increasing the ability of insects to make it through the winter enabling outbreaks, and impacting the health of soils within the state. The effects of climate change in Colorado are likely to continue to reduce water availability and increase wildfires frequency into the future.

== Snowpack ==
A study by Amato Evan, professor of climate sciences at the Scripps Institution of Oceanography found that the winter season in the Western United States is getting shorter and spring is starting earlier, greatly reducing the window of time in which snow is able to fall. The Environmental Protection Agency (EPA) estimates that snowpack across Colorado has diminished by 20-60% since the 1950s. This allows trees to grow higher than they would otherwise, which is linked to habitat fragmentation.

== Water availability ==
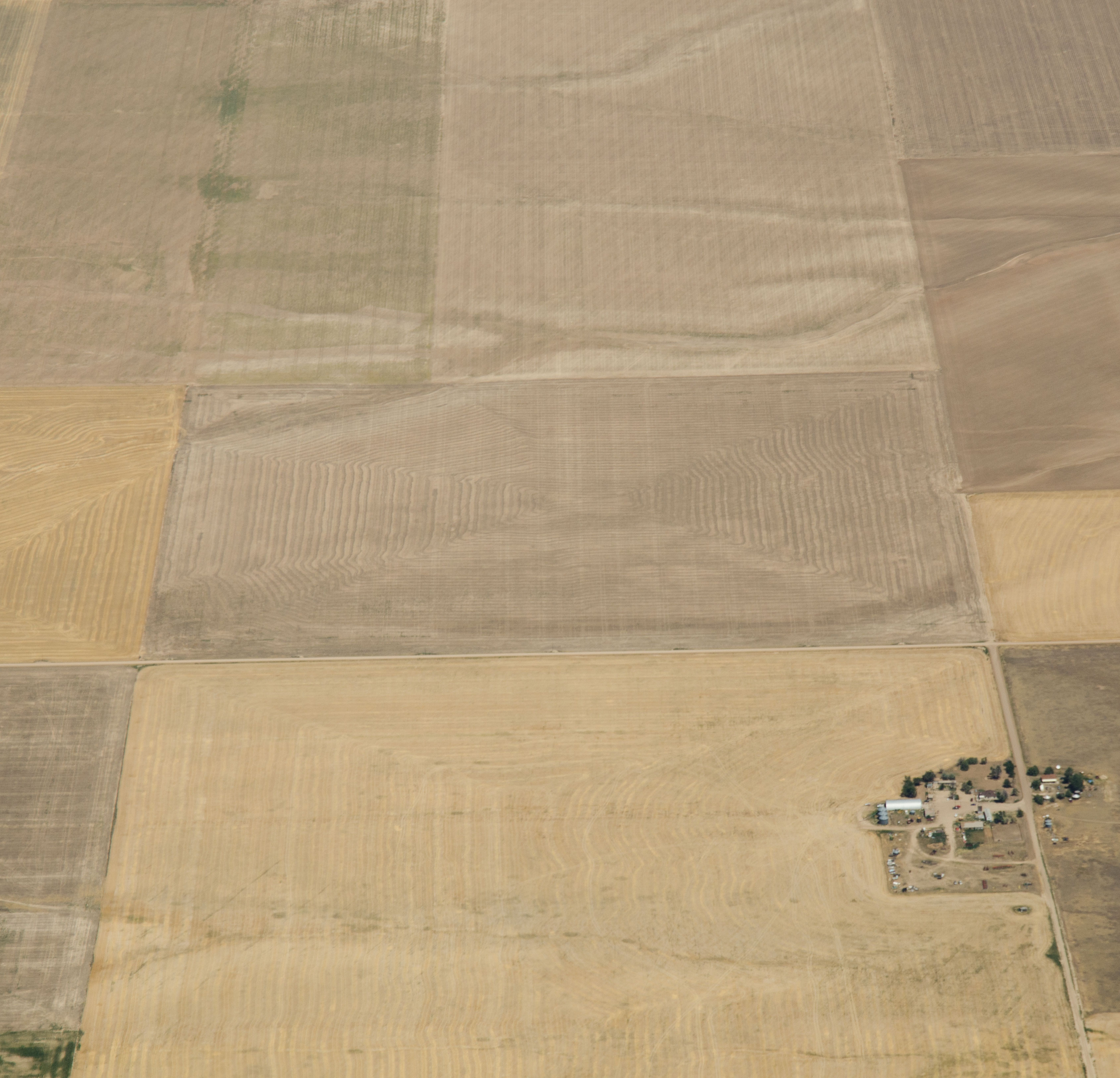
Drought-affected fields near Strasburg, 2012

- Water availability in Colorado is strictly tied to the mountain snowpack. This snowpack builds throughout the winter, then as the temperatures begin to warm in the Spring and Summer, the snow melts flowing into rivers and reservoirs that support agriculture across the region. Recent snowpacks have been smaller over the past 5o years due to increased late season rain, and warm temperatures leading to premature melting. This meltwater is often captured in reservoirs to be used later in the season, but this still leaves many people and ecosystems water limited if they reside above these dams.

According to the EPA "Rising temperatures also increase the rate at which water evaporates (or transpires) into the air from soils and plants. Unless rainfall increases to the same extent as evaporation, soils become drier. As a result, the soil retains more water when it rains, and thus less water runs off into rivers, streams, and reservoirs. During the last few decades, soils have become drier in most of the state, especially during summer. In the decades to come, rainfall during summer is more likely to decrease than increase in Colorado, and periods without rain are likely to become longer. All of these factors would tend to make droughts more severe in the future".

In particular, climate change has reduced the annual flow of Colorado River in the 21st century by almost 20 percent compared to the 20th. The decline has been linked to a reduction in the mountain snowpack through evaporation. Such a change is significant because the river supports 40 million people's water consumption throughout the West and $1 trillion in economic activity.

== Agriculture ==
Colorado's agricultural sector "accounts for 9% of Colorado’s greenhouse gas emissions, or approximately 11.4 million metric tons of CO_{2}."

Implementing regenerative agricultural practices in the state has the potential to remove 23.15 billion tons of CO_{2} from the atmosphere by 2050. Use of cover crops is increasing. A collaboration between Boulder County Parks and Open Space and Colorado State University is working to develop techniques to improve soil health and carbon sequestration. State level support for soil health is under discussion.

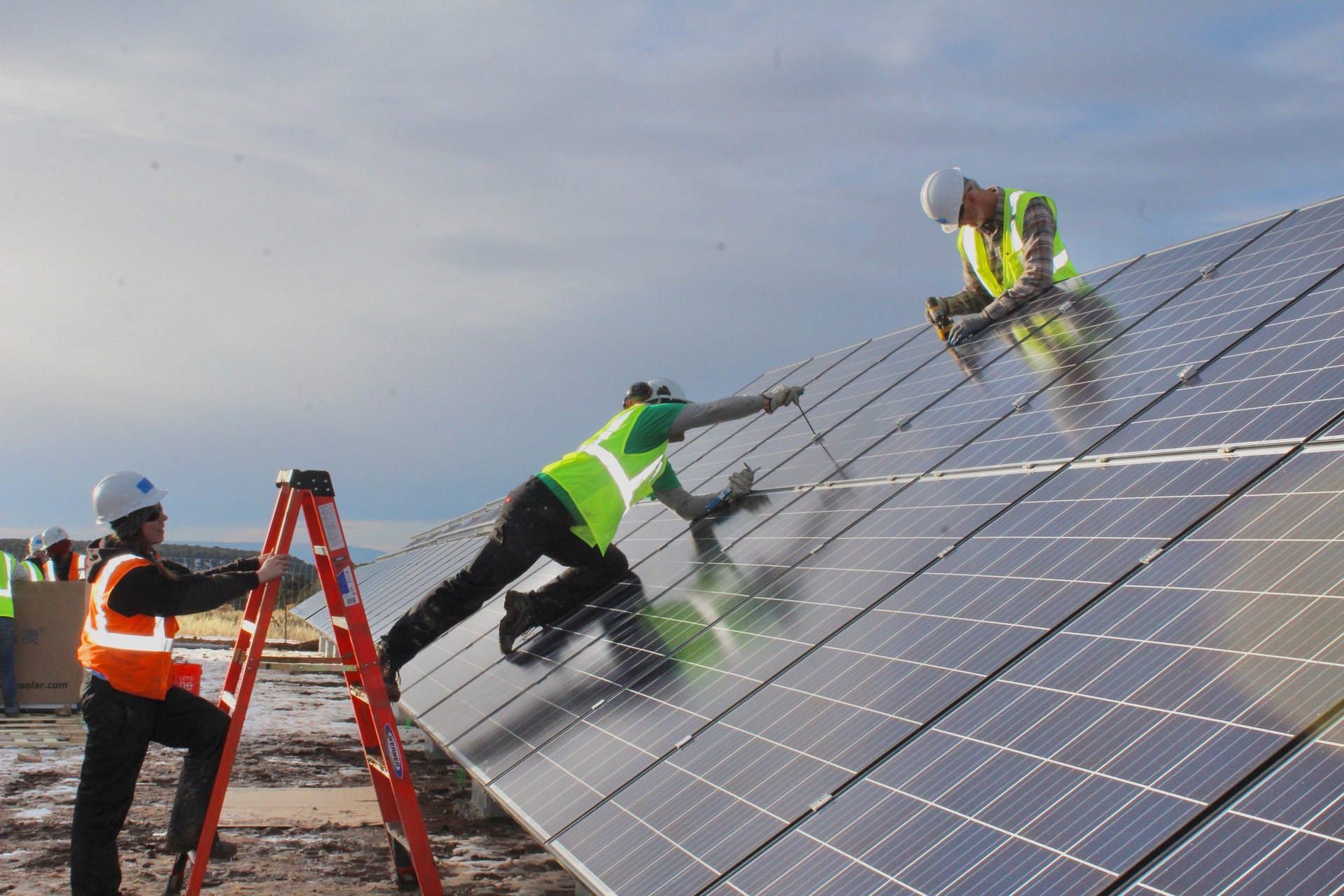
Fitting solar panels, Norwood

== Human health impacts of climate change ==
Climate change is expected to affect human health as changing environmental conditions promote the spread of infectious diseases. Models to predict future mosquito distribution indicate longer breeding seasons, which in turn, result in an increase in the abundance of mosquitoes with likely climate scenarios. Vector-borne diseases such as the West Nile Virus (WNV) are influenced by changes in weather conditions such as temperature, precipitation, and humidity, which create ideal breeding grounds for mosquitoes. Shifting hydrologic conditions can alter the incidence of vector-borne disease as an increase also affects the number of WNV cases seen. Increased precipitation and land wetness can affect the transmission of mosquito-borne diseases similar to WNV. Shifting hydrologic conditions can alter the incidence of vector-borne disease as increased precipitation and land wetness can affect the transmission of mosquito-borne diseases As researchers have come to realize, biological systems are sensitive to small changes in seasonal temperatures, including the spread of infectious disease. Although changes in climate and weather patterns have the ability to contribute to more frequent outbreaks of WNV, local environmental conditions also play a role.

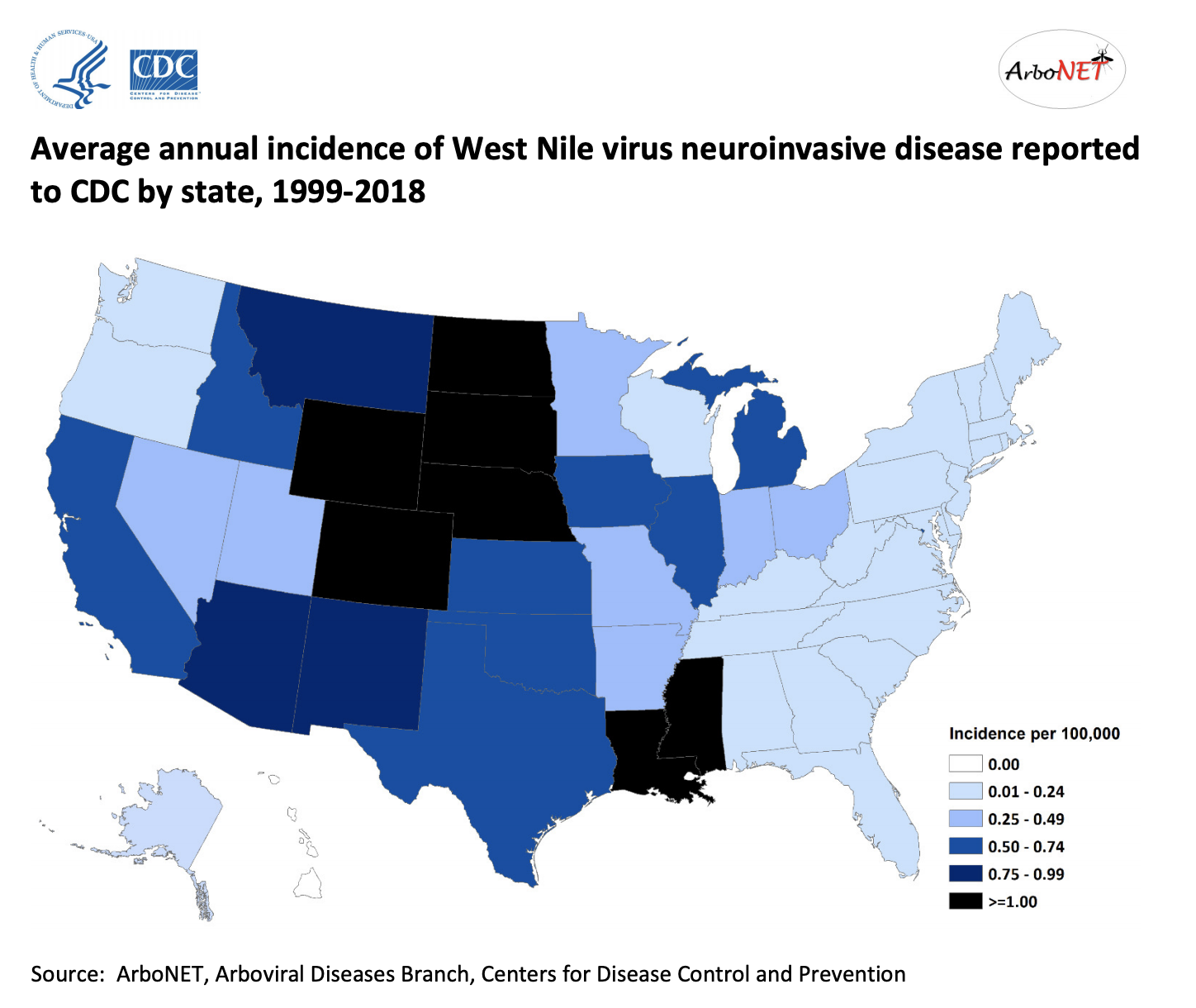
Average Annual Incidence of West Nile Virus Neuroinvasive Disease reported to CDC by State, 1999-2018

WNV is an infectious disease that is spread primarily by mosquitoes. WNV is concerning as it has the capability to cause inflammation in the brain and body tissues. Most individuals do not suffer from extreme symptoms, but mild symptoms include skin rashes, body aches, fevers, and headaches making it difficult to differentiate between a cold or allergic reaction when evaluating one's symptoms. Severe cases of WNV are neuroinvasive, causing symptoms such as encephalitis and meningitis. From 1999 to 2018, Colorado had the fourth-highest incidence of neuroinvasive WNV in the United States.

Cases of WNV have been reported in Colorado every year since 2002. The 5-year historical average of WNV cases in Colorado indicates that most cases appear in late summer months, primarily August and September. Currently, there is no vaccine for WNV, and hospitalization is often required for patients experiencing symptoms. People often outdoors where mosquitoes are present should take precaution by wearing protective clothing and mosquito spray.

== Climate mitigation efforts and greenhouse gases ==
In December 2019, the Colorado Air Quality Control Commission strengthened inspection requirements for oil and gas production facilities and for pipelines in order to reduce greenhouse gas emissions.

In 2021, a Green House Gas Pollution Reduction Road Map was released. This roadmap created many goals including a 50% reduction in pollution by 2030. Many actions were taken to follow this plan including ensuring state buildings are sustainable, investment in electric buses, geothermal energy, monitoring of industrial emissions, a vehicle exchange program and other initiatives.

In 2024, the original road map created in 2021 was revised to include updated goals for the following three years. The plan contains many recommendations for maintaining progress such as updated permitting for clean energy, increasing use of public transportation, and researching uses for old oil and gas wells, among many others.

== See also ==
- List of U.S. states and territories by carbon dioxide emissions
- Plug-in electric vehicles in Colorado
- Climate change in the United States
