= Lawnstarter =

American online platform

LawnStarter
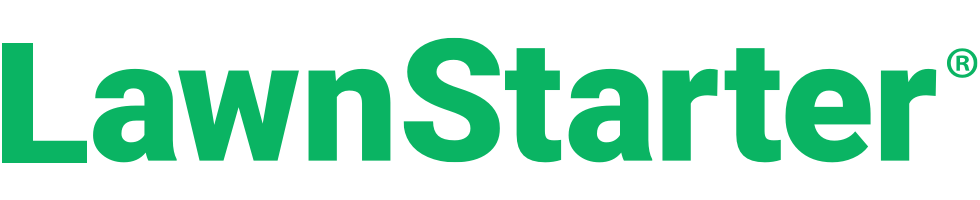
- Type: Private
- Industry: Mowing
- Founded: 2013; 13 years ago in Washington, D.C.
- Founders: Steve Corcoran; Ryan Farley; Jonas Weigert
- Headquarters: Austin, Texas, United States
- Areas served: 3,000 cities across the U.S.
- Key people: Gary Kliegman (COO) Christian Lavender (CMO)
- Products: LawnStarter platform Lawn Love platform
- Website: lawnstarter.com

LawnStarter is an American online platform for mowing. It is based in Austin, Texas.

== History ==
LawnStarter was founded in 2013 in Washington, D.C. by Steve Corcoran, Jonas Weigert, and Ryan Farley. Later, it moved its headquarters to Austin, Texas. In 2014, LawnStarter was accepted into the Techstars Austin accelerator program, following which it relocated its headquarters from Virginia to Austin, Texas.

In January 2015, LawnStarter raised $1 million in seed funding from investors including Gary Vaynerchuk. In June 2015, LawnStarter raised an additional US$6 million in Series A funding led by Binary Capital, and by that time was operating in 12 U.S. cities including Austin, San Diego, Orlando, and Washington, D.C.

In November 2019, LawnStarter received an additional investment of $10.5 million.

In 2020, LawnStarter appointed former Snap executive Arman Panjwani as its chief financial officer. In the same year, LawnStarter was named to the Austin American-Statesman's Greater Austin Top Employers list.

In August 2021, LawnStarter acquired San Diego-based Lawn Love.

== Platform ==
LawnStarter is an online platform that connects homeowners with local lawn care and mowing services through its website and mobile app for iOS and Android. It has been described as an "Uber for lawn services."
