= Climate change in Montana =

Climate change in the US state of Montana

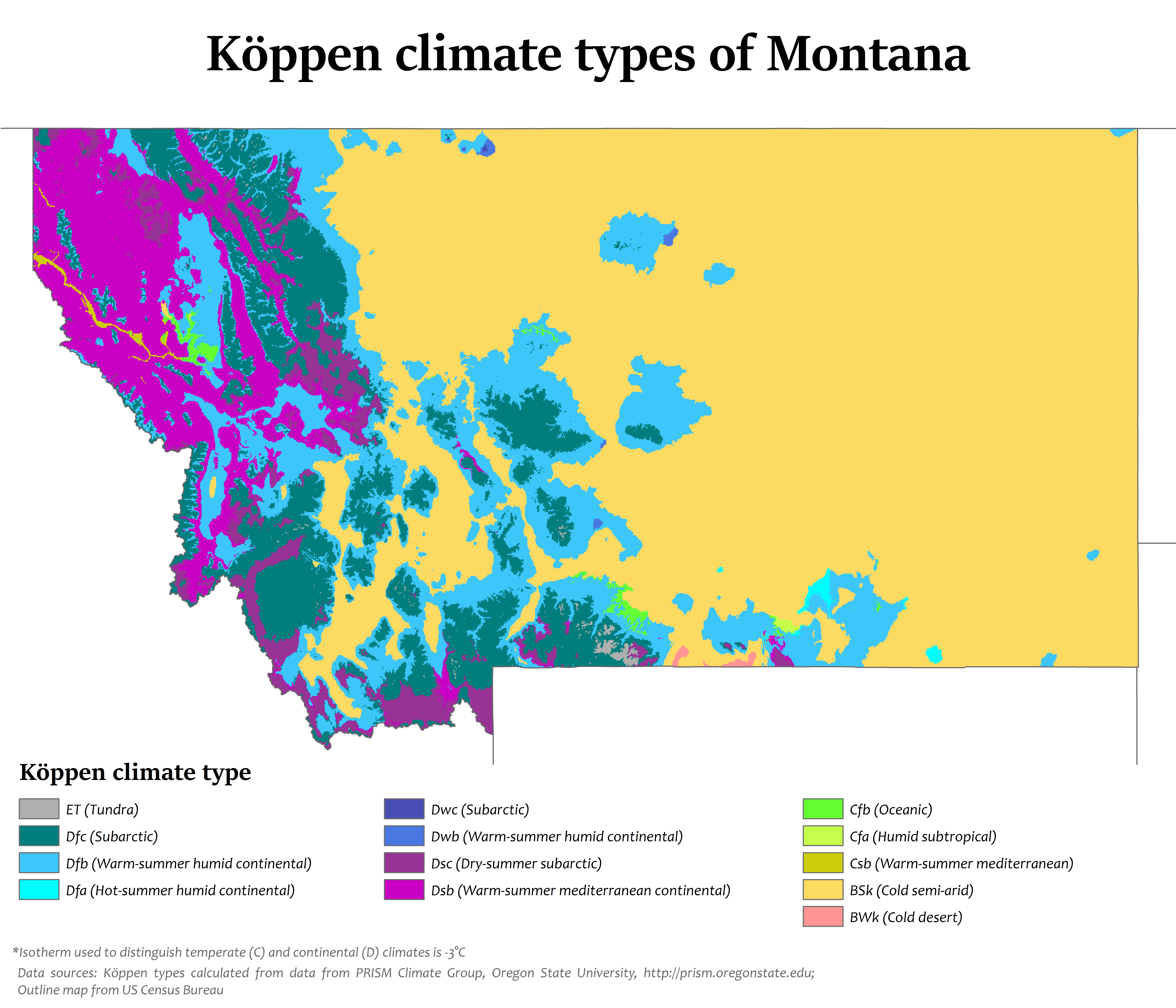
Köppen climate types in Montana.

Climate change is negatively impacting the US state of Montana. Climate change in Montana is causing common heat waves, earlier snow melts in the spring, and a high amount of dying trees due to droughts and forest fires. After a few decades, climate change in Montana will most likely impact water availability, agricultural yields, and cause higher risks for wildfires. State and local governments in Montana have implemented legislative measures to address climate change, including adopting renewable energy portfolios and developing climate action plans.

== Impacts ==
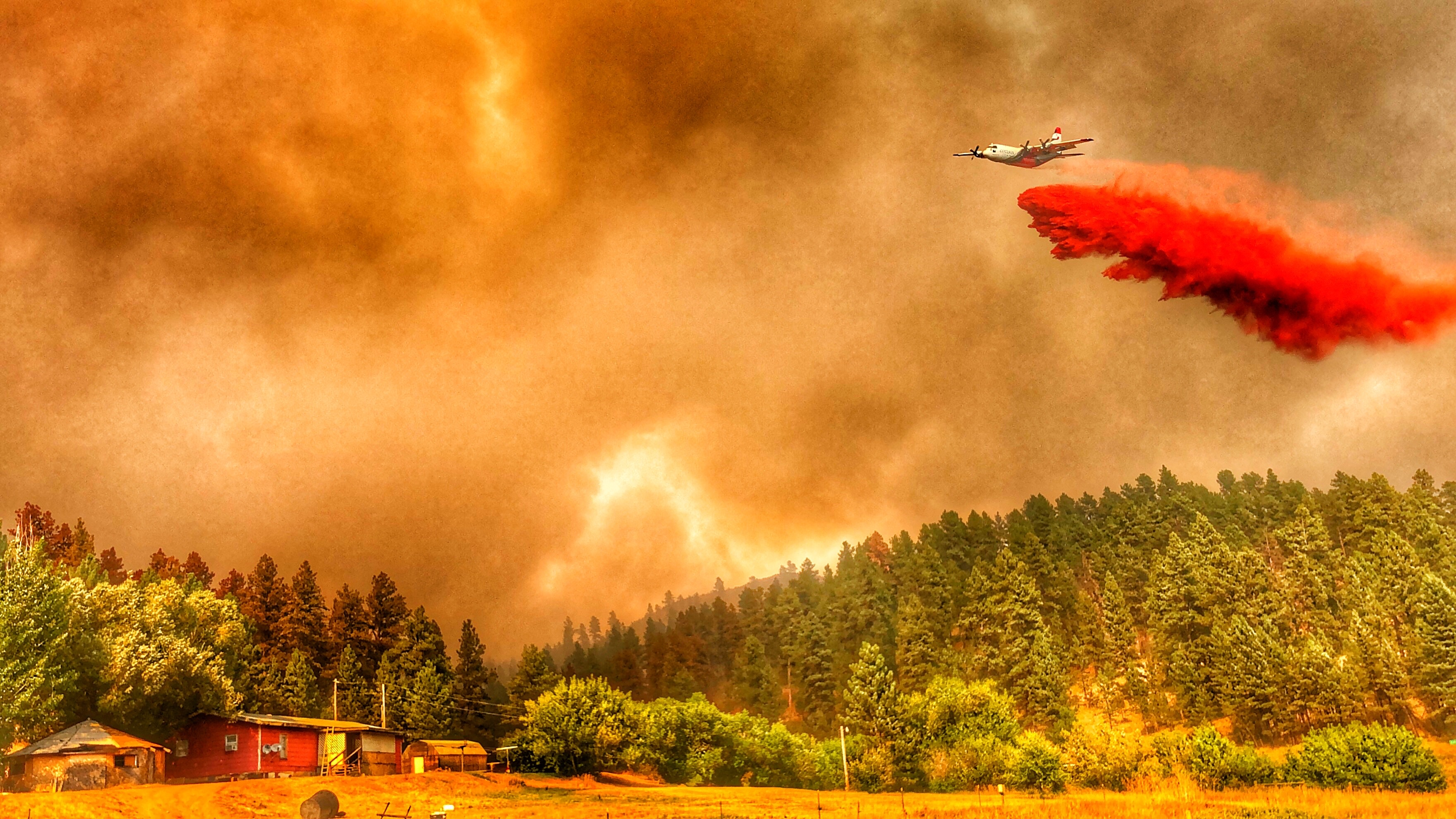
An aircraft drops fire retardant on the 2021 Richard Spring Fire

=== Water resources ===
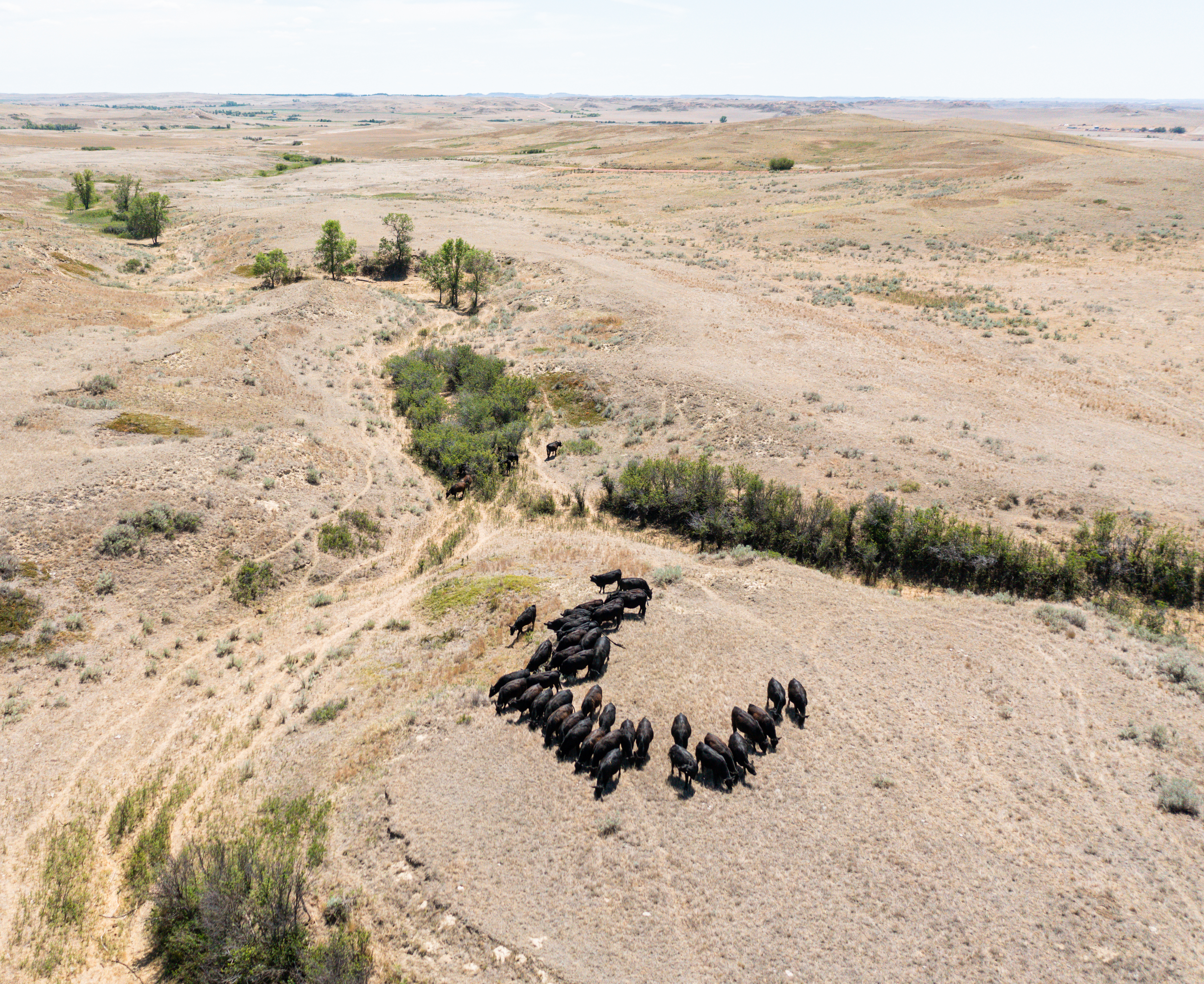
Drought, cattle ranch in Fallon County, June 2021

According to the IPCC, climate change's effects on water systems for the Montana region can decrease water availability in some areas. Climate change in mountain states is projected by the IPCC to cause decreased snowpack, more winter flooding, and reduced summer rains. These weather patterns may increase competition for water resources.

Montana is a headwater state, and consequently, potential climate change effects that impact Montana's water resources reach far beyond the state borders. The Department of Environmental Quality, Montana, has determined that climate change will affect essential water resources in Montana as water quality and ecosystems may be compromised when contaminants and sediment are carried by spring run-off at unnatural times.

A report from the University of Lethbridge found that climate change may alter stream flow and water supply volume by lowering snowpack, which may cause low reservoir storage in the spring and dangerously low flows in the summer, making perennial streams potentially intermittent.

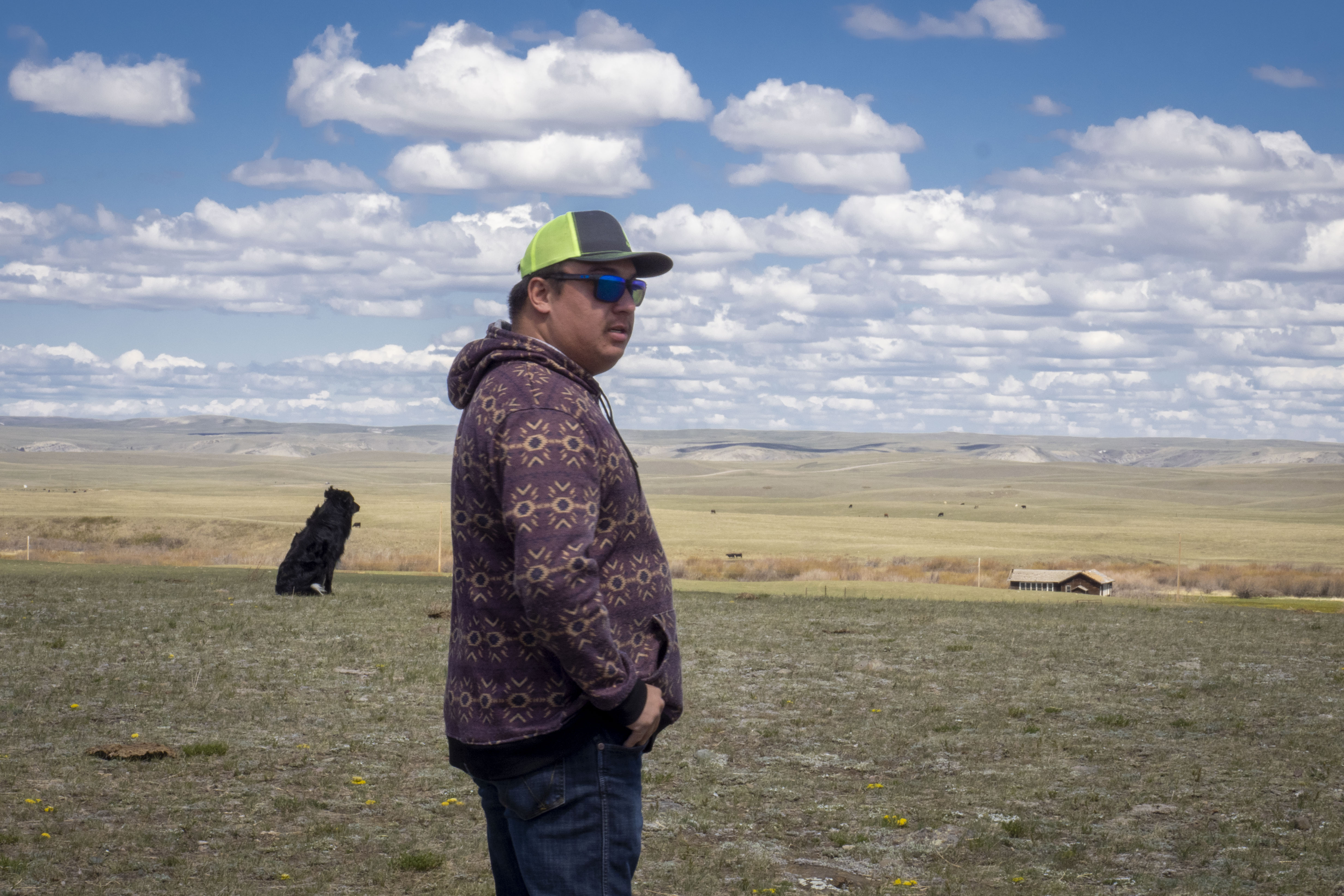
Drought on a cattle ranch, May 2022

The Montana Wildlife Conservation Society is concerned that warming water may also change patterns of some species such as native bull trout, which requires colder water than other fish and would have a difficult time surviving if waters warmed.

=== Forest resources ===
Montana's forests sequester up to 23.1 million metric tons of carbon dioxide equivalents annually—approximately 62 percent of the state's gross emissions. The state also contains 8.9 million acres thought suitable for afforestation with a potential sequestration capacity of up to 15 million metric tons.

The impacts of climate change upon Montana's forests could result in feedback: assuming a shift to a 'drier' precipitation and temperature scenario, the sequestration capacity of Montana's high-elevation forests could be reduced or even eliminated entirely.

=== Agriculture ===
The effects of climate change on agriculture varies among regions. Montana's agricultural production may not change substantially over the short term, according to the IPCC Fourth Assessment Report. For instance, warmer temperatures reduce yield of wheat, but there will be a higher concentration of carbon dioxide, which is favorable. Warmer winters could lead to two crop cycles per year but it could also increase growth of weeds and pests.

There are still issues Montana would face due to the warmer climate. These include reduction of crops that need cooler weather, introduction of diseases and pests that come from warmer climates, and more severe storms and droughts. As for cattle production, in warmer weather cows will eat less and grow more slowly. Livestock also faces heat stress and the spread of parasites.

=== Human health ===
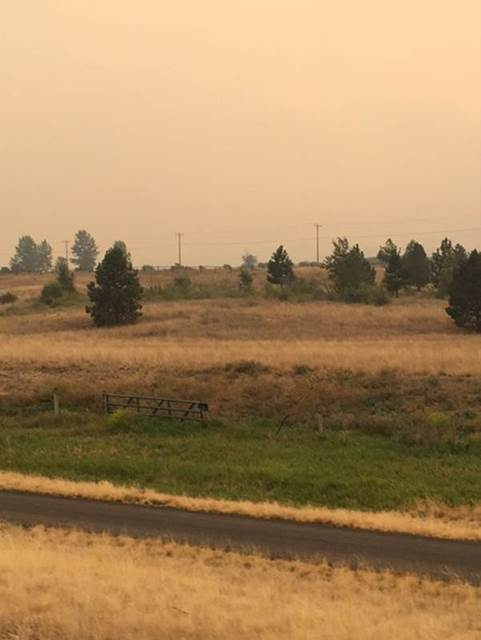
Smoke pollution from wildfire, 2017

Adverse health impacts from climate change have already been documented, and are expected to increase during the twenty-first century. Montanans will experience health impacts from increased temperatures and decreased stream flows that are similar to those in other parts of the country. Decreased summer stream flows will lead to heavier concentrations of pollutants including toxic metals, microbes and nutrients. Higher temperatures and increased forest fires will adversely affect air quality, increasing incidents of asthma, and lung and heart disease. On average, climate change has already extended the allergy season by 20 days annually since 1950.

== State adaptation and mitigation ==
=== Renewables ===
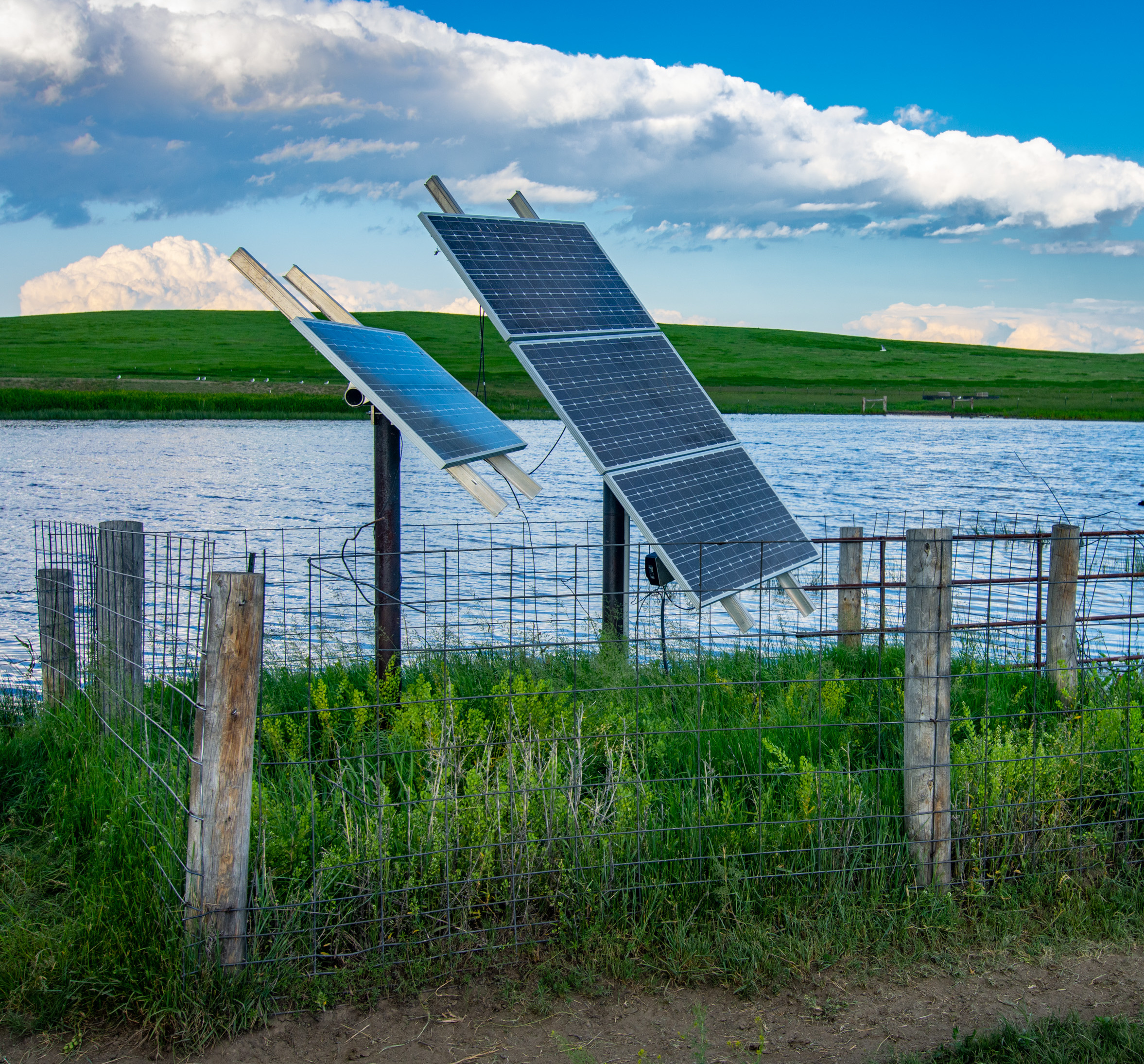
Solar-powered pump, Arbuckle Ranch, Alzada

In April, 2005, Montana established a renewable energy portfolio which requires all public utilities to derive at least 15% of their electricity from renewable energy resources by 2015. Part of Montana's renewable energy development plan is to stimulate rural economic development by requiring public utilities to buy renewable energy credits and electricity generated by community-based energy utility companies. From 2010 to 2014, public utility companies in Montana must purchase 50 MW from these rural community-based utility companies. Beginning in 2015, that figure will grow to 75 MW. Any utility company serving more than 5,000 people is required to create a renewable energy standard which promotes renewable energy development, with specific emphasis on rural economic development.

Currently, Montana's renewable energy is derived primarily from wind energy, geothermal energy and solar energy. Montana offers many tax incentives and loan programs for individuals and businesses to promote renewable energy development at all levels in both the private and the public sector. This renewable-energy promoting legislation includes production incentives, utility grants and loans, a green power program, property tax exemptions, and production tax reductions.

In 2009, Montana received $10.3 million in federal Recovery Act funding to improve the energy efficiency of state buildings and expand renewable energy use and recycling infrastructure in the state. The funds will also be used for grants to encourage use of new clean energy technologies that have moved into the production phase but are not yet well known or utilized in the state. Montana Department of Environmental Quality (DEQ) will also extend low-interest loans to consumers, businesses, and nonprofit organizations to install various renewable energy systems, including wind, solar, geothermal, hydro and biomass.

Wind

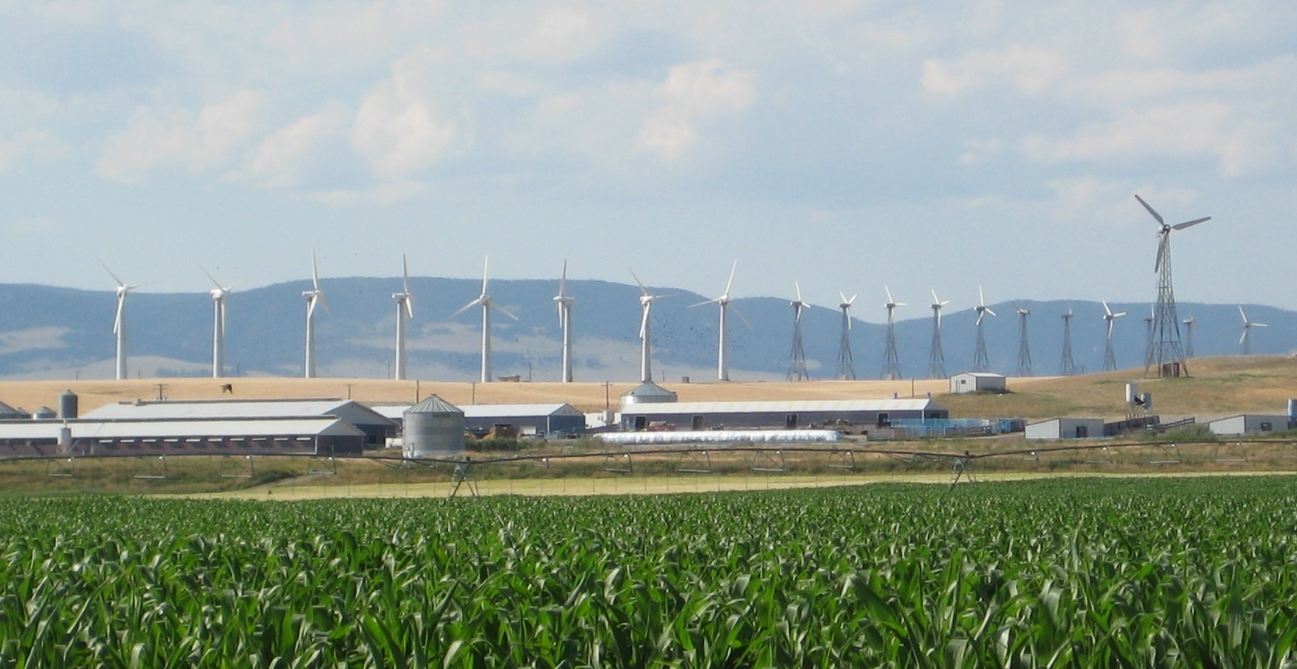
Wind turbines, Martinsdale

Montana is ranked among the top five states in the nation for wind power generation potential. As of 2009, Montana produced 820,924 MWh of wind-generated electricity, which represented more than three percent of all electricity generated in Montana that year. Montana is ranked first in the nation for wind speed of class 3 and above, with the majority of wind sites located in areas of low population, near communities that favor wind energy development. Montana Department of Environmental Quality maintains monitoring data from current wind-powered facilities and provides that data to people who are interested in wind energy investment opportunities in the state. The Energy Promotion and Development Division "facilitates a wind and transmission working group that consists of industry, government, academic and other stakeholders. The group has been meeting quarterly since April 2008 and it convenes to identify obstacles to transmission and wind development and to develop strategies to overcome those obstacles."

Large-scale wind farms in Montana currently include Glacier wind farm near Shelby, Judith Gap wind farm in Wheatland County, Diamond Willow wind farm near Baker, MT, and Horseshoe Bend Wind Park near Great Falls. Detailed wind power maps are available on MDEQ's official site.

Geothermal

In May, 2005, the State of Montana, Department of Energy (DOE) and Sage Resources of Missoula, Montana established the Montana Geothermal Program. Montana's potential for large-scale geothermal energy development is still being evaluated. DOE's Geopowering the West program indicates that Montana has more than 25,000 square miles of high-potential sites and areas.

Currently, Montana has 15 high-temperature sites located near White Sulphur Springs, Helena, Ennis, Bozeman, Butte and Boulder, and more than 50 designated geothermal areas of varying temperatures across the entire state. A total of twenty-seven known sites have surface temperatures ranging from 110 °F to above 149 °F, and current temperature estimates for deep reservoirs exceeding 350 °F. An interactive topographic map providing details about Montana's principal geothermal sites is available on MDEQ's official site.

Solar

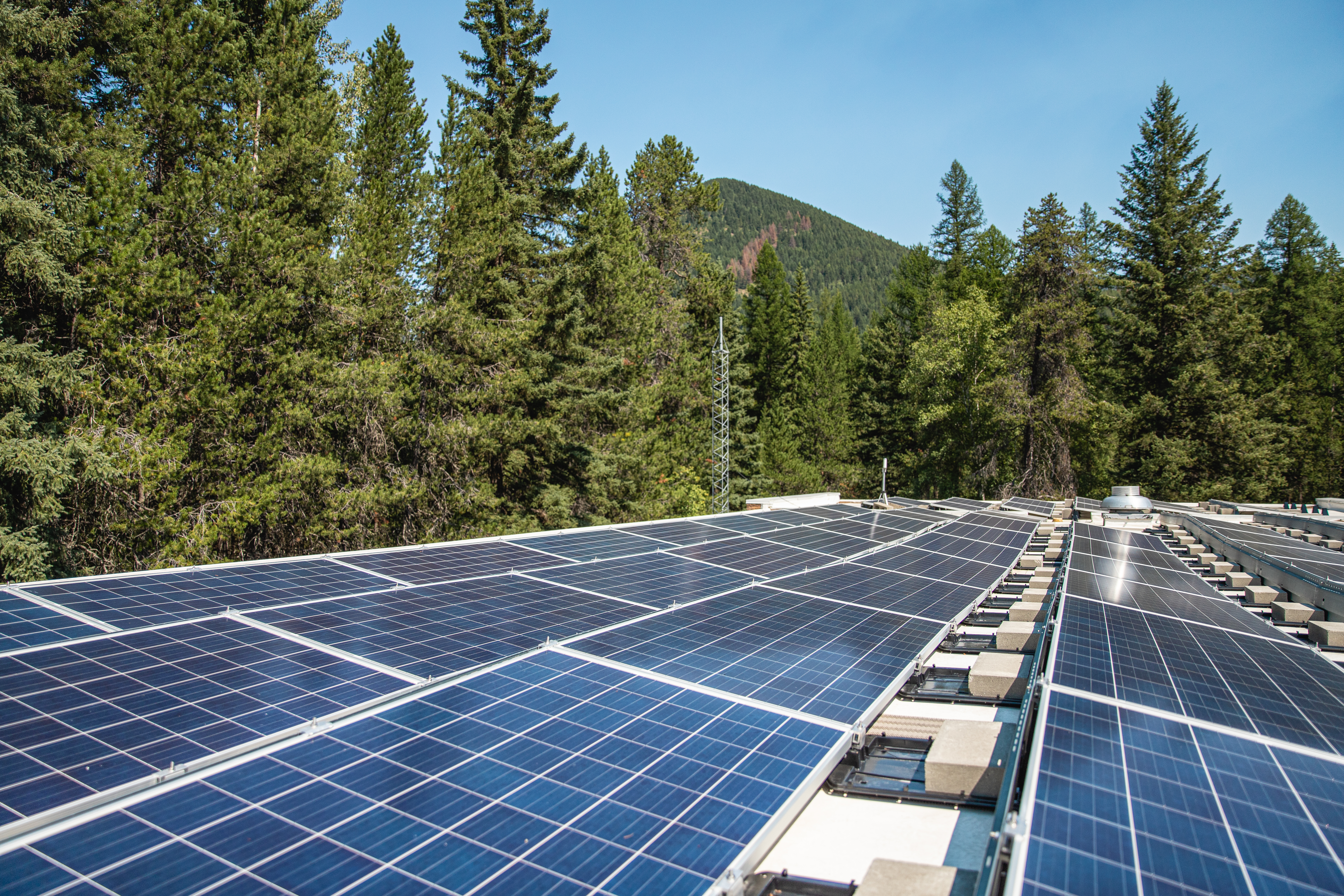
Solar installation, Glacier National Park

Currently, most of Montana's solar energy projects are undertaken at the residential or small-scale municipal level in homes, ranches, schools, community buildings and businesses. The feasibility of larger-scale solar energy generation facilities in Montana continues to be researched. Eastern Montana receives an annual average of 5 hours of full sun, and western Montana receives an annual average of 4.2 hours. Therefore, Montana has adequate solar resources to support more widespread development of solar energy in the future.

The State of Montana currently offers numerous tax incentives and revolving loan programs to encourage solar energy development projects. Details of those programs can also be found on MDEQ's official site.

=== Local government ===
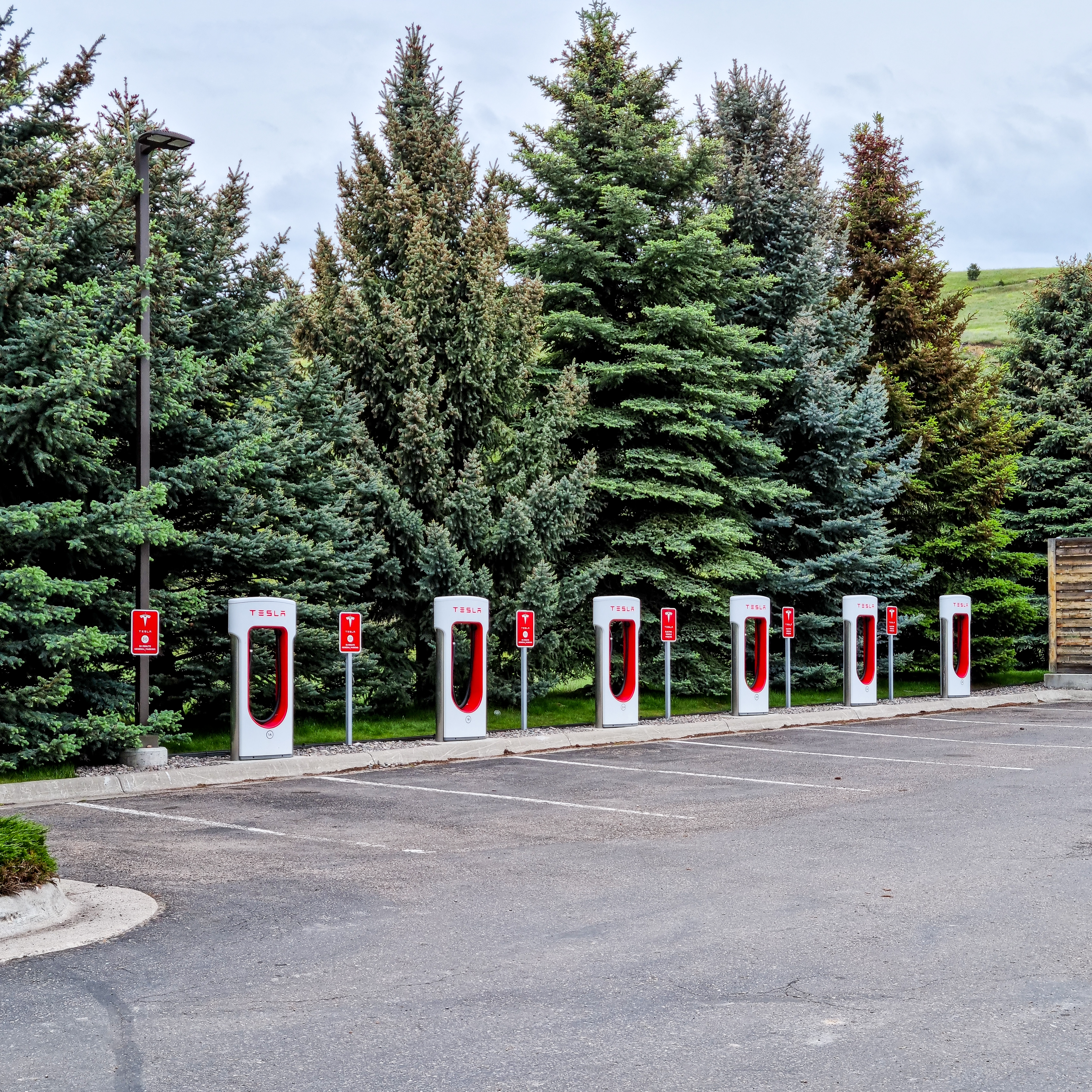
Tesla Supercharger installation, 2022

In 2007, Montana published its comprehensive Climate Change Action Plan and became the seventh U.S. state to join the Western Climate Initiative (WCI). Shortly thereafter, numerous local governments across the state began to develop formal climate change policies and greenhouse gas emission standards to be implemented at the local level. The standards published in the local climate change action plans are largely patterned after Montana's comprehensive Climate Change Action Plan.

In 2009, Helena issued its community climate action plan.

In 2011, Bozeman released its final climate action plan and so did Missoula County.

Additionally, Montana State University and University of Montana also issued climate change action plans for the campus communities.

In late 2011, Missoula County's Clark Fork Coalition began the process of developing climate action strategies as well.

In 2018, the Confederated Salish and Kootenai Tribes began a comprehensive climate adaptation planning process.

In 2018, the City of Red Lodge adopted an Energy Conservation Plan to reduce greenhouse gas emissions to 50% of 2016 levels by 2040.

=== Otter Creek ===
==== Background ====
In the mid 1990s, the federal government purchased a large tract of property neighboring Yellowstone National Park in order to prevent a proposed gold mine from being developed on the land. As a result of the land transaction, Montana stood to lose substantial revenue from mining royalties, and requested that the state be compensated for the loss. After a period of negotiation, the federal government agreed to transfer its ownership in the Otter Creek coal tracts to the state. The Tracts were located in south-eastern Montana, in an area rich with coal but largely undeveloped. At the time of the sale, the Tracts were surrounded by a checkerboard pattern of private property owned by a large real estate company; Great Northern Properties. Several years after Montana took ownership of the Tracts, Great Northern Properties sold its interest in the surrounding properties to Arch Coal, Inc., the second largest coal developed in the United States.

In 2009, the Montana State Land Board, the body responsible for deciding how Montana's state lands will be managed, voted to seek bids from development companies interested in the Otter Creek Tracts. After the initial bidding period ended with no bids received, the Land Board lowered the price per ton and resubmitted the Tracts for bidding. Arch Coal was the only bidder for the Otter Creek Tracts In March 2010, the Land Board voted 3–2 to accept Arch Coal's bid for the Tracts.

==== Litigation ====
In reaching its decision to lease the Tracts, the Land Board was not required, under state statute, to consider any environmental impacts or consequences that would result from the proposed mine. After the Land Board approved the leases, Northern Plains Resource Council and other conservation groups filed suit in the Sixteenth Judicial District in Broadus, Montana. The groups argued in court documents that the Land Board did not consider the impacts on climate change that the new mine would have and that the Land Board did not consider a single alternative to the full development of the mine, as required by the Montana Environmental Policy Act.

Montana moved the court to dismiss the lawsuit, arguing that it lacked legal standing to challenge the Land Board's decision, that the Montana Environmental Policy Act did not apply to decisions of the Land Board, and that the statute allowing the Land Board to not consider any environmental impacts was constitutional.

After hearing argument on the issues, the court denied Montana's dismissal of the suit and allowed the case to proceed on the merits. As of November 2011, the case is still being litigated in the Sixteenth Judicial District.

=== Lawsuits ===
==== Climate change trust litigation ====
In May, 2011, several parents filed lawsuits on behalf of their minor children in the Montana Supreme Court. The parents argued that the atmosphere was a public resource held in trust by Montana for the benefit Montana citizens, and that the state had an affirmative duty to protect that resource from harm like climate change. The petition to the Montana Supreme Court listed many climate change related impacts that were occurring within the state and argued that "public trust" was impacted by these changes.

Initially, the state did not respond to the lawsuit filed by the parents. The Montana Supreme Court however, ordered the state Attorney General’s office to respond to the petition. When the state Attorney General’s office did respond, they did not attack the merits of the parents’ argument but rather challenged the procedural posture of the case. The parents had filed their case under the "original jurisdiction" of the Montana Supreme Court, rather than an appeal. The original jurisdiction of the Montana Supreme Court was limited by the Montana Constitution. The Attorney General's office argued that the parents had failed to establish that the case fell within the bounds of the Supreme Court's original jurisdiction and argued that the high Court deny the petition in favor of the normal, lower court process.

The Supreme Court agreed with the Attorney General's office and dismissed the petition for original jurisdiction. The Court stated that the complexity of the case and the amount of factual determinations that had to be made were better suited for a fact-finding lower court, rather than the state's high court.

==== Held v. Montana ====
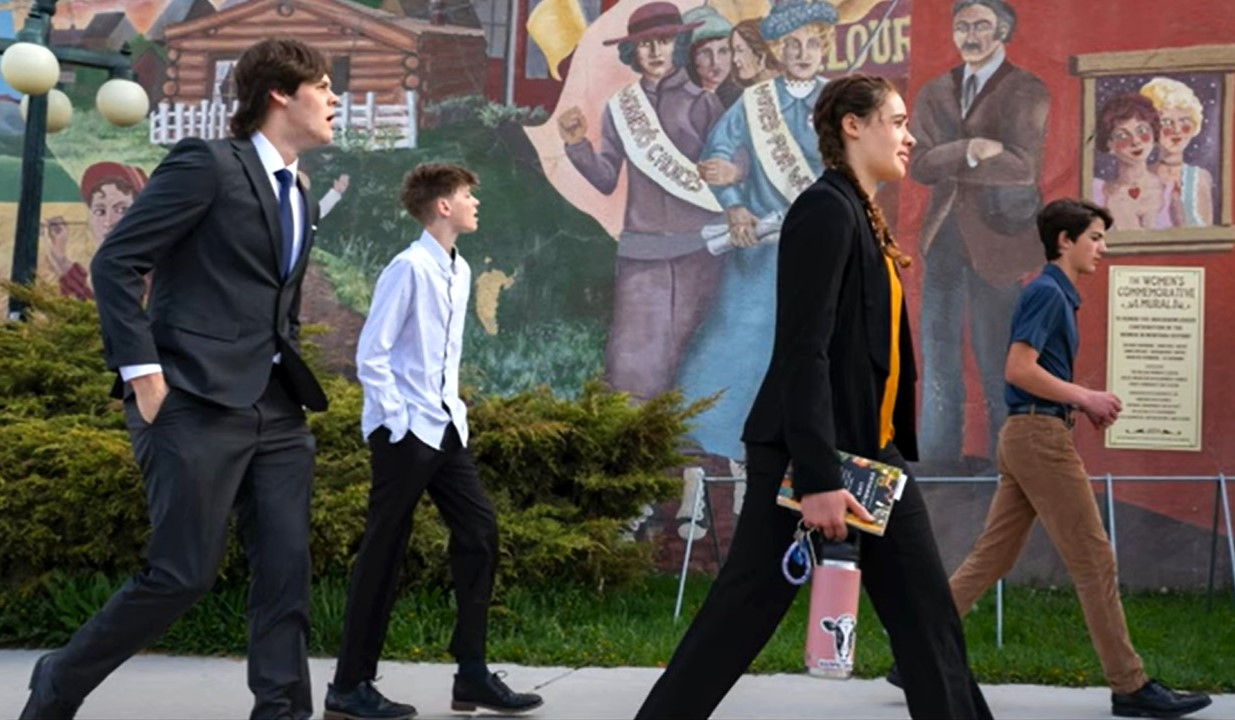
Plaintiffs in Held v Montana

Held v. Montana is the first constitutional law climate lawsuit to go to trial in the United States. The case was filed in March 2020 by sixteen youth residents of Montana, then aged 2 through 18.

The plaintiffs argued that the state's support of the fossil fuel industry had worsened the effects of climate change on their lives, thus denying their right to a "clean and healthful environment in Montana for present and future generations" as required by the Constitution of Montana.

In the trial, held in June 2023, the plaintiffs challenged a law that prohibited the state from considering greenhouse gas emissions as a factor when deciding whether to issue permits for energy-related projects. On August 14, 2023, the trial court judge ruled in the youth plaintiffs' favor, though the state indicated it would appeal the decision. Montana's Supreme Court heard oral arguments on July 10, 2024, its seven justices taking the case under advisement. On December 18, 2024, the Montana Supreme Court upheld the county court ruling.

=== Statutes ===
In May 2023, Republican lawmakers passed a law—possibly the nation’s most aggressive anti-climate action law—prohibiting state agencies from considering climate change impacts when considering permits for projects like coal mines and fuel power plants. A decade-old state law already prohibited the state from considering "actual or potential impacts that are regional, national, or global in nature".

== See also ==
- Plug-in electric vehicles in Montana
