= Climate change in Arizona =

Climate change in the US state of Arizona

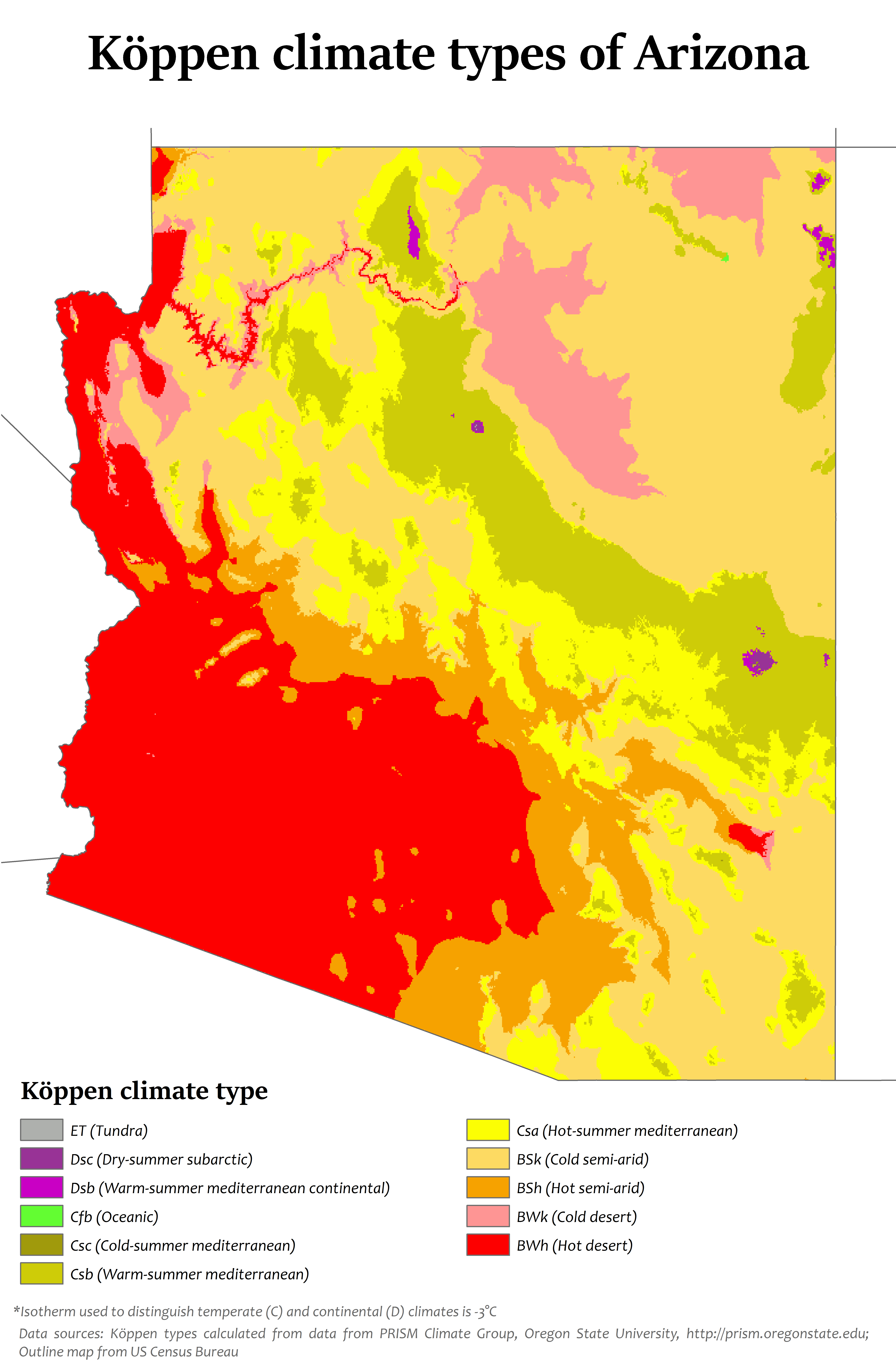
Köppen climate types in Arizona show a preponderance of arid and desert environments.

Climate change in Arizona encompasses the effects of climate change, attributed to man-made increases in atmospheric carbon dioxide, in the U.S. state of Arizona.

It has been asserted that Arizona "will suffer more than most of U.S." due to climate change. According to the United States Environmental Protection Agency, Arizona "has warmed about two degrees (F) in the last century. Throughout the southwestern United States, heat waves are becoming more common, and snow is melting earlier in spring. In the coming decades, changing the climate is likely to decrease the flow of water in the Colorado River, threaten the health of livestock, increase the frequency and intensity of wildfires, and convert some rangelands to desert".

Adaptation includes managing water resources, proposals to redesign urban downtown areas, and potential application of passive daytime radiative cooling technology.

== Environmental impacts ==
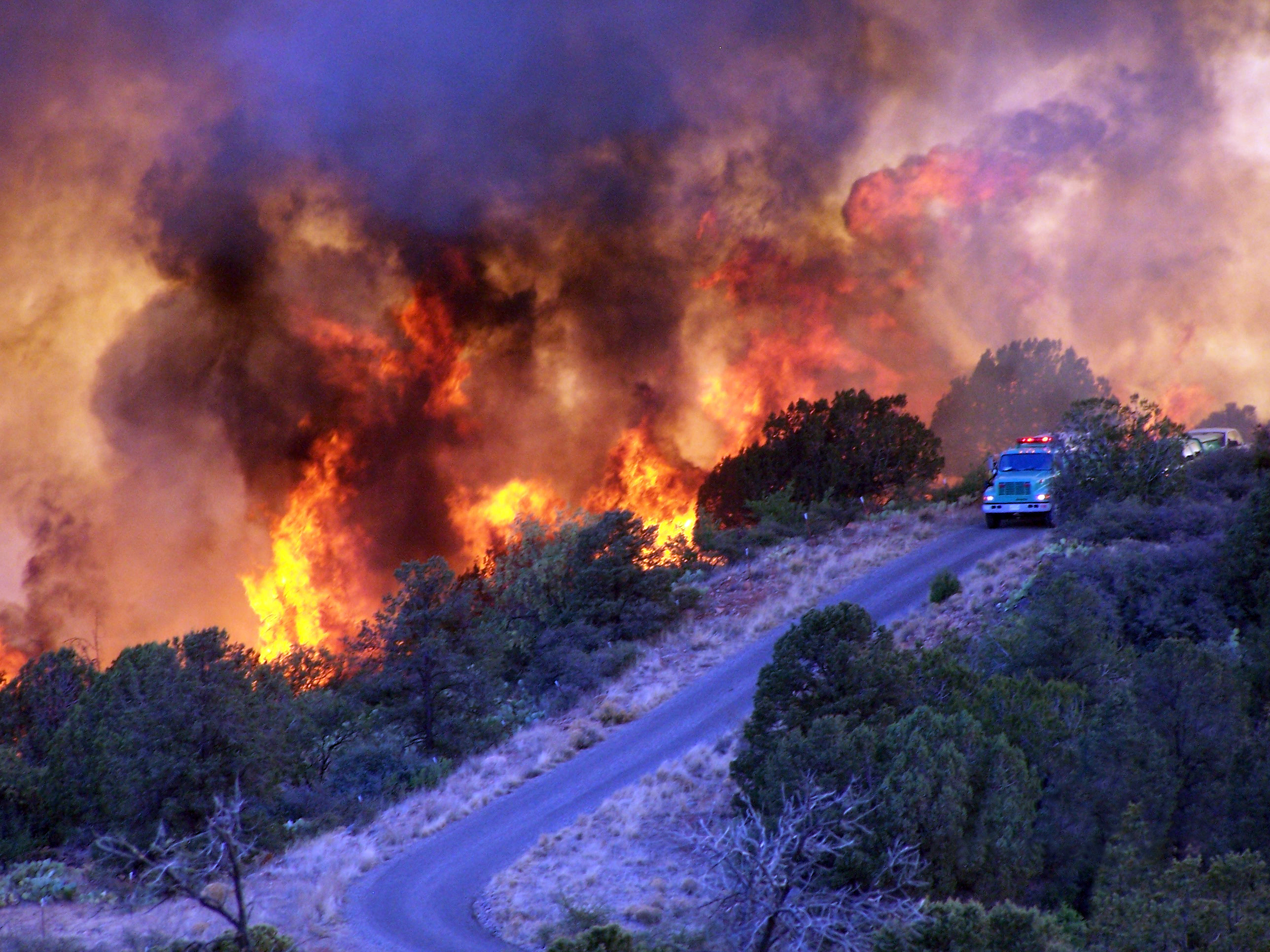
La Barranca wildfire near Sedona, 2006

=== Snowpack ===
According to the United States Environmental Protection Agency (EPA) "As the climate warms, less precipitation falls as snow, and more snow melts during the winter. That decreases snowpack—the amount of snow that accumulates over the winter. Since the 1950s, the snowpack has been decreasing in Arizona, as well as most mountainous areas in the Colorado River Basin. Diminishing snowpack can decrease water supplies and shorten the season for skiing and other forms of winter tourism and recreation".

=== Water availability ===
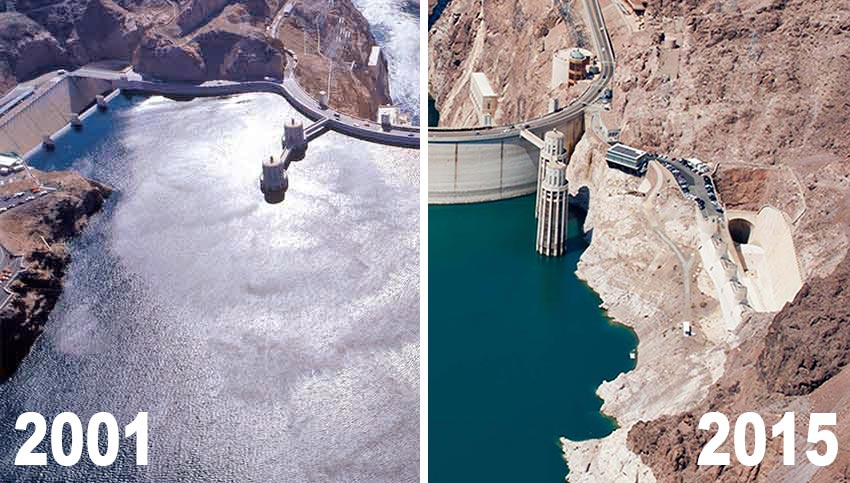
Drought effect on Lake Mead, shown in 2001 and 2015

Lake Powell surface area shrinkage, 1999 to 2021

According to the EPA "The changing climate is likely to increase the need for water but reduce the supply. Rising temperatures increase the rate at which water evaporates (or transpires) into the air from soils, plants, and surface waters. Irrigated farmland would thus need more water. But less water is likely to be available, because precipitation is unlikely to increase enough to make up for the additional water lost to evaporation. Annual precipitation has decreased in Arizona during the last century, and it may continue to decrease. So soils are likely to be drier, and periods without rain are likely to become longer, making droughts more severe".

According to the EPA "The decline in snowpack could further limit the supply of water for some purposes. Mountain snowpacks are natural reservoirs. They collect the snow that falls during winter and release water when the snow melts during spring and summer. Over the past 50 years, the snowpack throughout the Colorado River Basin has been melting earlier in the year (see map on back page). Dams capture most meltwater and retain it for use later in the year. But upstream of these reservoirs, less water is available during droughts for ecosystems, fish, water-based recreation, and landowners who draw water directly from a flowing river".

=== Wildfires ===
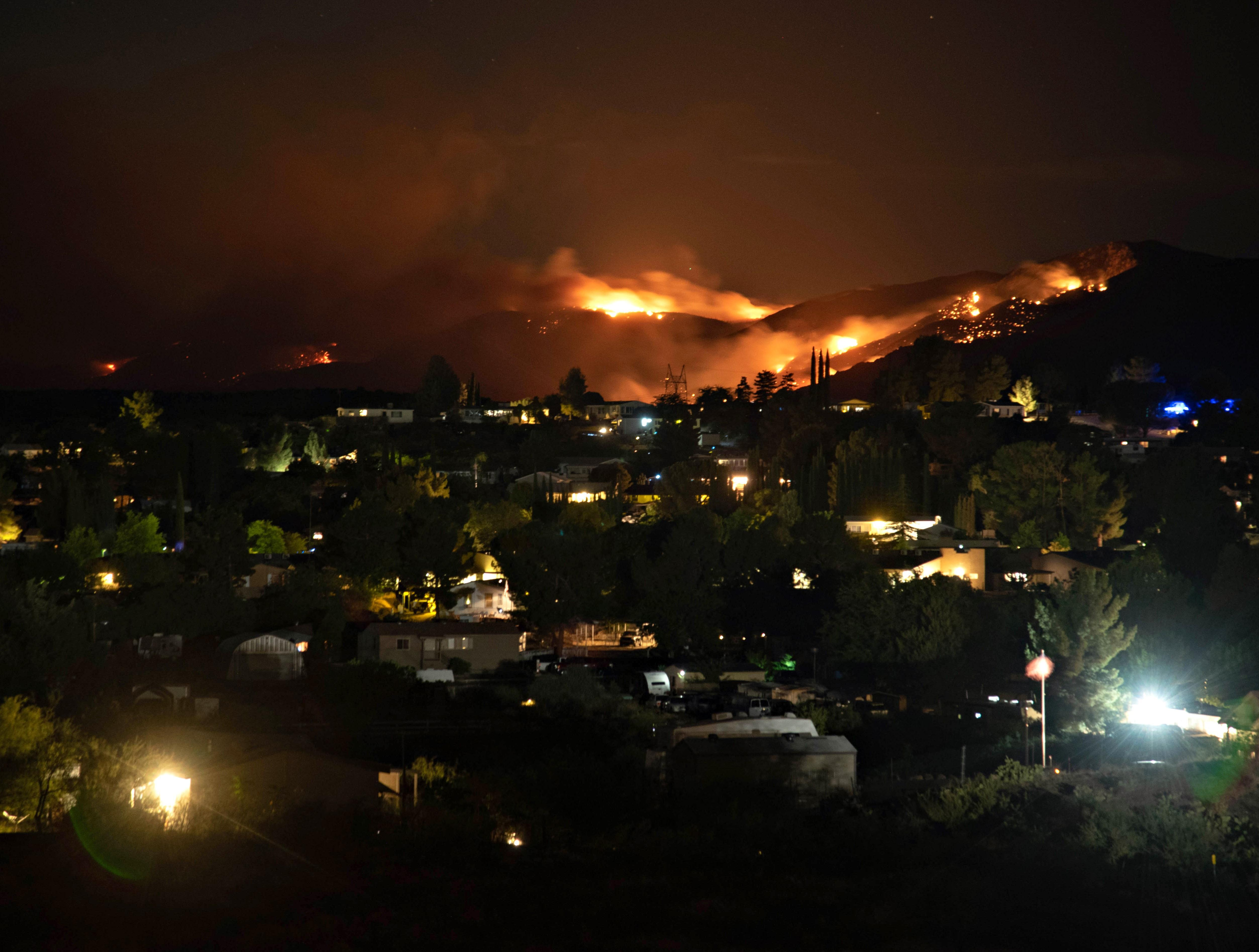
Houses below Tiger Fire, 2021

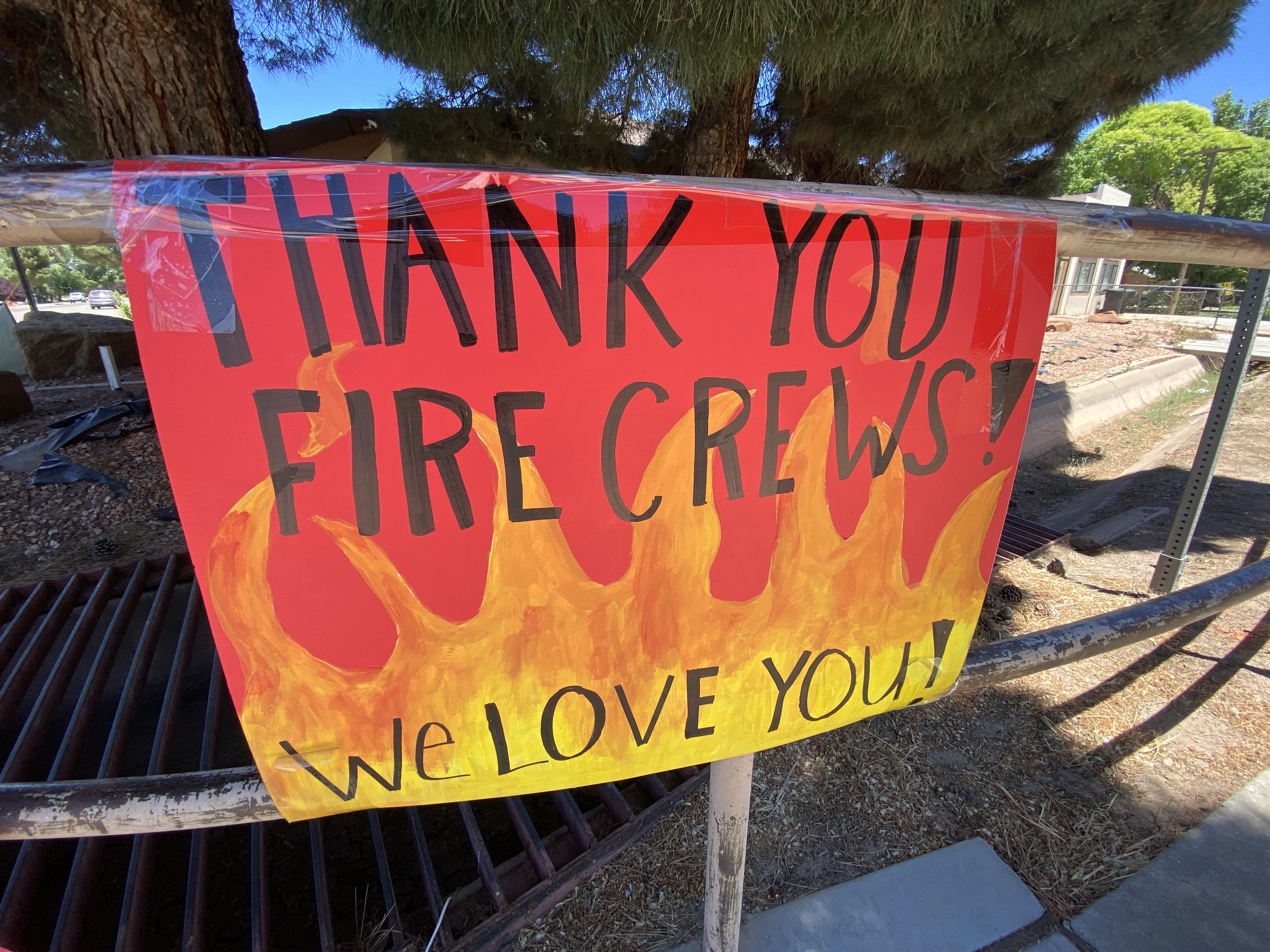
Sign thanking fire crews, Mangum Fire, 2020

Climate change contributes to increased frequency of wildfire in the western United States. From 1984 to 2015, climate change doubled the amount of land area burned by wildfire in the western United States. Climate change makes wildfires more likely by drying forests. Wildfires have numerous negative impacts on human health by worsening air quality, which contributes to respiratory issues, heart problems, and more.

=== Changing Landscapes ===
According to the EPA "The combination of more fires and drier conditions may expand deserts and otherwise change parts of Arizona's landscape. Many plants and animals living in arid lands are already near the limits of what they can tolerate. A warmer and drier climate would generally extend the Sonoran and Chihuahuan deserts to higher elevations and expand their geographic ranges. In some cases, native vegetation may persist and delay or prevent expansion of the desert. In other cases, fires or livestock grazing may accelerate the conversion of grassland to desert in response to a changing climate. For similar reasons, some forests may change to desert or grassland".

=== Pests ===
According to the EPA "Warmer and drier conditions make forests more susceptible to pests. Drought reduces the ability of trees to mount a defense against attacks from pests such as bark beetles, which have infested 100,000 acres in Arizona. Temperature controls the life cycle and winter mortality rates of many pests. With higher winter temperatures, some pests can persist year-round, and new pests and diseases may become established".

== Economic and social impacts ==
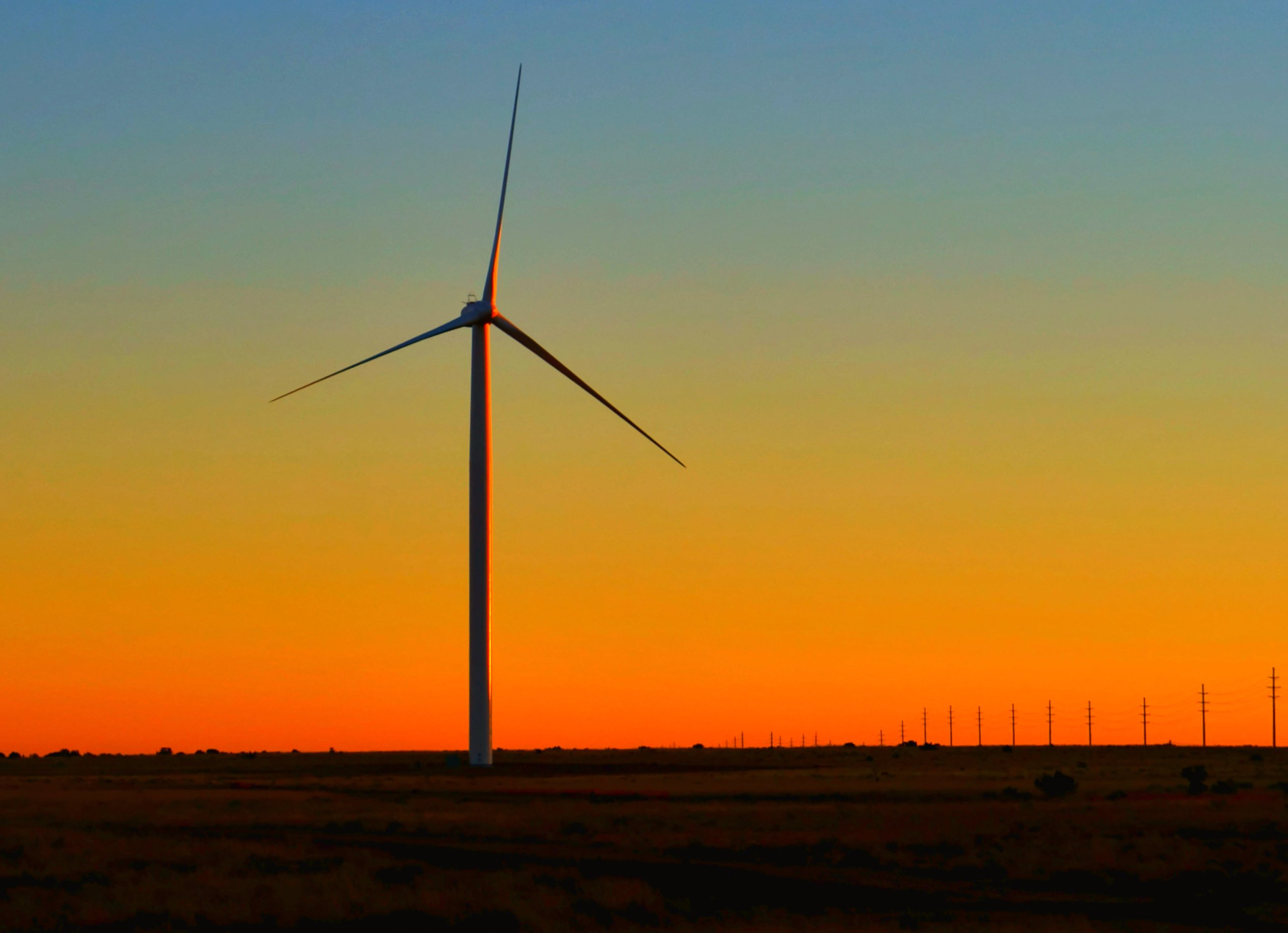
Wind turbine at dusk, Snowflake

By 2040 to 2060, six of Arizona`s 15 counties-- Mohave, Yuma, Maricopa, Pinal, Graham, and Cochise--may become uninhabitable for humans, because of accelerating climate change. This was the cautionary warning made by a December 2020 study released by ProPublica and Rhodium Group.

=== Agriculture ===
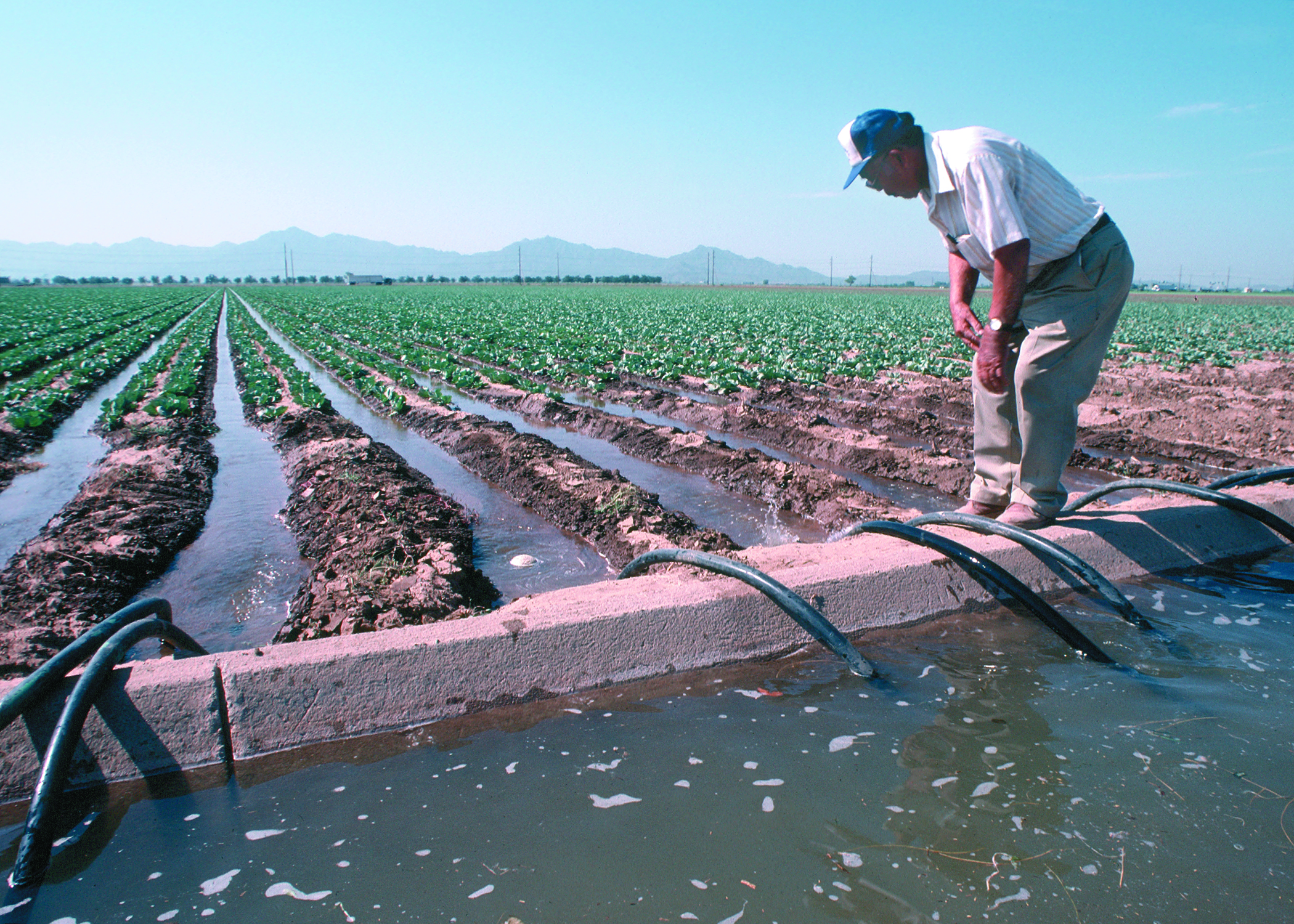
Irrigation near Phoenix, Arizona

According to Andrew Berardy and Mikhail V. Chester "Interdependent systems providing water and energy services are necessary for agriculture. Climate change and increased resource demands are expected to cause frequent and severe strains on these systems. Arizona is especially vulnerable to such strains due to its hot and arid climate". According to the EPA "Increasing droughts and higher temperatures are likely to affect Arizona's top agricultural products: cattle, dairy, and vegetables. Hot temperatures threaten cows' health and cause them to eat less, grow more slowly, and produce less milk. Livestock operations could also be impaired by fire, the lack of water, and changes in the landscape from grassland to woody shrubs more typical of a desert. Reduced availability of water would also create challenges for irrigated farms, which account for two-thirds of the water used in the state".

=== Tribal communities ===
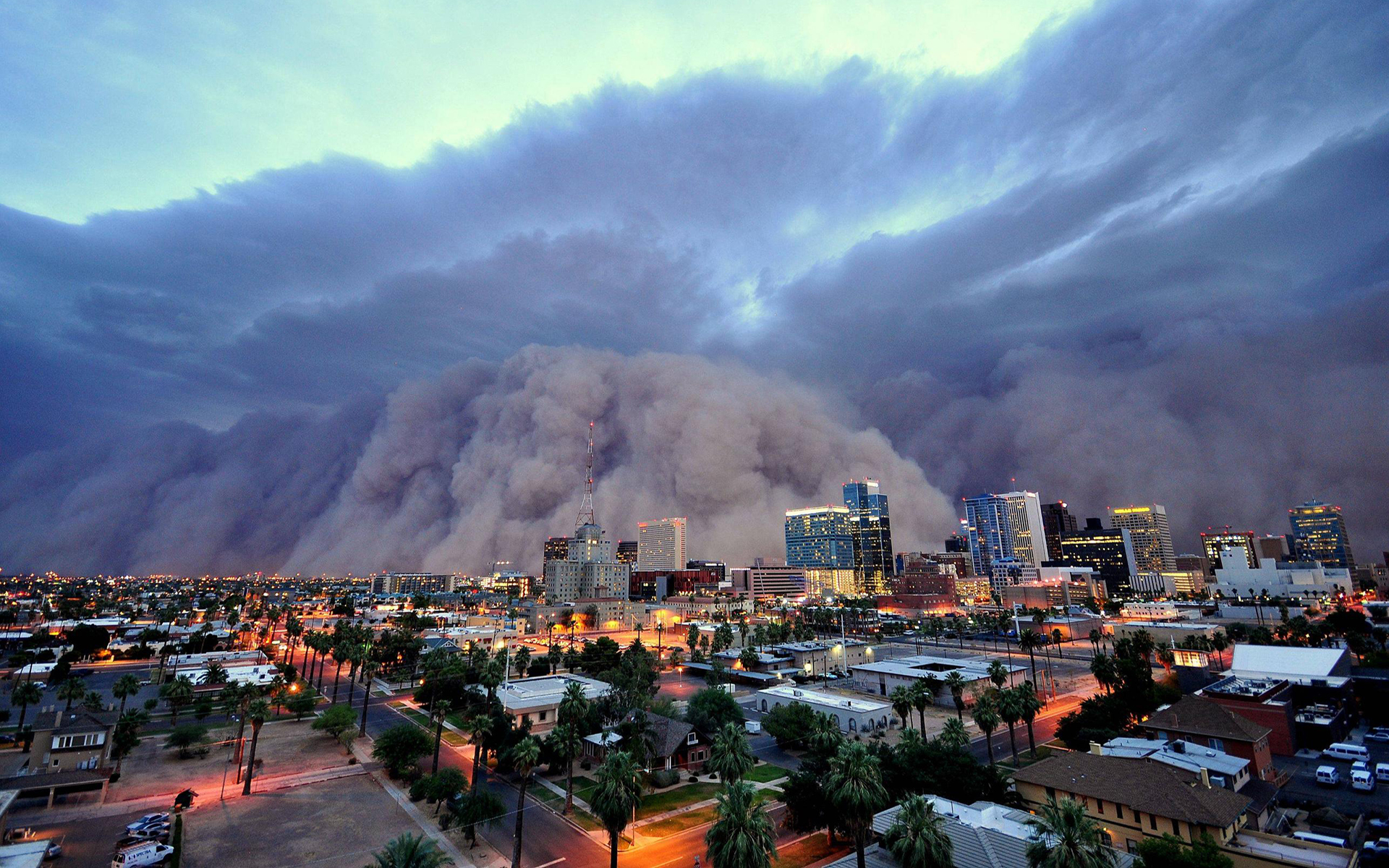
Dust storm over, Phoenix, Arizona

According to the EPA "Climate change threatens natural resources and public health of tribal communities. Rising temperatures and increasing droughts are likely to decrease the availability of certain fish, hunt, and wild plants on which the Navajo and other tribes have relied for generations. Water may be less available for domestic consumption, especially for those who are not served by either municipal systems or reliable wells, which includes about 30 percent of the people on the Navajo Nation, who must haul water to meet daily needs. Recurring drought and rising temperatures may degrade the land itself. In the Navajo Nation, for example, the Great Falls Dune Field has advanced almost a mile in the last 60 years, threatening roads, homes, and grazing areas. Extreme heat may also create health problems for those without electricity, including about 40 percent of the people on the Navajo reservation".

== Adaptation ==
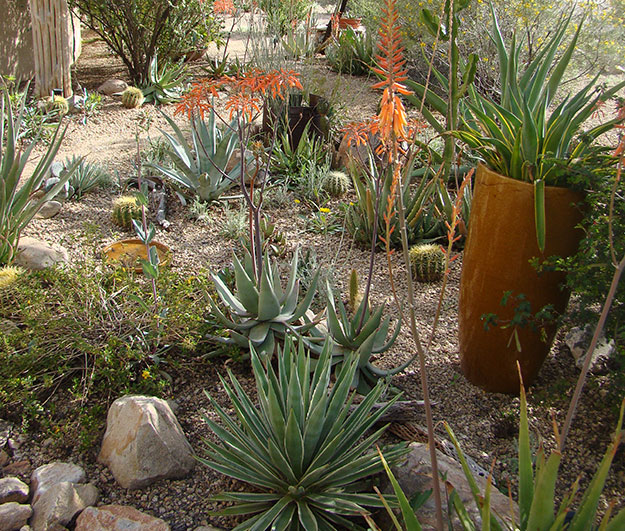
Drought-tolerant landscaping, Scottsdale, Arizona

Phoenix's large population and extremely dry climate make the city particularly vulnerable to the threats of drought and extreme heat. However, the city has recently incorporated climate change into current (and future) water management and urban design. And by doing so, Phoenix has taken steps to ensure sustainable water supplies and to protect populations that are vulnerable to extreme heat, largely through improving the sustainability and efficiency of communal infrastructure.

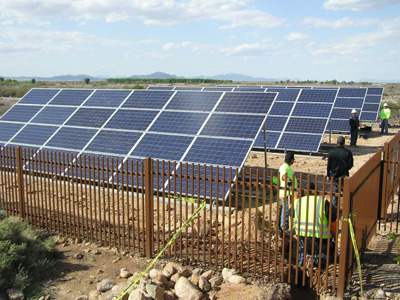
Solar panels at the Southwest Arizona National Wildlife Refuge Complex

For example, Phoenix uses renewable surface water supplies and reserves groundwater for use during the instance when extended droughts arise. The city is also creating a task force to redesign the downtown core to minimize the way buildings trap heat and increase local temperatures.

Phoenix was rated as the city that could benefit the most from passive daytime radiative cooling (PDRC) applications, which are high in solar reflectance and thermal emittance, in the United States. The city could achieve energy consumption savings of ~2500 kWh. Arizona State University partnered with 3M to install PDRC films on local Tempe bus shelters as a pilot program. The film lowered bus shelter temperatures by approximately 4°C. Implementation has also been considered in Phoenix.

== See also ==
- List of U.S. states and territories by carbon dioxide emissions
- Plug-in electric vehicles in Arizona
