= Insurance regulatory law =

Insurance regulatory law is part of insurance law that covers statutory law, administrative regulations and jurisprudence that regulates the insurance industry and those engaged in the business of insurance. Insurance regulatory law is primarily enforced through regulations, rules and directives by national or state insurance agencies or departments as authorized and directed by statutory law enacted by each countries legislatures. In the United States this is primarily done through state legislation, however, federal law, court decisions and administrative adjudications also play an important role.

The business of insurance, although primarily a matter of private contract, is nevertheless of such concern for the public interest it tends to be subject to governmental regulation to protect the public’s interests in most countries. The fundamental purpose of insurance regulatory law is to protect the public as insurance consumers and policyholders.

== History (United States) ==
=== State-based insurance regulation ===
Historically, the insurance industry has been regulated almost exclusively by the individual state governments. The first state commissioner of insurance was appointed in New Hampshire in 1851 and the state-based insurance regulatory system grew as quickly as the insurance industry itself. Prior to this period, insurance was primarily regulated by corporate charter, state statutory law and de facto regulation by the courts in judicial decisions. States coordinate through a nonprofit trade association of state regulatory agencies called the National Association of Insurance Commissioners, which proposes model laws which may be adopted by the members.

As the various state governments each developed its own set of insurance regulations, insurance companies with multi-state business were hampered by the inconsistency of the dissimilar rules and requirements, as well as localism by the state regulators. These companies and their stakeholders joined a growing movement for federal insurance regulation – but, considering the lack of any significant federal regulatory framework, this movement may have been more about avoiding regulation rather than actually promoting federal superiority.

In 1869, the United States Supreme Court cemented state-based insurance regulation as the law of the land when it ruled in Paul v. Virginia that the issuance of a policy of insurance was not the transaction of commerce, and therefore beyond the scope of federal legislation.

More than 70 years, later, however, the Supreme Court overturned that decision in United States v. South-Eastern Underwriters Association, holding that insurance was subject to certain federal legislation such as the federal antitrust statute. Although the South-Eastern case focused primarily on the application of federal anti-trust legislation (the Sherman Act) to the insurance industry, some thought the decision opened the floodgates to widespread federal regulation of the insurance industry and signaled the demise of the state-based insurance regulatory system.

The United States Congress responded almost immediately: in 1945, Congress passed the McCarran-Ferguson Act. The McCarran-Ferguson Act specifically provides that the regulation of the business of insurance by the state governments is in the public interest. Further, the Act states that no federal law should be construed to invalidate, impair or supersede any law enacted by any state government for the purpose of regulating the business of insurance, unless the federal law specifically relates to the business of insurance.

After the McCarran-Ferguson Act, the business of insurance remained substantially regulated by state statutory and administrative laws through the years. Additionally, efforts such as the accreditation standards of the National Association of Insurance Commissioners, and other cooperative endeavors, have increased the uniformity of insurance regulation across the various states.

==== Model laws ====
In 1972, the model law Unfair Claims Settlement Act was written, which has since been adopted by most states with various modifications.

=== Expanding federal influence ===
Despite the long history of state-based insurance regulation, federal regulatory influence has been expanding in the past several decades.

Early federal laws passed included the National Flood Insurance Act of 1968, and a Federal Crime Insurance Program was implemented which the Government Accountability Office recommended terminating in 1982.

In the mid 1970s, for example, the concept of an optional federal charter for insurance companies was raised in Congress. With a wave of solvency and capacity issues facing property and casualty insurers, the proposal was to establish an elective federal regulatory scheme that insurers could opt into from the traditional state system, somewhat analogous to the dual-charter regulation of banks. Although the optional federal chartering proposal was defeated in the 1970s, it became the precursor for a modern debate over optional federal chartering in the last decade.

In the 1980s, the ability to form risk retention groups which were exempt from state regulation was expanded.

From 1986 to 1992, there were 276 insurer bankruptcies. In response to the disruption, the National Association of Insurance Commissioners (“NAIC”) adopted several model reforms for state insurance regulation, including risk-based capital requirements, financial regulation accreditation standards, guaranty associations and an initiative to codify accounting principles into the modern Statutory Accounting Principles. There was renewed discussion of federal insurance regulation, including new legislation for a dual state and federal system of insurance solvency regulation. However, as more and more states enacted versions of these model reforms into law, the pressure for federal reform of insurance regulation waned.

In 1999, Congress passed the Gramm-Leach-Bliley Financial Modernization Act, which sets out certain minimum standards that state insurance laws and regulations were required to meet or else face preemption by federal law.

Over the past decade, renewed calls for optional federal regulation of insurance companies have sounded, including the proposed National Insurance Act of 2006.

The most recent challenges to the state insurance regulatory system are arguably the most significant, as well, showing further erosion of state primacy. Both the Patient Protection and Affordable Care Act (“PPACA”) and the Dodd-Frank Wall Street Reform and Consumer Protection Act (“Dodd-Frank”) are material forays of federal law into the insurance industry.

== Functions ==
Insurance regulation law typically includes:

- Licensing and regulating insurance companies and others involved in the insurance industry;
- Monitoring and preserving the financial solvency of insurance companies;
- Regulating and standardizing insurance policies and products;
- Controlling market conduct and preventing unfair trade practices; and
- Regulating other aspects of the insurance industry.

== Practice ==
The practice of insurance regulatory law requires knowledge and understanding of administrative law, general business and corporate law, contract law, trends and jurisprudence in insurance litigation, legislative developments and a variety of other topics and areas of law. An insurance regulatory attorney provides legal services and practical business solutions on a wide variety of administrative, corporate, insurance, transactional and regulatory issues.

The practice of insurance regulatory law involves providing legal services and counseling on a wide variety of administrative, corporate, insurance, transactional and regulatory issues such as the following:

- The formation, acquisition, sale, merger, restructuring, reorganization and dissolution of insurance companies, their affiliates and other businesses in the insurance industry;
- Negotiating, structuring and executing associated transactions, such as the purchase or sale of blocks of insurance business, or providing compliance services relative to public and private financing;
- Drafting and submitting National Association of Insurance Commissioners (NAIC) Uniform Certificate of Authority Applications (UCAA) and related documentation with respect to insurance company formation, admission, licensing, expansion, re-domestication and other transactions;
- Drafting and submitting other required applications and related documentation with respect to the formation, admission, licensing, expansion, redomestication and other transactions of insurance affiliates, holding companies and other businesses in the insurance industry;
- Representing insurance industry clients before state insurance regulatory and other government agencies with respect to compliance issues, complaint resolution, administrative hearings and other administrative processes;
- Creating, drafting, developing, submitting for regulatory approval, negotiating, revising, supplementing and withdrawing various types of insurance products, policies, contracts, forms, rates, fees, schedules and other regulatory filings, including compliance programs required under state and federal law; and
- Providing general advice and counsel to the officers, directors and management of companies in the insurance industry with respect to issues from day-to-day insurance operations up to board and shareholder/member level matters.

== Market conduct ==
Insurance regulators generally perform "market conduct exams" to determine that insurers are operating in the best interests of consumers. However, these investigations depend on the state, with some states performing them regularly and others performing them in reaction to a noticeable pattern. The exams can take years and are usually paid for by the insurance companies.

In 2018, the majority of states began to require health insurers to submit market conduct data.

== Rate regulation ==
Historically, and continuing to modern day in many states, regulators practice strict price control called "rate regulation" and can deny or approve any rate change. The statute typically states that rates shall not be inadequate or excessive, as inadequate rates increase the risk of bankruptcy and excessive rates are regarded as unfair. A similar statute may prohibits "unfair discrimination" in rates, which is intended to prohibit discrimination which is not based upon a difference in risk.

=== Rebating ===
Although rebating, which involves giving back some of the purchase price (or offering some sort of per customer discount) is common in some industries, as of 2009, 48 states and D.C. prohibited it in insurance by adopting a law based upon the NAIC Model Unfair Trade Practices.

== Solvency regulation ==
After the 2008 financial crisis, a model law called the Standard Valuation Model Law was revised to adopt a "principles-based" approach to life insurance reserving, which was adopted by a number of states.

== See also ==
General insurance topics:

- Insurance
- Insurance law
- History of insurance

US insurance topics:

- Insurance in the United States
- National Association of Insurance Commissioners
- Insurance Regulatory Information System

Insurance in other countries:

- Insurance in the United Kingdom
- Insurance in Australia
- Insurance in India
- Insurance Regulatory and Development Authority
- China Insurance Regulatory Commission
