= Risk retention group =

Member-owned US liability insurance group formed under the Liability Risk Retention Act

A risk retention group (RRG) in business economics is an alternative risk transfer entity in the United States created under the federal Liability Risk Retention Act (LRRA). RRGs must form as liability insurance companies under the laws of at least one state—its charter state or domicile. The policyholders of the RRG are also its owners and membership must be limited to organizations or persons engaged in similar businesses or activities, thus being exposed to the same types of liability.

A risk retention group is a corporation or limited liability association formed under the laws of any state for the primary purpose of assuming liability exposures on behalf of its members. Members of the group must be engaged in similar activities or related with respect to liability exposures by virtue of any related or common business exposure, trade, product, service, or premise. Members must have an ownership interest in the group and only members may benefit from the group. Risk retention groups only apply to liability loss exposures.

RRGs provide their members with the following benefits:

- Program control
- Long-term rate stability
- Customized Loss control and risk management practices
- Dividends for good loss experience
- Access to reinsurance markets
- Stable source of liability coverage at affordable rates
- Multi-state operations

== History ==
Under the McCarran-Ferguson Act, most insurance matters are regulated at the state, rather than federal, level. However, in the late 1970s, Congress faced an unprecedented crisis in insurance markets, during which many businesses were unable to obtain product liability coverage at any cost.

Congress was forced to take action, and, after several years of study, enacted the Product Liability Risk Retention Act of 1981, which permitted individuals or businesses with similar or related liability exposure to form "risk retention groups" for the purpose of self-insuring. The Act only applied to product liability and completed operations insurance.

When companies faced similar issues obtaining other types of liability insurance in the 1980s, Congress enacted the Liability Risk Retention Act of 1986 (LRRA), which extended the Act to all types of commercial liability insurance. Under the LRRA, a domiciliary state is charged with regulating the formation and operation of a risk retention group.

The LRRA pre-empts "any State law, rule regulation, or order to the extent that such law, rule, regulation or order would make unlawful, or regulate, directly or indirectly, the operation of a risk retention group." The LRRA also prohibits states from enacting regulations that discriminate against risk retention groups.

However, not all non-domiciliary state regulation of an RRG is prohibited under the LRRA. RRGs must pay state premium taxes, comply with state unfair claim settlement practices statutes and register with and designate the state insurance commissioner as its agent for service of process. A state insurance commissioner can perform an examination of an RRG if the RRG's domicile state has not performed, or refuses to perform, such an examination. However, the bulk of regulation of an RRG is left to the state which licensed it.

In response to the act, 44 RRGs were formed by the end of 1987. Many of the RRGs formed during this time were domiciled in Vermont, one of the leading captive domiciles in the world. Vermont already had a fully developed captive program by the time the LRRA was passed and could offer assistance in setting up RRGs in a way that other states were unprepared to do.

During the mid-1990s the insurance market softened, so, in many cases, it was cheaper to purchase liability insurance through traditional insurance carriers. While many RRGs were formed during the decade, many more ceased operating. In the year 2000, the number of RRGs had only grown to 65 in the 14 years since the passage of the Act.

After September 11, the insurance market hardened. This led to a period of rapid growth for risk retention groups. Between 2000 and 2008 the number of RRGs quadrupled to reach 262. Besides the hard insurance market, a number of other factors led to such rapid growth in the industry. Captive insurance really came into its own during the early 2000s with more and more states enacting captive laws and seeking alternative risk transfer vehicles as a steady source of revenue. Many states, including the District of Columbia and Montana, began to develop their captive programs, creating captive departments, and courting potential groups.

Another factor that helped spur RRG growth was the increasing challenge for doctors and hospitals in the Northeast to obtain medical malpractice insurance, especially in such states as Pennsylvania and New York. RRGs in the healthcare sector expanded by nearly six times during the decade. The number of groups in this sector, always the leading sector for risk retention groups, grew from 26 to 159 between 2000 and December 2012.

As of 2014, RRGs offer liability insurance coverages to a wide variety of insureds/policyholders. Besides hospitals and physicians, the healthcare sector provides liability insurance to nursing homes, dental practices, and HMOs. There are RRGs for educational institutions, for churches, and for non-profit groups. There are RRGs for agricultural concerns, national associations and state lobbyists. Every year, RRGs are emerging in new business niches responding to the need for affordable and available liability insurance.

== State regulation ==
Several states actively seek to license RRGs. Vermont is top among these, having already established its captive department by the time the LRRA was passed. Early on, many states licensed RRGs, but only a handful of states have continued to do so. In the past few years, the District of Columbia has been licensing more and more RRGs. Also seeking to license RRGs are Montana, Arizona, South Carolina, Hawaii and Nevada.

While many states are actively building their RRG roster, some states view RRGs with suspicion. Typically, these are larger states such as New York and California that have few, if any, licensed RRGs and express distrust for RRGs operating in their states. This distrust stems from the pre-emption provision in the LRRA which prevents state insurance departments regulating non-domiciled RRGs that are conducting business in their state.

At the heart of the LRRA is single state regulation of risk retention groups. Pursuant to this unique feature of the Act, the insurance department of one state, which is selected by the RRG, licenses the RRG under its laws and maintains primary regulatory oversight of the group. Once licensed in one state, the RRG can operate in all states without the need to be "admitted" or "qualified as a surplus lines carrier" in the other states as is required of other types of liability insurers.

In its 1989 Operations Report to Congress, the Department of Commerce (DOC) found that although RRGs find the single-state regulatory structure necessary, state insurance regulators wonder whether it pre-empts too much authority, leaving states insufficient authority to adequately regulate RRGs. The National Association of Insurance Commissioners (NAIC) expressed concern that the LRRA resulted in a "hazardous regulatory void." This was echoed by the New York Insurance Department's concern that Congress has "left behind an inadequate scheme of state regulation."

The DOC observed that the "main concern of regulators lies with their reluctance to accept and rely on the licensing requirements and regulatory actions of states other than their own." The DOC report noted that discussions with regulators about the operation of the Act "usually evoke the concern that there are certain states which they consider weak, i.e. where it is easy for a company to get licensed and regulatory oversight is lax."

This "weak-link" fear carries over to the present day, with the 2005 Government Accountability Office (GAO) report on RRGs stating that: "Some (non-domiciliary) regulators...expressed concerns that domiciliary states were lowering their regulatory standards to attract RRGs to domicile in their states for economic development purposes. They sometimes referred to these practices as the ‘regulatory race to the bottom.’"

The DOC report from 1989 pointed out that, "Uneven state regulatory standards and oversight were not created by the LRRA, but the Act—because of its emphasis on single-state regulation and the necessity for regulators to rely on each other’s regulatory attentiveness—has highlighted the situation."

At about the time the DOC published its report, the Dingell Report, the product of an 18-month Congressional investigation and hearings held during 1988 and 1989 on causes of insurer insolvencies, was released. The report concluded that insolvency problems were primarily caused by fraud, mismanagement, and weak state regulation. The report's general prescription was for more comprehensive and competent regulation, warning that if such oversight were not forthcoming by the states, that the federal government would be compelled to fill the void.

Following these reports in the late 1980s, the NAIC, faced with the threat of a federal regulatory system replacing the state system of regulation, announced its adoption of uniform financial regulatory standards to meet the need for a stronger regulatory system.

Despite the NAIC's attempt at standardizing state insurance regulation, each state has its own licensing requirements for RRGs, and imposes its own fees and taxes.

== Current issues ==
Since the LRRA was passed there have been several attempts to amend the act, but nothing has ever come of any of these attempts. The most recent attempt was made in March, 2011 when the Risk Retention Modernization Act (HR 2126) was introduced into Congress. While the bill never made it to the Congressional floor, supporters have plans to reintroduce the bill during the next Congressional session. The Risk Retention Modernization Act (RRMA) includes three specific elements—the addition of property coverage; improved corporate governance standards, and the establishment of a federal mediator. Supporters of the LRRA favor property coverage. If RRMA is passed, RRGs would be allowed to write property coverages along with liability, important for RRGs which insure institutions like schools, churches, and hospitals.

The second element of the proposed Act is to implement improved corporate governance demands that were first suggest in 2005 in the GAO's report on RRGs and later taken up by the NAIC. While many of the new requirements could be burdensome to RRGs, many in the industry feel that the strengthened regulations can only help to legitimize RRGs.

The third element in the RRMA could prove to be the most beneficial to RRGs. The Act would establish a federal mediator, within the Federal Insurance Office (FIO), that would be in charge of settling disputes between states and RRGs. Right now, when a non-domiciliary state bars an RRG from writing a certain type of business or tries to regulate an RRG as a domiciled RRG, the RRG's only recourse is to take the dispute to court which can prove costly for a company to pursue. With a federal mediator to interpret the LRRA and any amendments, an RRG will have a much stronger position in the states where it conducts business.

In late July 2010, the Congressional House Financial Services Oversight & Investigation Subcommittee submitted a letter to the GAO to conduct a study into states over-reaching the regulation of RRGs. A report was issued on January 9, 2012, titled "Risk Retention Groups: Clarifications Could Facilitate States’ Implementation of the Liability Risk Retention Act." The report recommended that Congress should pass legislation clarifying registration, tax and fee requirements imposed by states on RRGs, as well as providing specific definitions of the type of insurance coverages that should be permitted under the LRRA.

== Associations and publications ==
The RRG marketplace is served by the National Risk Retention Association (NRRA). The association was formed within a year of the passage of the LRRA and has been a voice for RRGs since 1987. NRRA operates as an advocate for risk retention groups and purchasing groups and has a long history of successful legal and regulatory representation of the interests of risk retention and purchasing group liability insurance programs. NRRA holds an annual meeting in the fall with programs specifically oriented to those involved in the industry.

RRGs are often grouped with captive and other self-insured entities and, therefore, have their interests represented by state captive associations, such as the Vermont Captive Insurance Association, and other captive associations, such as the Captive Insurance Company Association.

The Risk Retention Reporter (RRR) is a monthly journal that monitors the RRG and PG marketplace. Founded in April 1987, the RRR is the only information source devoted to this niche sector of the insurance industry. The RRR also produces an annual book, the Risk Retention Group Directory & Guide, which offers details for every operating RRG and analytic and financial information on RRGs.

== Reception ==
=== Advantages ===
- Avoidance of multiple state filing and licensing requirements
- Member control over risk and litigation management issues
- Establishment of stable market for coverage and rates
- Elimination of market residuals
- Exemption from countersignature laws for agents and brokers
- No expense for fronting fees
- Unbundling of services

=== Disadvantages ===
- Risks are limited to liability insurance
- Not permitted to write risks outside its homogeneous group
- No guaranty fund coverage for members
- May not be able to comply with proof of financial responsibility laws
- Can be without a financial rating from a rating agency

== See also ==
- Insurance regulatory law
- Outline of finance, Insurance
- Risk financing
- Risk management
