= Insurance in the United States =

Market for risk in the United States

Insurance in the United States refers to the market for risk in the United States, the world's largest insurance market by premium volume. According to Swiss Re, of the $7.186 trillion of global direct premiums written worldwide in 2023, $3.226 trillion (44.9%) were written in the United States.

Insurance, generally, is a contract in which the insurer agrees to compensate or indemnify another party (the insured, the policyholder or a beneficiary) for specified loss or damage to a specified thing (e.g., an item, property or life) from certain perils or risks in exchange for a fee (the insurance premium). For example, a property insurance company may agree to bear the risk that a particular piece of property (e.g., a car or a house) may suffer a specific type or types of damage or loss during a certain period of time in exchange for a fee from the policyholder who would otherwise be responsible for that damage or loss. That agreement takes the form of an insurance policy.

Insurance provides indemnification against loss or liability from specified events and circumstances that may occur or be discovered during a specified period.

— FASB Statement of Financial Accounting Standards No. 113, "Accounting for Reinsurance of Short-Duration and Long-Duration Contracts" December 1992

== History ==
The first insurance company in the United States underwrote fire insurance and was formed in Charleston, South Carolina, in 1735. In 1752, Benjamin Franklin helped form a mutual insurance company called the Philadelphia Contributionship, which is the nation's oldest insurance carrier still in operation.

The first stock insurance company formed in the United States was the Insurance Company of North America in 1792. Massachusetts enacted the first state law requiring insurance companies to maintain adequate reserves in 1837. Formal regulation of the insurance industry began in earnest when the first state commissioner of insurance was appointed in New Hampshire in 1851. In 1859, the State of New York appointed its own commissioner of insurance and created a state insurance department to move towards more comprehensive regulation of insurance at the state level.

Insurance and the insurance industry has grown, diversified and developed significantly ever since. Insurance companies were, in large part, prohibited from writing more than one line of insurance until laws began to permit multi-line charters in the 1950s. From an industry dominated by small, local, single-line mutual companies and member societies, the business of insurance has grown increasingly towards multi-line, multi-state and even multi-national insurance conglomerates and holding companies.

== Regulation ==
=== State-based insurance regulatory system ===
Historically, the insurance industry in the United States was regulated almost exclusively by individual state governments. The first state commissioner of insurance was appointed in New Hampshire in 1851 and the state-based insurance regulatory system grew as quickly as the insurance industry itself. Prior to this period, insurance was primarily regulated by corporate charter, state statutory law and de facto regulation by the courts in judicial decisions.

Under the state-based insurance regulation system, each state operates independently to regulate their own insurance markets, typically through a state department of insurance or division of insurance. Stretching back as far as the Paul v. Virginia case in 1869, challenges to the state-based insurance regulatory system have risen from various groups, both within and without the insurance industry. The state regulatory system has been described as cumbersome, redundant, confusing and costly.

The United States Supreme Court found in the 1944 case of United States v. South-Eastern Underwriters Association that the business of insurance was subject to federal regulation under the Commerce Clause of the U.S. Constitution. The United States Congress, however, responded almost immediately with the McCarran–Ferguson Act in 1945. The McCarran-Ferguson Act specifically provides that the regulation of the business of insurance by the state governments is in the public interest. Further, the Act states that no federal law should be construed to invalidate, impair or supersede any law enacted by any state government for the purpose of regulating the business of insurance, unless the federal law specifically relates to the business of insurance.

A wave of insurance company insolvencies in the 1980s sparked a renewed interest in federal insurance regulation, including new legislation for a dual state and federal system of insurance solvency regulation. In response, the National Association of Insurance Commissioners (NAIC) adopted several model reforms for state insurance regulation, including risk-based capital requirements, financial regulation accreditation standards and an initiative to codify accounting principles. As more and more states enacted versions of these model reforms into law, the pressure for federal reform of insurance regulation waned. However, there are still significant differences between states in their systems of insurance regulation, and the cost of compliance with those systems is ultimately borne by insureds in the form of higher premiums. McKinsey & Company estimated in 2009 that the U.S. insurance industry incurs about $13 billion annually in unnecessary regulatory costs under the state-based regulatory system.

The NAIC acts as a forum for the creation of model laws and regulations. Each state decides whether to pass each NAIC model law or regulation, and each state may make changes in the enactment process, but the models are widely, albeit somewhat irregularly, adopted. The NAIC also acts at the national level to advance laws and policies supported by state insurance regulators. NAIC model acts and regulations provide some degree of uniformity between states, but these models do not have the force of law and have no effect unless they are adopted by a state. They are, however, used as guides by most states, and some states adopt them with little or no change.

There is a long-running debate within and among states over the importance of government regulation of insurance which is noticeable in the different titles of their state insurance regulatory agencies. In many states, insurance is regulated through a cabinet-level "department" because of its economic importance. In other states, insurance is regulated through a "division" of a larger department of business regulation or financial services, on the grounds that elevating too many government agencies to departments leads to administrative chaos and the better option is to maintain a clear chain of command.

=== Federal regulation of insurance ===
Nevertheless, federal regulation has continued to encroach upon the state regulatory system. The idea of an optional federal charter was first raised after a spate of solvency and capacity issues plagued property and casualty insurers in the 1970s. This OFC concept was to establish an elective federal regulatory scheme that insurers could opt into from the traditional state system, somewhat analogous to the dual-charter regulation of banks. Although the optional federal chartering proposal was defeated in the 1970s, it became the precursor for a modern debate over optional federal chartering in the last decade.

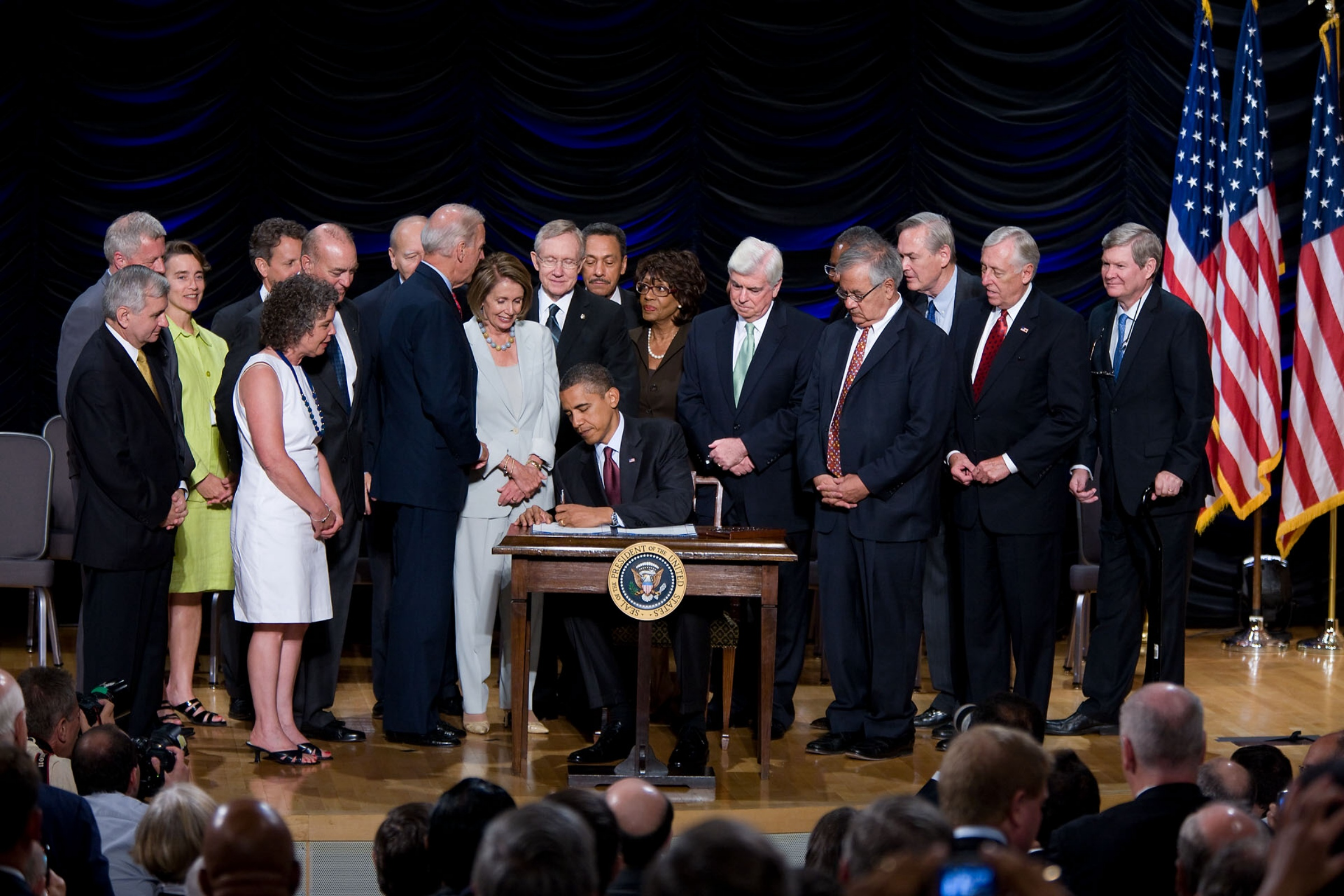
President Obama signing Dodd–Frank Reform Act into law

In 1979 and the early 1980s the Federal Trade Commission attempted to regulate the insurance industry, but the Senate Commerce Committee voted unanimously to prohibit the FTC's efforts. President Jimmy Carter attempted to create an "Office of Insurance Analysis" in the Treasury Department, but the idea was abandoned under industry pressure.

Over the past two decades, renewed calls for optional federal regulation of insurance companies have sounded, including the Gramm-Leach-Bliley Act in 1999, the proposed National Insurance Act in 2006 and the Patient Protection and Affordable Care Act ("Obamacare") in 2010.

In 2010, Congress passed the Dodd–Frank Wall Street Reform and Consumer Protection Act which is touted by some as the most sweeping financial regulation overhaul since the Great Depression. The Dodd–Frank Act has significant implications for the insurance industry. Significantly, Title V of created the Federal Insurance Office (FIO) in the Department of the Treasury. The FIO is authorized to monitor all of the insurance industry and identify any gaps in the state-based regulatory system. The Dodd–Frank Act also establishes the Financial Stability Oversight Council (FSOC), which is charged with monitoring the financial services markets, including the insurance industry, to identify potential risks to the financial stability of the United States.

== Organization ==
=== Admitted v. surplus ===
An important artifact of the state-based insurance regulation system in the United States is the dichotomy between admitted and surplus insurers. Insurers in the U.S. may be "admitted", meaning that they have been formally admitted to a state's insurance market by the state insurance commissioner, and are subject to various state laws governing organization, capitalization, policy forms, rate approvals, and claims handling. Or they may be "surplus", meaning that they are nonadmitted in a particular state but are willing to write coverage there. Surplus line insurers are supposed to underwrite only very unusual or difficult-to-insure risks, to prevent them from undermining each state's ability to regulate its insurance market. Although experienced insurance brokers are well aware of what risks an admitted insurer will not accept, they must document a "diligent effort" at actually shopping around a risk to several admitted insurers (typically three, who will promptly reject it) before applying for coverage with a surplus line insurer.

To relieve insurers and brokers of that tedious and time-consuming chore, many states now maintain "export lists" of risks that the state insurance commissioner has already identified as having no coverage available whatsoever from any admitted insurer in the state. In turn, brokers presented by clients with those risks can immediately "export" them to the out-of-state surplus market and apply directly to surplus line insurers without having to first document multiple attempts to present the risk to admitted insurers. However, many states have refused to establish export lists, including Florida, Illinois, and Texas.

By their very nature, export lists illustrate what U.S. insurers consider to be hard-to-insure risks. For example, the California export list includes ambulance services, amusement parks, blasting, fireworks displays, moving a building, demolition, hay in the open, hot air balloons, medical billing, product recalls, sawmills, scaffolding, security guards, and tattoo shops, as well as particular types of insurance like employment practices liability and kidnap and ransom.

Although surplus line insurers are still regulated by the states (or countries) in which they are actually admitted, the disadvantages of obtaining insurance from a surplus line insurer are that the policy will usually be written on a nonstandard form (that is, not from the Insurance Services Office), and if the insurer collapses, its insureds in states in which it is nonadmitted will not enjoy certain types of protection available to insureds in the states (or countries) in which the insurer is admitted. However, for persons trying to obtain coverage for unusual risks, the choice is usually between a surplus line insurer or no coverage at all.

One long-running issue with the surplus lines concept is that it makes less sense when applied to sophisticated insureds with many risks spread across multiple states. Congress enacted the Nonadmitted and Reinsurance Reform Act of 2010 in an attempt to clarify which state gets to regulate the sale of surplus lines insurance to such insureds, and to exempt certain elite categories of insurance purchasers from the normal requirement of a diligent effort to procure coverage from admitted insurers.

=== Insurance groups ===
Only the smallest insurers exist as a single corporation. Most major insurance companies actually exist as insurance groups. They consist of holding companies which own multiple insurers licensed in various jurisdictions, including in some cases surplus and excess insurers and reinsurance companies. Some insurance groups also include non-risk bearing businesses such as agencies and loss adjusters. There are large variations among insurance groups relating to division of business functions between the parent corporation and its subsidiaries.

An example of how insurance groups work is that when people call GEICO and ask for a rate quote, they are actually connected to GEICO Insurance Agency, which may then write a policy from any one of GEICO's nine insurance companies. When the customer writes their check for the premium to "GEICO", the premium is deposited with one of those nine insurance companies (the one that wrote their policy). Similarly, any claims against the policy are charged to the issuing company. However, as far as most layperson customers are subjectively aware (unless they read their insurance policies carefully), they are simply dealing with GEICO.

Obviously, it is more difficult to operate an insurance group than a single insurance company. Employees must be painstakingly trained to observe corporate formalities so that courts will not treat the entities in the group as alter egos of one another and allow plaintiffs to pierce the corporate veil. For example, all insurance policies and all claim-related documents must consistently reference the relevant company within the group, and the flows of premiums and claim payments must be carefully recorded against the books of the correct company.

Because of the systemic risk of insurance groups, regulators and the National Association of Insurance Commissioners have taken an interest in comprehensive supervision of insurance groups. The GAO issued a study in 2013 that found large insurance groups had weathered the 2008 financial crisis well, but recommended additional regulatory reform and scrutiny of risks associated with non-insurer entities. All major insurance groups in the U.S. that transact insurance in California maintain a publicly accessible list on their Web sites of the actual insurer entities within the group, as required by California Insurance Code Section 702.

The advantage of the insurance group system is that a group has increased survivability over the long run than a single insurance company. If any one company in the group is hit with too many claims and fails, the company can be quietly placed into "runoff" (in which it continues to exist only to process legacy claims and no longer writes new coverage) but the rest of the group continues to operate. This phenomenon is common enough that some groups have split off their legacy liabilities for so-called "long-tail" claims into stand-alone runoff companies, to be managed by outside specialist firms who do nothing but runoff business. Such a "good insurer/bad insurer" strategy has a variety of consequences for both insurers and insureds. On the one hand, it frees up an insurance group's employees to focus on operating its currently profitable subsidiaries. On the other hand, claimants attempting to recover from runoff companies face significant pressure to settle because such companies have no revenue streams from newly written policies and pushing too hard may simply force them into insolvency.

By way of contrast, when small insurers fail, they tend to do so in a rather wild and spectacular fashion, as was often the case during the economic cycles of the 1970s and 1980s. Sometimes the result may be a state-supervised takeover by which a state agency may have to assume part of their residual liabilities.

== Types ==
A common typology of insurance in the United States is to divide the industry into life and health insurers, on the one hand, and property and casualty insurers on the other:

- Life, Health
  - Health (dental, vision, medications, others)
  - Life (long-term care, accidental death and dismemberment, hospital indemnity)
  - Annuities (securities)
  - Life and Annuities
- Property and Casualty (P & C)
  - Property (flood, earthquake, home, auto, fire, boiler, title, pet)
  - Casualty (errors and omissions, workers' compensation, disability, liability)

Reinsurance is usually treated as a separate category from the above types.

== Institutions ==
Various associations, government agencies, and companies serve the insurance industry in the United States. The National Association of Insurance Commissioners (NAIC) provides models for standard state insurance law, and provides services for its members, which are the state insurance departments or divisions. Statistics related to the insurance industry are maintained by publishers such as A.M. Best, American Risk and Insurance Association, National Association of Insurance Commissioners, and the Federal Insurance Office of the U.S. Department of the Treasury. Many insurance providers use the Insurance Services Office (ISO), which produces standard policy forms and rating loss costs and then submits these documents on the behalf of member insurers to the state insurance departments or divisions.

== See also ==
Other U.S. insurance topics:

- California FAIR Plan
- Health insurance in the United States
- Insurance Regulatory Information System
- McCarran–Ferguson Act
- National Association of Insurance Commissioners
- Vehicle insurance in the United States
- Climate change and insurance in the United States
- 1988 California Proposition 103

General insurance topics:

- Travel insurance
- Casualty insurance
- Health insurance
- History of insurance
- Insurance
- Life insurance
