= Pamela Davis =

Pamela Davis is the name of:

- Pamela B. Davis, pediatric pulmonologist specializing in cystic fibrosis research.
- Pamela Ellen Davis, the founder, President, and CEO of the Nonprofits Insurance Alliance Group
- Pamela Meyer Davis, the Illinois hospital executive whose complaints lead to the investigation of Illinois Governor Rod Blagojevich

== See also ==
- Pamela Davies (1924–2009), British consultant paediatrician
