= Nonprofits Insurance Alliance =

- Type: Nonprofit
- Industry: Insurance
- Founded: 1989; 37 years ago
- Headquarters: Santa Cruz, California, United States
- Area served: United States: 32 states and Washington D.C.
- Key people: Pamela Davis, Founder, President and CEO
- Products: Liability and Property Insurance
- Total assets: $982.1 million USD
- Number of employees: 160 (2022)
- Website: insurancefornonprofits.org

Nonprofits Insurance Alliance (NIA) is an American group of cooperative 501(c)(3) nonprofit insurance organizations that provide liability and property insurance exclusively to other 501(c)(3) nonprofit organizations.

== History ==
Pamela Davis, NIA's Founder, President and CEO, was a graduate student at UC Berkeley during the liability insurance crisis of the 1980s, when insurance companies raised their premiums drastically, reduced their coverages, and left some segments of the market, including many nonprofits, completely uncovered. Davis' master's thesis, documented how the insurance crisis was harming nonprofit organizations and in some cases even putting them out of business. In 1987, she testified before the California General Assembly that:

Between 1984 and 1986, general liability insurance premiums increased 200 percent or more for one out of four charitable nonprofit organizations in California. During that same period, insurance companies canceled or refused to renew the general liability policies of one out of five California charitable nonprofits. Some important human service programs, such as childcare, foster care, group homes and health service were forced to dramatically cut services or close because they couldn’t find affordable insurance.

Based on her research, Davis was convinced that conventional insurers did not fully understand insurance risk in the nonprofit sector, so she set out to create a nonprofit risk pool that could better meet the needs of nonprofits in California. In 1989, Davis secured $1.3 million in loans from nonprofit partners and foundations to create the Nonprofits Insurance Alliance of California (NIAC), the first and largest company in NIA.

Over the next decade, NIAC grew to serve thousands of nonprofits, but its operations were limited to the state of California. In order to replicate the NIAC model nationwide, Davis secured $5 million from the Bill & Melinda Gates Foundation and $5 million from the David & Lucile Packard Foundation to found the Alliance of Nonprofits for Insurance, Risk Retention Group (ANI). NIA also publishes the online trade magazine Blue Avocado.

== Companies in the group ==
Nonprofits Insurance Alliance is an insurance cooperative composed of four distinct 501(c)(3) nonprofit organizations:

- Nonprofits Insurance Alliance of California (NIAC): Provides liability and property insurance to nonprofits in California.
- Alliance of Nonprofits for Insurance, Risk Retention Group (ANI): Provides liability insurance to nonprofits with operations outside of California.
- National Alliance of Nonprofits for Insurance (NANI): Initially founded to provide property reinsurance, NANI now provides auto physical damage coverage to ANI members.
- Alliance Member Services (AMS): Provides support to the other companies in the group and their partner programs.
