= Pamela Ellen Davis =

President of NIA

Pamela Davis
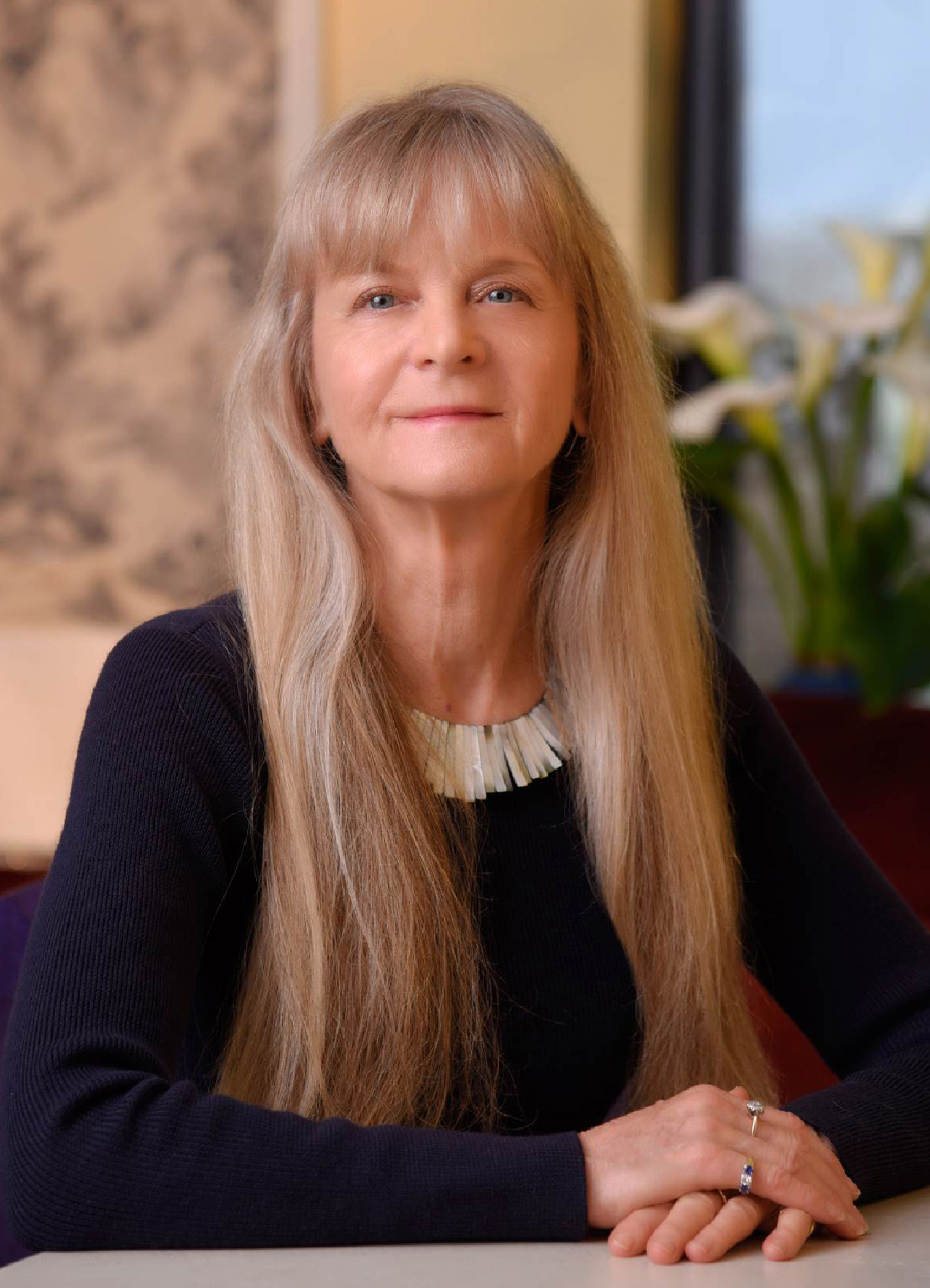
- Born: Pamela Ellen Davis; Mansfield, Ohio
- Title: Founder, President and CEO of Nonprofits Insurance Alliance
- Website: insurancefornonprofits.org

Pamela Ellen Davis is the founder, President and CEO of Nonprofits Insurance Alliance (NIA), a group of 501(c)(3) nonprofit insurance cooperatives that provide liability insurance to more than 25,000 nonprofit organizations in the United States. In addition to her nonprofit insurance work, she is a public policy advocate and nonprofit thought leader who has spearheaded legislative change at both the California state and Federal level and overseen projects to increase nonprofits' access to credit and improve the financial expertise of the nonprofit sector.

== Personal life ==
Davis was born in Mansfield, Ohio and attended Ohio University for a year and a half, before marrying and moving to Oxford, Ohio and then to Harlan County, KY to work for an environmental education school. After three years in Kentucky, she returned to Ohio where she became involved in the natural food movement and opened a health food store and restaurant. At the age of 30, she divorced, sold her restaurant and moved to California, where she went on to earn a bachelor's degree in economics from UC Santa Cruz and a master's degree in public policy from the University of California, Berkeley.

== Leadership in Nonprofit Insurance ==
=== Master's Thesis on the Nonprofit Insurance Crisis ===
In 1987, Davis was a master's degree candidate in Public Policy at University of California, Berkeley. Her master's thesis, supported by the California Community Foundation and the Conrad N. Hilton Foundation, documented the effect of the mid-1980s liability insurance crisis on nonprofit organization's ability to obtain liability insurance. Nonprofits were seeing their premiums rise drastically, and many organizations couldn't obtain coverage from any insurer, leading them to go out of business. In 1987, she testified before the California General Assembly that:

Between 1984 and 1986, general liability insurance premiums increased 200 percent or more for one out of four charitable nonprofit organizations in California. During that same period, insurance companies canceled or refused to renew the general liability policies of one out of five California charitable nonprofits. Some important human service programs, such as childcare, foster care, group homes and health service were forced to dramatically cut services or close because they couldn’t find affordable insurance.

=== Nonprofits Insurance Alliance of California (NIAC) ===
Based on her master's thesis research, Davis was convinced that conventional insurers did not fully understand insurance risk in the nonprofit sector, so she set out to create a nonprofit risk pool that could better meet the needs of nonprofits in California. In 1989, Davis secured $1.3 million in loans from nonprofit partners and foundations to create Nonprofits Insurance Alliance of California (NIAC).

=== Alliance of Nonprofits for Insurance (ANI) ===
Over the next decade, NIAC grew to serve thousands of nonprofits, but its operations were limited to the state of California. In order to replicate the NIAC model nationwide, Davis secured $5 million from the Bill & Melinda Gates Foundation and $5 million from the David & Lucile Packard Foundation to found Alliance of Nonprofits for Insurance, Risk Retention Group (ANI).

NIAC and ANI are the primary insurers forming Nonprofits Insurance Alliance. NIA insures over 25,000 nonprofits in 32 states and the District of Columbia, and controls over $982.1 million in assets.

=== Legislative Initiatives ===
Throughout her career, Pamela Davis has spearheaded multiple efforts to pass legislation strengthening nonprofit self-insurance pools and expanding the services they are allowed to provide:

- 1996: Congress adds Section 501(n) to the tax code enabling charitable risk pools to qualify as a tax-exempt 501(c)(3) organization; NIAC gains 501(c)(3) status.
- 1996: State of California adds Section 23701z to the Tax Code, enabling nonprofit self-insurance pools like NIAC to receive state tax-exemption.
- 2014: California bill SB 1011 allows nonprofit self-insurance pools to provide property insurance of all kinds; prior to this bill, the only property that nonprofit risk pools could only insure were motor vehicles.
- 2016: HR 3794 introduced to Congress as Nonprofit Property Protection Act allowing certain established charitable risk pools to write property insurance.
- 2018: HR 6292 an amended version of HR 3794.
- 2019-2020: HR 4523 Same version as HR 6292. Original cosponsors include Chair of the Housing, Community Development, and Insurance subcommittee, Rep. Wm. Lacy Clay.
- 2024: California bill AB 2496, the Foster Family Agency Accountability Act. The original language of the bill aimed to ensure that California foster family agencies would not be held liable for harm to children caused by other parties that could not have been reasonably foreseen or prevented by foster family agencies, conditions that threatened the insurability of foster family agencies. A modified version was signed into law in September 2024, which Davis claimed was “worse than if the state had done nothing”.

== Leadership in the Nonprofit Sector ==
=== American Nonprofits ===
In 2012, Davis and a group of nonprofit leaders formed American Nonprofits, a nonprofit organization with a two-fold mission. The first is to create a platform for research, dialog, and debate among nonprofit finance professionals and thought leaders on topics related to finance, accountability, capital, and strategy. Davis saw that there were institutions in the nonprofit sector that provided information and support to nonprofits about fundraising, grantmaking, and public policy efforts, but none provided resources relevant to the day-to-day financial operations of most nonprofits.

The second goal of the organization is to create a democratically governed financial institution (a federal credit union) owned by the nonprofit sector to which nonprofits, foundations and individuals can move their deposits, and see their deposits and fees used to support the nonprofit sector. In 2013, Davis and the American Nonprofits board explored the viability of creating a national credit union; they received preliminary field of membership approval from the National Credit Union Administration to serve 501(c)(3) nonprofits, their employees, volunteers and stakeholders, and they created a start-up and 4-year business plan. At the beginning of 2014, Davis announced that, while many parties were interested in the credit union project, American Nonprofits was not able to raise $10.5 million in starting capital at that time, so the credit union was temporarily put on hold. American Nonprofits now exists as an active loan fund for small 501(c)(3) nonprofits.

=== NIAC Member Loan Fund ===
Through feedback from nonprofit customers, Davis became aware that many nonprofits struggled to obtain credit from traditional lenders. Many lenders required personal guarantees or collateral, and many did not offer nonprofits small working capital loans. In order to better understand nonprofits' credit needs and the feasibility of offering small working capital loans, Davis asked her Board of Directors to create the NIAC Member Loan Fund, a pilot program that made 1-year working capital loans of up to $75,000 to NIAC insurance customers. These loans had no personal guarantee or collateral requirements and take less than a month for review and approval. NIAC used data from the loan fund to develop risk models specific to nonprofit borrowers. These models allowed NIAC and other lenders to underwrite these loans more easily and offer them at a larger scale. American Nonprofits grew out of the now-ended pilot program.

=== Thought Leadership ===
As an expert on insurance and nonprofit sector issues, Davis frequently contributes to conferences and publications such as the Social Capital Markets Conference, Insurance Journal, the Nonprofit Times, the Nonprofit Quarterly, the Bill & Melinda Gates Foundation's Markets for Good, Demotech, and Blue Avocado.

In 2014, Davis collaborated with CalNonProfits and CompassPoint to hold the first StrongerTogether Nonprofit Conference. The following year's 2015 StrongerTogether conference in Los Angeles sold-out and featured 20 guest speakers discussing topics such as advocacy, employment, insurance, leadership, management, risk management and strategy.

== Honors and awards ==
The Emmy-nominated documentary series Visionaries profiled Pamela Davis and Nonprofits Insurance Alliance twice, showing the growth of the organization from 1,500 member-insureds in 1997 to NIA's current status as "one of the most successful national nonprofit organizations in America." Other honors and awards include:

- 2000 - Top 100 Women in Insurance - Business Insurance Magazine.
- 2002 - Power & Influence Top 50 - The NonProfit Times.
- 2003 - Best Places to Work
- 2004 - Award for Policy Innovation - Goldman School of Public Policy at the University of California, Berkeley.
- 2005 - 15 Best Bosses - Fortune Small Business and Winning Workplaces.
- 2006 - Women to Watch - Business Insurance Magazine.
- 2008 - Women of Influence - Silicon Valley Business Journal.
- 2013 - Top Workplaces - Bay Area News Group.
- 2017 - Elite Women of 2017 - Insurance Business America.
- 2021 - Power & Influence Top 50 List - The NonProfit Times.
- 2024 - Elite Women of 2024 - Insurance Business America.
