= Agents For Change =

US insurance trade association

Founded in 2005, Agents For Change is a grassroots trade association of over 8,500 insurance agents and brokers from across all lines of insurance working together to enact an optional federal charter to allow producers the option of being regulated at either the federal or state level. Members of Agents for Change participate in policy development and provide lawmakers with expert advice as they move forward to modernize insurance regulation. An optional federal charter could revolutionize the way insurance agents and brokers across America conduct business.

In the 111th Congress a bipartisan bill was introduced in the U.S. House of Representatives to create an optional federal charter. Titled, the National Insurance Consumer Protection Act (H.R. 1880), the bill's sponsors are Representatives Melissa Bean (D-IL) and Ed Royce (R-CA).

There are distinct advantages for agents and brokers within the framework of an optional federal charter. These include: (1) a single national license for agents that offer their services in more than one state; (2) speed to market of products would be greatly enhanced; (3) consumers would have additional products at more competitive rates from which to choose; and (4) the ability to better serve customers no matter where they may live (or move).

Insurers would be able to bring their products to market more quickly because they would only have to obtain approval from a single regulatory body, rather than in multiple states as they do now under the patchwork quilt of state regulation. And consumers, who often move from state to state in today's economy, would benefit from more stable insurance premiums and consistent administration and regulation of their insurance policies.

Consumer protection will be strengthened under a national insurance charter: No longer would consumers be subject to inconsistent regulatory oversight because of where they live. A national regulator would be focused on the issues of greatest importance to consumers including oversight of insurers' financial strength and their sales and claims handling practices. A new Division of Consumer Affairs would be established within the proposed Office of National Insurance (to be housed within the United States Department of the Treasury).

The current patchwork of inconsistent state laws and regulations confuses consumers and results in insurance products that vary greatly among the states. These differences hinder consumers and add to the cost of insurance products. A national insurance charter will eliminate this regulatory inefficiency allowing insurers to offer additional products with enhanced customer service quite possibly at more competitive prices.

== History ==
The McCarran–Ferguson Act, 15 U.S.C. §§ 1011–1015, is a United States federal law that exempts the business of insurance from most federal regulation, including federal anti-trust laws to a limited extent. The McCarran–Ferguson Act was passed by Congress in 1945 after the Supreme Court ruled in United States v. South-Eastern Underwriters Association that the federal government could regulate insurance companies under the authority of the Commerce Clause in the U.S. Constitution.
