= Nonadmitted and Reinsurance Reform Act of 2010 =

The Nonadmitted and Reinsurance Reform Act of 2010 is a United States law regulating the sale of insurance in states where the insurer is usually not authorized to sell insurance. It prevents states other than the home state of a U.S. insurance company from imposing regulations or taxes on the sale of nonadmitted insurance.

== Overview ==
On July 21, 2010, President Barack Obama signed into law the federal Dodd-Frank Wall Street Reform and Consumer Protection Act ("Dodd-Frank"), which contains the Nonadmitted and Reinsurance Reform Act of 2010 ("NRRA"). The NRRA applies to nonadmitted insurance, which includes surplus line insurance and directly-procured insurance, and to reinsurance.

The NRRA took effect on July 21, 2011 and generally provides that the placement of nonadmitted insurance will be regulated by an insured's home state, and that no other state may require a surplus lines broker to be licensed to sell, solicit, or negotiate nonadmitted insurance with respect to the insured. The NRRA preempts state laws with respect to nonadmitted insurance, but does not affect regulation of insurance offered by insurers licensed or authorized in a state.

== Key Concepts ==
=== Nonadmitted Insurance ===
The NRRA defines "nonadmitted insurance" as "any property and casualty insurance permitted to be placed directly or through a surplus lines broker with a nonadmitted insurer eligible to accept such insurance." A nonadmitted insurer is an insurer not licensed or authorized to engage in the business of insurance in a state. The NRRA does not define "property and casualty insurance" and does not apply to workers' compensation insurance, excess insurance for self-funded workers' compensation plans with a nonadmitted insurer, or risk retention groups.;

Nonadmitted insurance includes three major categories: surplus lines insurance, directly-procured insurance, and reinsurance.

==== Surplus lines insurance ====
Surplus lines insurance is insurance—typically by an unadmitted, out-of-state insurer—for risks deemed too great for full insurance by more traditional insurers. A person buying surplus lines insurance does so as a supplement to whatever limited insurance coverage for that risk is available from standard insurers, and typically must go through a state-regulated insurance broker/agent to buy it.

==== Directly-procured insurance ====
Directly-procured insurance is insurance that a person buying insurance purchases directly from an insurer rather than through an insurance broker.

==== Reinsurance ====
Reinsurance is insurance that an insurance company purchases from another insurance company to partly insulate itself from the risk of a major claims event. With reinsurance, the company passes on some part of its own insurance liabilities to the other insurance company so that if a major client makes a large claim the company will be able to meet its payment obligations and still remain in business.

=== Home State ===
The NRRA defines "home state" as: (1) the state in which an insured maintains its principal place of business or, in the case of an individual, the individual's principal residence; or (2) if 100% of the insured risk is located out of the state, the state to which the greatest percentage of the insured's taxable premium for that insurance contract is allocated. If more than one insured from an affiliated group are named insureds on a single nonadmitted insurance contract, the term "home state" means the home state, as determined pursuant to the foregoing, of the member of the affiliated group that has the largest percentage of premium attributable to it under the insurance contract. The NRRA defines "state" as any state of the United States, the District of Columbia, the Commonwealth of Puerto Rico, Guam, the Northern Mariana Islands, the Virgin Islands, and American Samoa.

=== Other concepts not addressed ===
The NRRA does not define "principal place of business", "principal residence", provide for a circumstance when the insured's principal place of business or principal residence is located outside of the United States, or address how the insured's home state is determined when there is a group insurance policy.

It was Congress' intent that each state adopt nationwide uniform requirements, forms, and procedures that provide for the reporting, payment, collection, and allocation of premium taxes for nonadmitted insurance.

== Early Implementation Efforts ==
In the early years after NRRA's passage, there were two competing compacts or agreements: the Surplus Lines Multistate Compliance Compact ("SLIMPACT") and the Nonadmitted Insurance Multi-State Agreement ("NIMA").

=== SLIMPACT ===
SLIMPACT was proposed as a method of implementing the NRRA. SLIMPACT was drafted with input from over 60 insurance professionals representing various state regulators, tax officials, legislators, stamping officers, surplus lines brokers, and trade associations. The National Conference of Insurance Legislators ("NCOIL") initially supported and spearheaded the SLIMPACT concept.

SLIMPACT would have established a commission that has the power, among other things, to adopt mandatory rules and operating procedures that are binding on the compacting states, such as rules regarding uniform eligibility requirements for foreign insurers to be able to place nonadmitted insurance in a state (i.e., minimum capital and surplus, trust funds, etc.); a uniform policyholder notice; and uniform treatment of purchasing group nonadmitted insurance placements. The commission also would have had the authority to establish and adopt rules regarding tax allocation formulas, as well as to establish an executive committee, operations committee, legislative committee, and advisory committees. The membership of these committees could have included executives and attorneys employed by surplus lines insurers, nonadmitted insurance licensees, law firms, representatives of state insurance departments, and representatives of state stamping offices. SLIMPACT further would have permitted the commission to accept any and all appropriate donations and grants of money (including donations and grants of money from surplus lines insurers and brokers) so long as the commission avoids any appearance of impropriety or conflict of interest.

SLIMPACT would have applied to all kinds of nonadmitted insurance and would not have been limited to property and casualty insurance. SLIMPACT also would have established a uniform definition of "principal place of business", but not "principal residence" as used in the definition of "home state." SLIMPACT did not provide for a situation in which the insured's principal place of business or principal residence is located outside the United States or explain how the insured's home state is to be determined when the policy is a group policy. Nor did SLIMPACT address, with regard to tax collection and allocation, the situation in which there is a multi-state risk and the insurer is an admitted insurer in one or more states.

Nine states have enacted legislation that would enable them to join SLIMPACT: Kentucky, New Mexico, North Dakota, Indiana, Kansas, Vermont, Rhode Island, Alabama, and Tennessee. States such as Florida, California, and New York questioned the constitutionality of a compact that cedes a state legislature's substantive rule-making authority to a commission or any other body.; However, since ten states were required for ratification, the member states eventually opted to dissolve SLIMPACT.

=== NIMA ===
The National Association of Insurance Commissioners ("NAIC") and state regulators drafted a competing agreement called NIMA. NIMA was an agreement, not a compact, and was limited to the reporting, payment, collection, and allocation of premium taxes for nonadmitted insurance. There was no commission – all rule-making continued to reside with the states - and no authority for anyone to establish rules and operating procedures that are binding on participating states.

In addition, NIMA explicitly set forth premium tax allocation schedules and formulas. Under NIMA, each participating state agreed to use a designated clearinghouse to facilitate the payment and distribution of nonadmitted insurance premium taxes. The clearinghouse had ministerial functions with respect to the receipt and distribution of nonadmitted insurance premium taxes on behalf of the participating states in accordance with allocation formulas that had already been agreed upon by the states and are already set forth in NIMA. NIMA did not provide for the establishment of committees, but rather, the clearinghouse (which will be selected by participating states by a competitive bid) was directed by the participating states as to its duties on their behalf. NIMA prohibited the clearinghouse from accepting any gifts or donations.

NIMA generally applied to property and casualty insurance, consistent with the NRRA, but allowed a state to utilize the clearinghouse for non-property and casualty insurance too. NIMA also defined "principal place of business" and "principal residence" for the purpose of the definition of an insured's "home state", and provided that, if the insured's principal place of business or principal residence is located outside the United States, then the insured's home state is the state to which the greatest percentage of the insured's taxable premium for that insurance contract is allocated. NIMA further stated that when the group policyholder pays 100% of the premium from its own funds, the term "home state" means the home state of the group policyholder. When the group policyholder does not pay 100% of the premium from its own funds, the term "home state" means the home state of the group member.

A state could withdraw from NIMA by providing 60 days written notice.

Alaska, Connecticut, Florida, Hawaii, Louisiana, Mississippi, Nevada, Puerto Rico, South Dakota, Utah, and Wyoming initially joined NIMA. At that time, those states represented 21.6% of the surplus lines market (based on 2009 data).

On April 28, 2016, NIMA's board voted to dissolve NIMA.

== Eligibility requirements ==
A state may not impose eligibility requirements on, or otherwise establish eligibility criteria for, nonadmitted insurers domiciled in a United States jurisdiction, except in conformance with sections 5(A)(2) and 5(C)(2)(a) of the NAIC's Non-Admitted Insurance Model Act, unless the state has adopted nationwide uniform requirements, forms, and procedures that include alternative nationwide uniform eligibility requirements. In addition, a state may not prohibit a surplus line broker from placing nonadmitted insurance with, or procuring nonadmitted insurance from, a nonadmitted insurer domiciled outside the United States that is listed on the quarterly listing of alien insurers maintained by the NAIC's International Insurers Department ("IID").

== Exempt Commercial Purchaser ==
A surplus lines broker seeking to procure or place nonadmitted insurance in a state for an exempt commercial purchaser ("ECP") is not required to satisfy any state requirement to a make a due diligence search to determine whether the full amount or type of insurance sought by the ECP may be obtained from admitted insurers if: (1) the broker procuring or placing the insurance has disclosed to the ECP that the insurance may or may not be available from the admitted market, which may provide greater protection with more regulatory oversight; and (2) the ECP has subsequently requested, in writing, that the broker procure or place the insurance with a nonadmitted insurer.

An "exempt commercial purchaser" is defined as any person purchasing commercial insurance that, at the time of placement, meets the following requirements: (A) the person employs or retains a qualified risk manager to negotiate insurance coverage; (B) the person has paid aggregate nationwide commercial property and casualty insurance premiums in excess of $100,000 in the immediately preceding 12 months; and(C)(i) the person meets at least 1 of the following criteria: (I) The person possesses a net worth in excess of $20,000,000, as such amount is adjusted pursuant to clause (ii); (II) the person generates annual revenues in excess of $50,000,000, as such amount is adjusted pursuant to clause (ii); (III) the person employs more than 500 full-time or full-time equivalent employees per individual insured or is a member of an affiliated group employing more than 1,000 employees in the aggregate; (IV) the person is a not-for-profit organization or public entity generating annual budgeted expenditures of at least $30,000,000, as such amount is adjusted pursuant to clause (ii); or (V) the person is a municipality with a population in excess of 50,000 persons.

15 U.S.C. § 8206(13) defines "qualified risk manager." Clause (ii) in the definition of "exempt commercial purchaser" requires the amounts set forth in (C) to be adjusted annually to reflect the percentage change in the five-year period in the Consumer Price Index for All Urban Consumers published by the United States Department of Labor's Bureau of Labor Statistics.

== Reinsurance ==
The NRRA provides that if the ceding insurer's state of domicile is an NAIC-accredited state, or has financial solvency requirements substantially similar thereto, and the state of domicile recognizes credit for reinsurance, then no other state may deny such credit for reinsurance. In addition, a state that is not the ceding insurer's domiciliary state is preempted to the extent that any of its laws or regulations: restrict or eliminate the rights of ceding and assuming insurers to resolve disputes pursuant to contractual arbitration; require that a certain state's laws govern a reinsurance contract, disputes arising from such contract, or requirements of the contract; attempt to enforce a reinsurance contract on terms different from those set forth in the reinsurance contract; or otherwise apply the laws of the state to reinsurance agreements of ceding insurers not domiciled in the state.

Where a reinsurer's state of domicile is NAIC-accredited or has substantially similar financial requirements, and the state of domicile determines that the reinsurer predominately engages in a reinsurance business and does not regularly sell direct insurance, the domiciliary state is the state solely responsible for regulating the reinsurer's financial solvency. A non-domiciliary state is precluded from requiring the reinsurer to provide any additional financial information other than the information the reinsurer is required to file with the domiciliary state.

== See also ==
- Insurance Regulatory Information System
