= Optional federal charter =

Optional Federal Charter (OFC) is a proposal to streamline and simplify US insurance regulation by allowing insurance companies to choose between a current state-based regulatory system and a single federal regulatory agency. This would mean that insurance companies would be regulated something like banks: they could choose either a state charter or a federal one. The proposed new federal regulatory system would be housed within the United States Department of the Treasury. Treasury Secretary Henry Paulson came out in favor of an Optional Federal Charter on March 31, 2008.

Groups on both sides of the issue have offered numerous arguments for and against the concept. Proponents promise a freer, more open market for insurance that would benefit consumers, increase product innovation, and help the economy. Opponents, on the other hand, believe that a new federal regulator will impose burdensome bureaucratic rules, squelch competition, and needlessly increase federal power.

Larger insurance companies which operate in multiple states favor the proposal, saying it would cut industry-wide costs by billions per year without reducing consumer protections and encourage free-market competition for insurance on the national level. They also say that the current state-run regulatory system makes it more difficult for insurers to bring innovative products to the market, and consumers are the ones who ultimately pay the price for the inefficiencies of the state-run regulatory system through higher prices. Groups that support an OFC include Agents For Change, the American Insurance Association, the United States Chamber of Commerce, and a variety of free-market groups such as the Competitive Enterprise Institute and FreedomWorks. Both the 2007 Bloomberg-Schumer Report and the Financial Services Roundtable's Blue Ribbon Commission on Mega Catastrophes have called on Congress to enact Optional Federal Charter legislation.

Opponents contend that insurers want an OFC because the current federal OFC bills would largely end the state practice of overseeing—and in some cases setting—the particular rates that insurance companies charge. Groups like the Consumer Federation of America argue that this process of government rate setting tends to provide lower prices for consumers. Opponents also argue that the state-based system does a more efficient job responding to local consumer needs and desires.

== Groups in Favor ==
- Agents For Change
- American Consumer Institute
- American Insurance Association
- Competitive Enterprise Institute
- FreedomWorks

== Groups in Opposition ==
- National Association of Insurance Commissioners
- National Conference of Insurance Legislators
- Consumer Federation of America
