= Liability insurance crisis =

1980s American surge in insurance losses and premiums

The liability insurance crisis in the United States of America refers to a volatile economic period during the mid-1980s. During these years, until about 1990, rising insurance premiums and an unavailability of coverage for several types of liability insurance led to a crisis that has been attributed, among others, to the expansion of tort doctrines for insurer liability and the McCarran-Ferguson exemption from antitrust laws.

== Impact ==
During the period from 1984 to 1987, premiums for general liability increased from about $6.5 billion to approximately $19.5 billion. In addition to increases in premium, many insurers took the following measures to limit the number and cost of claims: 1) changed policy coverage from an occurrence to a claims-made basis; 2) expanded exclusions; 3) raised deductibles; and 4) lowered policy limits on a per-claim basis, and 5) introduced the notion of aggregate total exposure.

The resulting crisis adversely affected a diverse range of organizations, including municipalities, social service providers and pharmaceutical, aircraft, sports equipment, and medical device companies. Many organizations in the nonprofit and government sector could no longer offer social, medical or recreational services due to the prohibitive cost or unavailability of liability coverage.

Reaction to the crisis was widespread in the public media. Public policy advocates expressed concern about the impact on human services. In California, for example, testimony was given before the California Assembly regarding the significant loss of human service programs such as foster care, group homes, and health services caused by soaring premiums and widespread policy cancellation.

== Causes ==
Various theories among academics, government, insurers, consumers, and regulators have been put forth regarding the causes of the crisis.

1. Collusion: the argument that the crisis was engineered by insurance companies themselves, through price-fixing and/or manipulation of insurance reserve accounts.
2. Losses: Decrease in interest rates and investment returns forced insurance companies to raise premiums in order to make up for the loss of profitability.
3. Litigation: Proliferation of tort litigation and large settlements drove the cost of liability insurance premiums to excessive levels.
4. Reinsurance: Disruption of supply in reinsurance markets cited as a contributing factor.

== Tort reform and alternative insurance ==
As a result of widespread economic disruption, a large number of states adopted tort reforms to limit the dramatic surge in insurance losses and premiums. Congress enacted legislation that expanded the ability of companies prone to similar risks to join together and either form their own insurance risk pool or purchase insurance collectively. Some states, such as Vermont and Hawaii, enacted laws to encourage the development of alternative methods to manage risk, such as captive insurance or risk retention groups.
