= Risk financing =

Concept in business economics

In business economics, risk financing is concerned with providing funds to cover the financial effect of unexpected losses experienced by a firm.

Traditional forms of finance include risk transfer through reinsurance, funded retention by way of reserves (often called self-insurance), and risk pooling.

Alternative risk finance is the use of products and solutions which have grown out of the convergence of the banking and insurance industry. They include captive insurance companies and catastrophic bonds, and finite risk products such loss portfolio transfers and adverse development covers. Professor Lawrence A. Cunningham of George Washington University suggests adapting cat bonds to the risks that large auditing firms face in cases asserting massive securities law damages.

== Risk retention and transfer ==
Risk financing commonly involves a choice between retaining losses within the organisation and transferring some or all of the financial consequences to another party. Retention may involve paying losses from current cash flow, reserves, or a self-insurance arrangement, while transfer commonly involves insurance, reinsurance, or other contractual risk-transfer mechanisms.

The appropriate mix of retention and transfer depends on the expected frequency and severity of losses, the organisation's financial capacity, and the availability and cost of external protection. In disaster risk financing, governments and organisations may use instruments such as reserves, contingent credit, insurance, reinsurance, or catastrophe bonds to secure funding before losses occur rather than relying only on post-event financing.
