= Insurance Regulatory Information System =

The Insurance Regulatory Information System (IRIS) is a database of insurance companies in the United States run by the National Association of Insurance Commissioners. IRIS is designed to provide information about insurers' financial solvency.

== Rating method ==
IRIS uses the financial statements of the insurer to calculate a series of financial ratios, which are then taken as a measure of the insurer's overall financial condition. If the ratios do not fit into a predetermined range, then IRIS may identify the company for regulation by appropriate authorities.

The system acts as an early-warning protection, which aids state insurance departments to pick out those companies that show financial problems. The ratios are merely guidelines, though: often a financial disaster comes without warning, or defies prediction.
