= Risk pool =

Insurance risk management sharing liability

A risk pool is a form of risk management that is mostly practiced by insurance companies, which come together to form a pool to provide protection to insurance companies against catastrophic risks such as floods or earthquakes. The term is also used to describe the pooling of similar risks within the concept of insurance. It is basically like multiple insurance companies coming together to form one. While risk pooling is necessary for insurance to work, not all risks can be effectively pooled in a voluntary insurance bracket unless there is a subsidy available to encourage participation.

== In supply chain management ==
Risk pooling is an important concept in supply chain management. Risk pooling suggests that demand variability is reduced if one aggregates demand across locations because as demand is aggregated across different locations, it becomes more likely that high demand from one customer will be offset by low demand from another. The reduction in variability allows a decrease in safety stock and therefore reduces average inventory.

For example, in the centralized distribution system, the warehouse serves all customers, which leads to a reduction in variability measured by either the standard deviation or the coefficient of variation.

The three critical points to risk pooling are:

1. Centralized inventory saves safety stock and average inventory in the system.
2. When demands from markets are negatively correlated, the higher the coefficient of variation, the greater the benefit obtained from centralized systems; that is, the greater the benefit from risk pooling.
3. The benefits from risk pooling depend directly on relative market behavior. If two markets are competing when demand from both markets are more or less than the average demand, the demands from the market are said to be positively correlated. Thus, the benefits derived from risk pooling decreases as the correlation between demands from both markets becomes more positive.

== In government ==
An Intergovernmental risk pool (IRP) operates under the same general principle except that it is made up of public entities, such as government agencies, school districts, county governments and municipalities. They provide alternative risk financing and transfer mechanisms to their members through self-funding by particular types of risk being underwritten with contributions (premiums), with losses and expenses shared in agreed ratios. In other words, intergovernmental risk pools are a cooperative group of governmental entities joining together through written agreement to finance an exposure, liability, or risk. Although they are not considered insurance, pools extend nearly identical coverage through similar underwriting and claim activities, as well as provide other risk management services. Pools have many advantages over insurers for their members. Pools tend to protect their members from cyclic insurance rates, offer loss prevention services, offer savings (as they are non-profit organizations and do not lose funds through broker fees), and have focus and expertise in governmental entities that are often not found in insurers.

Intergovernmental risk pools may include authorities, joint power authorities, associations, agencies, trusts, risk management funds, and other risk pools.

== See also ==
- U.S. health insurance risk pools
- List of disasters by cost
