= McCarran–Ferguson Act =

United States federal law

- Other short titles: Insurance Regulation Act of 1945
- Long title: An Act To express the intent of Congress with reference to the regulation of the business of insurance
- Enacted by: the 79th United States Congress

Citations
- Public law: Pub. L. 79–15
- Statutes at Large: 59 Stat. 33

Codification
- Titles amended: 15
- U.S.C. sections amended: 1011–1015

Legislative history
- Introduced in the Senate as S. 340 by Pat McCarran; Committee consideration by Senate Judiciary; Passed the House on; Passed the Senate on; Signed into law by President Franklin D. Roosevelt on March 9, 1945

Major amendments
- Competitive Health Insurance Reform Act of 2020

United States Supreme Court cases
- United States v. South-Eastern Underwriters Association

The McCarran–Ferguson Act, 15 U.S.C. §§ 1011–1015, is a United States federal law that exempts the business of insurance from most federal regulation, including federal antitrust laws to a limited extent. The 79th Congress passed the McCarran–Ferguson Act in 1945 after the Supreme Court ruled in United States v. South-Eastern Underwriters Association that the federal government could regulate insurance companies under the authority of the Commerce Clause in the U.S. Constitution and that the federal antitrust laws applied to the insurance industry.

The Act was sponsored by Senators Pat McCarran (D-Nev.) and Homer Ferguson (R-Mich.).

== Overview ==
The McCarran–Ferguson Act does not itself regulate insurance, nor does it mandate that states regulate insurance. It provides that "Acts of Congress" which do not expressly purport to regulate the "business of insurance" will not preempt state laws or regulations that regulate the "business of insurance."

Specifically, concerning federal antitrust laws, it exempts the "business of insurance" as long as the state regulates in that area, with the proviso that cases of boycott, coercion, and intimidation remain prohibited regardless of state regulation. By contrast, most other federal laws will not apply to insurance whether the states regulate in that area or not.

== Background of state regulation of insurance ==
Until the middle of the 19th century, insurance largely went unregulated in the United States. In 1850, New Hampshire was the first state to appoint an insurance commissioner. In 1852, Massachusetts appointed a commission, and California, Connecticut, Indiana, Missouri, New York, and Vermont established a separate insurance department or vested the power to regulate insurance in an existing agency. Shortly after that, other states followed until, by 1871, nearly every state had "some type of supervision and control over insurance companies." Often the legislation and rules promulgated by insurance commissions of one state conflicted with those of others. And in some cases, the rules that applied to out-of-state insurers deprived them of substantial rights. For example, one state required out-of-state insurers to post a bond that it would not appeal any case to the United States Supreme Court.

Insurers early attempted to oust states from regulation by using the constitutional argument that the business of insurance amounted to "Commerce …among the several states" and by virtue of the Commerce Clause of the federal constitution, regulation of it was exclusively given to the federal government. The United States Supreme Court first decided a case on this basis in 1868, rejecting the insurers' argument in the context of an out-of-state insurer selling policies in another state For over 75 years, the Supreme Court rejected insurers' attempt to avoid state regulation on this basis.

== History ==
In 1942, at the request of the Attorney General of Missouri (whose insurance regulators felt powerless to correct abuses they had identified since 1922), the Department of Justice investigated and a grand jury in Georgia indicted the South-Eastern Underwriters Association, 27 of its officers and 198 member companies. The indictment charged the defendants with two counts of antitrust violations: (1) conspiracy under Section 1 of the Sherman Act to fix the premium rates on certain fire insurance policies and boycott non-complying independent sales agencies that did not comply; and (2) monopolization of markets for the sale of fire insurance policies in the states of Alabama, Florida, Georgia, North Carolina, South Carolina, and Virginia in violation of Section 2 of the Sherman Act. The district court sustained the defendants' demurrer and dismissed the indictment, holding that "the business of insurance is not commerce, either intrastate or interstate" and that it "is not interstate commerce or interstate trade, though it might be considered a trade subject to local laws either State or Federal, where the commerce clause is not the authority relied upon." In January 1955, the Supreme Court heard arguments on the prosecutors' appeal from the district court.

The question in the case, which the Court formulated itself, was "whether the Commerce Clause grants to Congress the power to regulate insurance transactions stretching across state lines." For nearly 80 years before then, the Supreme Court had consistently held that "Issuing a policy of insurance is not a transaction of commerce," "the business of insurance is not commerce," and "contracts of insurance are not commerce at all, neither state nor interstate." Those cases, however, dealt with the negative implications of the Commerce Clause, i.e., whether the business was "interstate commerce" such that the individual states could not regulate it. The South-Eastern Underwriters case, however, involved the question whether the business of insurance was "interstate commerce" sufficient to allow Congressional regulation. The Supreme Court, in United States v. South-Eastern Underwriters Association, 322 U.S. 533 (1944), 4-3 decision written by Justice Hugo Black, reversed the district court, holding that (1) the Sherman Act intended to cover the alleged acts of monopolization; and (2) that the transaction of insurance across state lines was "commerce among the states" which the Constitution permitted Congress to regulate.

The three judges who dissented did so for different reasons. Chief Justice Stone argued that the writing of insurance in one state to cover risk in another was not "interstate commerce" as a constitutional matter and that the actions charged were not within the purview of the Sherman Act. His opinion was largely based on the Court's previous decision on the negative implications of the Commerce Clause. Justice Jackson, in addition to concurring with the Chief Justice, urged the impracticality of allowing both state and federal regulation of insurance and, given the precedent, believed that it should be done by the states, at least absent a specific declaration by Congress. Justice Frankfurter allowed that Congress's power under the Commerce Clause reached these actions but argued that the Sherman Act was not an express warrant that Congress intended to enter this area of commerce.

== Legislative history ==
Since the Paul case in 1868, it had been widely believed that the federal government was excluded from regulating the insurance industry. Before the South-Eastern Underwriters Association case, "insurance already was one of the most highly regulated industries in the American economy," with every state having an insurance department and detailed laws on the protection of policyholders in case of insolvency. But regulation of other aspects of insurance varied widely among the states. The prospect of a federal take-over of insurance regulation alarmed state regulators, and thirty-five states had filed amicus curiae briefs supporting the decision of the district court. State insurance regulators and insurance executives complained to Congress that the decision would upset the extensive system of state regulation and taxation (as Justice Jackson had warned), even though Attorney General Biddle denied any such intent.

In response to this decision, on March 9, 1945, Congress passed the McCarran–Ferguson Act, which, among other things:

- partially exempts insurance companies from the federal anti-trust legislation that applies to most businesses
- allows states to regulate insurance
- allows states to establish mandatory licensing requirements
- preserves certain state laws of insurance.

== Significance to U.S. health care reform in the 21st century ==
One aspect of Republican proposals for healthcare reform in the United States is allowing interstate competition for health insurance, potentially requiring modification of the McCarran–Ferguson Act. In February 2010, the House of Representatives voted 406-19 to repeal the McCarran–Ferguson Act with regard to health insurance.

The McCarran–Ferguson Act was amended in 2021 with the Competitive Health Insurance Reform Act of 2020, limiting the scope of exemptions for health insurance and dental insurance.
