= National Association of Insurance Commissioners =

American organization

- Abbreviation: NAIC
- Founded: 1871; 155 years ago
- Headquarters: Kansas City, Missouri, U.S.
- Coordinates: 39.100391°N 94.582557°W
- President: Jon Godfread
- Chief Executive Officer: Gary Anderson
- Website: www.naic.org
- Formerly called: National Insurance Convention, National Convention of Insurance Commissioners

The National Association of Insurance Commissioners (NAIC) is the U.S. standard-setting and regulatory support organization created and governed by the chief insurance regulators from the 50 states, the District of Columbia, and five U.S. territories.

== Mission and function ==
Through the NAIC, state insurance regulators establish standards and best practices, conduct peer review, and coordinate their regulatory oversight. NAIC staff supports these efforts and represents the collective views of state regulators domestically and internationally. NAIC members, together with the central resources of the NAIC, form the national system of state-based insurance regulation in the U.S. The NAIC is an Internal Revenue Code Section 501(c)(3) non-profit organization.

The NAIC acts as a forum for the creation of model laws and regulations. Each state decides whether to pass each NAIC model law or regulation, and each state may make changes in the enactment process, but the models are widely, albeit somewhat irregularly, adopted. The NAIC also acts at the national level to advance laws and policies supported by state insurance regulators. The NAIC also is responsible for creating the statutory accounting principles (SAP) upon which insurance accounting is based. SAP is often contrasted with Generally Accepted Accounting Principles (GAAP) and is notable for its very conservative valuation methods. Additionally, the NAIC promulgates the NAIC annual statement which incorporates SAP and must be filed with the department of insurance in every state in which an insurance company writes business.

The NAIC is not a regulator; while its members are the insurance commissioners (i.e., the chief insurance regulators) of each U.S. state and six territories, the NAIC is a non-governmental organization that concerns itself with insurance regulatory matters but does not actually regulate. The states have not delegated their regulatory authority to the NAIC.

Although the NAIC's mandate is to benefit state regulators and insurance consumers by promoting uniform laws and regulations, by promoting uniformity of regulation among the states, it also makes it easier for insurance companies to comply with the laws and regulations in all states in which they do business.

=== National meetings and publications ===
The NAIC holds three national meetings a year, in the spring, summer, and fall throughout the United States. Members of state insurance departments, NAIC staff, and insurance industry representatives gather to learn about new, upcoming NAIC initiatives on emerging topics in the field of insurance regulation. During the meeting, committees, task forces, and working groups gather to discuss and review drafts of new and revised model laws, guidelines, and white papers. All amendments and committee actions are recorded in a memorandum and made available on the NAIC website.

Following every national meeting, the official Proceedings of the NAIC is published. The Proceedings serve as the permanent record of all NAIC actions, including model laws and regulations, as well as committee and task force minutes and reports. The current and some archival issues of the Proceedings are publicly available for download in PDF format on the NAIC Publications department website.

== History ==
After Paul v. Virginia, state insurance commissioners formed the National Insurance Convention in 1871 to coordinate; this became the National Convention of Insurance Commissioners and then the National Association of Insurance Commissioners. During the first session, a uniform annual statement was adopted and life insurance companies but not fire insurance companies were required to make reserve deposits to protect their policyholders. In the second session a model law was passed; many states adopted a standard fire insurance policy known as the New York Standard Fire Policy of 1886. It has been argued that the policy was designed to favor the industry, as it contains various conditions which, if not adhered to, render the policy void.

== Organization structure and officers ==
National Association of Insurance Commissioners was incorporated in Delaware on October 6, 1999. NAIC's central office is in Kansas City, Missouri in the Town Pavilion, its executive offices are in Washington, D.C., and the Capital Markets & Investment Analysis Office is in New York City.

Officers of NAIC include a president, president-elect, vice president, and secretary-treasurer, who are elected annually by the membership by secret ballot. To help organize NAIC's efforts, the United States has been divided into four geographic zones: Northeastern, Southeastern, Midwestern and Western; each zone has its own chair, vice chair and secretary who sit on the NAIC's executive committee. NAIC also maintains additional standing committees to address specific charges as approved by NAIC leadership.

In March 2024, the NAIC announced Gary Anderson as the Chief Executive Officer, effective May 1, 2024. For 2025, North Dakota Insurance Commissioner Jon Godfread serves as NAIC President.

== Past Presidents ==
- Jon Godfread (2025)
- Andrew N. Mais (2024)
- Chlora Lindley-Myers (2023)
- Dean Cameron (2022)
- David Altmaier (2021)
- Raymond Farmer (2020)
- Eric Cioppa (2019)
- Johnnie L. Caldwell
- Kenneth E. DeShetler

== See also ==
- Insurance Regulatory Information System
