= Insurance cycle =

Tendency in the insurance industry

An insurance cycle, also known as an underwriting cycle, is a term describing the tendency of the insurance industry to swing between profitable and unprofitable periods over time. The concept is most closely associated with property insurance and casualty insurance, where premiums, underwriting profits and the availability of cover are observed to rise and fall in a cyclical pattern rather than at a steady rate.

In a typical cycle insurers experience alternating phases that are often described as hard and soft market conditions. During a hard market, underwriting standards tighten, capacity is more constrained and premium rates increase. During a soft market, competition leads to lower premiums, broader policy terms and more readily available cover, which can in turn reduce profitability. The length and intensity of cycles vary by line of business and by country, but many studies of non life insurance report cycles that last several years and sometimes around a decade.

All industries experience business cycles of growth and decline, 'boom and bust'. These cycles are particularly important in the insurance and reinsurance industry as they are especially unpredictable. The insurance cycle affects all areas of insurance except life insurance, where there is enough data and a large base of similar risks (i.e., people) to accurately predict claims, and therefore minimise the risk that the cycle poses to business.

== Definition and overview ==
The insurance underwriting cycle is commonly defined as the tendency of property and casualty insurance premiums, profits and available coverage to exhibit a cyclical pattern over time. Studies of loss ratios and combined ratios in these lines find that underwriting results move through alternating periods of relatively strong and relatively weak profitability, with corresponding changes in prices and in the willingness of insurers to accept risks.

The cycle is usually described in terms of hard market phases, in which premiums and underwriting margins are high and capacity is limited, and soft market phases, in which premiums and margins are low and capacity is abundant.

Although cyclical behaviour has been observed in a number of insurance markets, the term insurance cycle is primarily applied to non-life lines such as property insurance and liability insurance, which are written on relatively short term contracts and are sensitive to underwriting results.

Underwriting cycles are related to, but distinct from, general business cycles. Research has found correlations between underwriting results and economic variables such as interest rates and output growth. Regulators and rating agencies pay attention to the position in the insurance cycle when assessing the solvency and capital adequacy of insurance companies.

== History ==
The insurance cycle is a phenomenon that has been understood since at least the 1920s. Since then it has been considered an insurance 'fact of life'. Most commentators believe that underwriting cycles are inevitable, primarily "because the uncertainty inherent in matching insurance prices to future losses creates an environment in which the motivations, ambitions, and fears of a complex cast of characters can play out." Lloyd's counters that this has become "a self-fulfilling prophecy".

In the mid-2000s, the industry sought to move from describing the cycle to managing it. Lloyd's of London published guidance on cycle management, including a paper commonly cited as “Seven steps to managing the cycle”, which argued that treating the cycle as an unavoidable force of nature encouraged undisciplined underwriting and capital management.

Lloyd's annual surveys of underwriters around the same period reported that, for several consecutive years, respondents ranked managing the cycle as one of the most important challenges facing the market. These initiatives, together with later work on capital regulation and economic capital models, fed into the development of risk-based approaches that aim to keep pricing and growth policies consistent with long-run solvency constraints rather than with short-term competitive pressure.

== Phases of the insurance cycle ==
Illustration of an insurance underwriting cycle. Premium levels gradually fall during soft market conditions, rise sharply after a large loss event and then decline again as competition and capacity increase.

The insurance cycle is often described as a sequence of soft and hard market conditions in property and casualty insurance. In soft markets the supply of cover is ample, competition is strong and premium rates tend to decline, while in hard markets the supply of cover is more limited, pricing is firm and insurers apply stricter underwriting standards. Cycles do not necessarily follow a simple pattern and different lines of business or geographic markets can be in different phases at the same time, but the hard and soft market distinction is used widely in both academic work and industry commentary.

=== Soft market ===
Soft market conditions are most likely to occur after a period in which insurers have reported strong profits and capital has accumulated, whether through retained earnings or new equity issues. Existing companies may respond to high returns by expanding their underwriting or by offering broader terms to attract business, while new entrants may be drawn into the market by the prospect of earning similar returns. As competition increases, premium rates tend to fall and policy wordings may become more generous, for example through higher limits, lower deductibles or wider cover, which can reduce expected underwriting margins.

In a prolonged soft market loss ratios and combined ratios usually move upwards as claims experience and expenses catch up with earlier price reductions. This as a phase in which the discipline imposed by solvency constraints and rating agency capital requirements weakens because recent experience has been favourable and because growth in premium volume is rewarded, which can reinforce pressure to cut prices.

=== Hard market ===
Hard market conditions are associated with periods in which insurers face capital constraints or perceive that the risk of future losses has increased. They often follow a sequence of poor underwriting results, large catastrophe losses or investment losses that reduce free capital and make it more difficult or more costly to support the existing level of business. In a hard market insurers respond by raising premiums, tightening policy wordings, increasing deductibles and being more selective about which risks they accept.

Reinsurers play an important part in hard market phases because higher reinsurance prices or reduced reinsurance capacity can reinforce primary insurers' incentives to restrict cover or to raise rates. Some markets see a growth in the use of alternative risk transfer and capital market instruments when traditional capacity is scarce.

=== Turning points and shocks ===
The transition from soft to hard market conditions does not always occur smoothly. Large insured catastrophe events that generate major losses for insurers and reinsurers can accelerate a change in pricing and underwriting standards, particularly in catastrophe-exposed property and specialty lines. A series of adverse years or a period of low investment returns can have a similar effect by eroding capital and drawing attention to the need for higher technical pricing.

When market conditions are very hard, high premium rates and a perception of attractive returns tend to attract new capital and new entrants, and existing insurers may relax some of the constraints introduced earlier in the cycle. Over time this additional capacity and competition can push markets back towards softer conditions, which is one reason why many regard the interaction of supply, demand and capital flows as central to the insurance cycle.

== Explanatory theories ==
The insurance cycle has several interpretations in the academic and professional literature, and there is not one accepted reason. The majority of reports highlight a mix of capital and economic conditions, institutional and competitive aspects of insurance markets, and the actions of managers and underwriters.

=== Economic and capital based explanations ===
In this view, periods of high interest rates or strong investment income encourage insurers to rely more on investment earnings and to accept lower underwriting margins, a pattern sometimes described as cash flow underwriting. When investment opportunities deteriorate, or interest rates fall, underwriting results become more important for returns on surplus, and insurers respond by tightening pricing and coverage, contributing to a shift towards hard market conditions.

In related work, capacity constraint models in which the amount of surplus available to support underwriting has a direct effect on prices and volumes. Large insured losses or falls in asset values reduce capital, which limits the volume of business that can be written at a given risk of insolvency and leads to higher premiums and stricter terms until capital is rebuilt. As profits recover and new capital enters the market, competition intensifies and rates tend to soften, so shocks to capital and the cost of raising new funds can help produce multi-year cycles in underwriting results.

=== Competition, regulation and institutional factors ===
Another line of explanation stresses competitive and institutional features of insurance markets. When a line of business appears profitable, existing insurers may expand and new entrants may be attracted, which increases competition and puts downward pressure on premiums and underwriting standards. If prices fall below levels consistent with long run claims and expenses, periods of poor underwriting performance follow, and insurers then respond by raising rates, tightening terms and withdrawing from marginal classes of business.

In lines jurisdictions with prior approval of rates or detailed tariff structures, regulatory processes can slow responses to changes in loss experience, while prudent reserving and smoothing of reported earnings can delay the visible impact of adverse results.

=== Behavioural explanations ===
Behavioural explanations argue that changes in attitudes to risk, competition and career incentives contribute to the cycle. After periods of heavy losses or negative headlines, executives and underwriters become more cautious, risk appetites shrink and firms avoid challenging conservative pricing, which supports a shift to hard market conditions. As time passes without major losses and competitive pressure to maintain or grow premium income increases, memories of past events fade, underwriters become more willing to compete on price and terms and the market moves back towards softer conditions.

In addition, behavioural work points to herd behavior, organisational culture and incentive schemes as possible drivers of cyclical pricing. For example, narratives about where the market is in the cycle can shape expectations and encourage firms to move in step with peers, particularly when managers are judged relative to competitor performance. Surveys and case studies report that many practitioners regard the cycle as a persistent feature of the industry, but recent research tends to treat it as the outcome of several interacting mechanisms rather than a single dominant cause.

== See also ==
- Underwriting
- Dynamic financial analysis
- Insurance-linked security
- Solvency II
- Systemic risk
