= Juniperus Capital =

Bermuda-based hedge fund

Juniperus Capital Limited
- Type: Private
- Industry: Hedge fund (collateralised catastrophe reinsurance and insurance-linked securities)
- Founded: 2008
- Headquarters: Bermuda
- Key people: Philip A. Lotz (CEO & Chairman); Stephen A. Velotti (Chief Underwriting Officer)
- Website: www.juniperuscapital.com https://www.pillar-capital.com/

Juniperus Capital Limited (Juniperus Capital or JCL) is a Bermuda-based hedge fund. It was incorporated in Bermuda on April 11, 2008. The investment management company became operational in May 2008.

Juniperus Capital Limited is now known as Pillar Capital Management.

== Management ==
The fund is managed by CEO and Chairman Philip A. Lotz (who was formerly the CEO of Swiss Re Capital Management and Advisory) and Chief Underwriting Officer, Stephen A. Velotti.

Juniperus, now Pillar Capital Management, is jointly owned by the Management Team and Transatlantic Holdings, Inc.

== Fund ==
Juniperus manages Juniperus Insurance Opportunity Fund. The fund focuses on the collateralised catastrophe reinsurance and insurance-linked securities markets. Substantial investors in the fund include New York-based reinsurance and risk intermediary Benfield Group Ltd., Tokyo-based Itochu Corporation, Transatlantic Reinsurance Co., and Juniperus Capital management.

Forbes and The Telegraph reported in 2008 that Benfield Group announced it had made a $50 million (£25.3m) cash investment in Juniperus Insurance Opportunity Fund. The investment was reportedly made through Benfield Advisory, the group's corporate finance section.

The company is named after the Juniperus bermudiana, cedar trees found only in Bermuda that are extremely hardy in the face of hurricanes and other adverse conditions.

== Ownership ==
Benfield holds a significant ownership position in Juniperus Capital, having purchased $6.6 million of the shares of the company. Benfield also committed to provide up to $2 million in working capital to Juniperus Capital.

In December 2009, Itochu Corporation made a JPY 5 billion equity investment in Juniperus Capital.
