= Alternative risk transfer =

Alternative risk transfer (ART) is the use of techniques other than traditional insurance and reinsurance to provide risk-bearing entities with coverage or protection. The field of alternative risk transfer grew out of a series of insurance capacity crises in the 1970s through 1990s that drove purchasers of traditional coverage to seek more robust ways to buy protection.

Most of these techniques permit investors in the capital markets to take a more direct role in providing insurance and reinsurance protection, and as such the broad field of alternative risk transfer is said to be bringing about a convergence of insurance and financial markets.

== Areas of activity ==
A major sector of alternative risk transfer activity is risk securitization including catastrophe bonds and reinsurance sidecars.

Standardization and trading of risk in non-indemnity form is another area of alternative risk transfer and includes industry loss warranties.

In addition, a number of approaches involve funding risk transfer, often within the structures of the traditional reinsurance market. Captive insurance companies are formed by firms and re/insurers to receive premiums that are generally held and invested as a "funded" layer of insurance for the parent company. Some captives purchase excess of loss reinsurance and offer coverage to third parties, sometimes to leverage their skills and sometimes for tax reasons. Financial reinsurance in various forms (finite, surplus relief, funded, etc.) consists of various approaches to reinsurance involving a very high level of prospective or retrospective premiums relative to the quantity of risk assumed. While such approaches involve "risk finance" as opposed to "risk transfer," they are still generally referred to under the heading of alternative risk transfer

Alternative risk transfer is often used to refer to activities through which reinsurers or insurers transform risks from the capital markets into insurance or reinsurance form. Such transformation can occur through the policy itself, or through the use of a transformer reinsure, a method important in credit risk markets, hard asset value coverage and weather markets. Reinsurers were notable participants in the early development of the synthetic CDO and weather derivative markets through such activities.

A subset of activities in which reinsurers take capital markets risks is dual-trigger or multiple trigger contracts. Such contracts exist between a protection buyer and a protection seller, and require that two or more events take place before a payment from the latter to the former is "triggered." For example, an oil company may desire protection against certain natural hazards, but may only need such protection if oil prices are low, in which case they would purchase a dual trigger derivative or re/insurance contract. There was a great deal of interest in such approaches in the late 1990s, and re/insurers worked to develop combined risk and enterprise risk insurance. Reliance Insurance extended this further and offered earnings insurance until the company suspended its own business operations. This area of alternative risk transfer activity diminished after the general hardening of the commercial insurance and reinsurance markets following the 9-11 terrorist attacks.

Another area of convergence is the emergence of pure insurance risk hedge funds, that function economically like fully collateralized reinsurers and sometimes operate through reinsurance vehicles, but take the form of hedge funds.

Life insurance companies have developed a battery of alternative risk transfer approaches including life insurance securitization, full recourse reserve funding, funded letters of credit, surplus relief reinsurance, administrative reinsurance and related techniques. Because life reinsurance is more "financial" to begin with, there is less separation between the conventional and alternative risk transfer markets than in the property & casualty sector.

Emerging areas of alternative risk transfer include intellectual property insurance, automobile insurance securitization and life settlements. It should be possible to adapt these instruments to other contexts. It has, for example, been suggested adapting cat bonds to the risks that large auditing firms face in cases asserting massive securities law damages.

== Customization ==
The major market of alternative risk transfer is through self-insurance, where companies are still regulated by the government but it allows a company to have self-efficiencies through reducing costs and allowing a faster claims process. The alternative risk transfer market gives a company many types of choices in regards to policy-making, giving it a customized nature. The features of alternative risk transfer are that it allows the consumer to get a policy that matches their unique needs, coverage can be obtained for several years and for more than one line. In addition, due to their non-traditional nature of business, much of the risk covered under alternative risk transfer is mainly obtained through the transfer of said risk to the capital markets, allowing companies to source its capital. The non-traditional nature of alternative risk transfer thus allows those with different needs, from regular insurance customers, to get risk management that fits their needs.

=== Cost reduction and simplified administration ===
Through the merger of risk transfer and retention, alternative risk transfer gives companies protection at a low cost, to the benefit of both insured and insurer. Many programs that consolidate risk through instruments, such as enterprise risk management programs, can reap in benefits as a result of the alternative risk transfer program being implemented. In addition from cost reductions, alternative risk transfer programs are not as easily influenced by the market, allowing stability and a more predictable market from risks. It is also similar to a surplus lines market to where it also attempts to cover, through financing or transferring, non-traditional exposures and risks, especially ones large in cost. One of the drivers of the management is that they seek to reduce both taxes and costs, though in return the costs of transactions can be high. The advantages of using alternative risk transfer is that diversification exists through the finance or transfer of risks, tax benefits, and a low cost to companies in different industries. The disadvantages are moral hazard risks, among other types of risk.

Since the mid-2000s, many more companies are seeking to obtain alternate means of risk transfer through alternate risk transfer programs. This has resulted in a shift where there is more focus on these types of alternate risk transfer and develop this market further, in addition to a changing insurance market and further technological advances. The development and shift to ART has then allowed companies to re-think how their risk is going to be transferred or much can be retained, allowing companies to seek risks that are low volatility and predictable and losses are high in frequency but low in severity.

== Pitfalls of Alternative Risk Transfer ==
=== Under-Utilization of Alternative Risk Transfer ===
The main reason that many companies shy away from using ART is due to the inertia that companies experience when considering ART as a form of risk transfer. If companies have been successful in the past with a more conventional and well-documented form of risk transfer, those companies will tend to remain with their existing form of coverage and become very reluctant to shift. This unwilling and cynical response, coupled with a lack of historical data and precedent, has generated a stereotyped stigma that categorizes ART as an untested and unpredictable form of managing risk. However, the skepticism of businesses and risk managers are not misplaced. It is not uncommon for companies to either under-protect or over-protect their risk precisely due to the fact that ART is still largely unrefined and inexperienced. Yet, the largest determining criterion for the reluctance of companies to adopt ART in their business is that utilization of such a system usually requires a full foundation-to-roof restructuring of culture. Employees must adapt, along with the company, to view risk through a different perspective; as well as, adjust corporate methodologies of analyzing and calculating risk.

There are 3 key components that companies must account for and fully understand when considering the application of a form of ART in the corporate setting. As ART is still in its infancy, the stringent standards that govern conventional forms of risk transfer do not exist in ART products. This allows products to be tailored to the unique situation of the company; unfortunately, customization of ART products cause difficulty when gauging the appropriateness and reasonability of a quoted price as well as the fairness of the terms of agreement. The lack of historical backing and burdening amount of doubt greatly attributes to the uncertainty when considering such products.

=== Considerations to Reduce Uncertainty ===
Fully Understand the Product

- The functionality and applicability found in customized ART products leads to difficulty comparing and determining a favorable price and fair terms
  - What is the operation of the product and how is it executed?
  - How does this product affect a company's economic capital requirements?
  - What is the inner working of the product and what are the rewards given specific conditions?
  - How severe will the cost of this product be to a company's capital?
  - What history does this product have with other companies in their dealings?
  - How does it compare to traditional means of coverage?

Know the Seller

- Due to the lack of history and many unknown variables, practice extra caution when reviewing the product for compatibility.
  - How has this coverage performed in the past? Does it pertain to the current deal?
  - Can previous/current customers provide feedback on performance of company?
  - In the event a company is inexperienced in bundling ART deals, does the company demonstrate competency in the ability to perform such a deal?

Regulatory and Accounting Standards

- ART products began to make a reputation for themselves in the 1990s when numerous markets and institutions began breaking the barriers that made them mutually exclusive
  - Caused ART products to become increasing complex as a single product may be susceptible to multiple regulations and standard boards
  - Expert legal and financial consultation is strongly advised.

== Alternative Risk Transfer Products Categories ==
1.) Uncommon mediums used for common risks

- Risk Retention Groups (RRG): self-insurance capital (money) contributed by several companies that can range from small to medium in size.
- Self-Insured Retentions (SIR): capital (money) set aside to be used when losses occur.
- Earnings Protection: policies that are available by specific loss of earnings in a certain financial period.
- Captives: a side insurance company (subsidiary) that insures a parent company only.
- Rent-a-Captives: captives that are shared among several companies that are not the parent company, but funds are controlled by the parent company.
- Finite Insurance: multi-year insurance policies.
- Multi-Trigger Policies: policies that are triggered by distinct events within a distinct time frame.
- Integrated risk: policies that cover a variety of distinct risks (some of them not being common insurance risks).

2.) Mediums based in capital markets

- Securitization: the procedure when risks are merged into debt/equity instruments that can be traded in the financial markets.
- Insurance-linked bonds: bonds that lose their principal/interest in full or partially if a predetermined event happens.
- Contingent Surplus Notes: notes that supply holders with capital (money) when a loss occurs.
- Weather Derivatives: policies made available by certain meteorological events of certain extremities happen.
- Cat-E-Puts (Catastrophe Equity Put Options): options that permits a company to sell/issue equity at a set price in case a certain catastrophe happens.

== Future of Alternative Risk Transfer ==
The future of alternative risk transfer is that it will grow with the assistance of the same elements that first expanded the market. The factors that can be recognized in which helped the growth in previous years and that will likely help in coming years are being able to cope with market cycles, diversify exposures, capitalize enterprise value, and cope with forces of regulation and deregulation. Also, in the future, risk management will be something that is even more common especially in companies that lie in other nations. Other factors that should be considered in risk management are, but not limited to technological exposures and intellectual property rights exposures; which in today's day and age are something that could happen very easily. The future of risk transfer does look ever so bright, but there will be obstacles in the way; these include contractual differences, capacity/supply problems, pricing challenges, and organizational complexities. Even though educational matters were not one of the obstacles, it plays a role in the growth of risk management because knowledge of firm wide risks is needed. This can be found in other industries, but needs to be considered when assuming the budget as well as the time. Of all the obstacles observed, each one has a setback on its own and will cause an increase in the timeline in addition to adding to the costs, but if risk management is set to the highest standards, these will just be tests along the way that add strength to the system rather than establishing something not worthwhile.

== Key market participants ==
- Banks, e.g. JPMorgan Chase, Goldman Sachs, Bank of America, and Citibank.
- Insurers, e.g. AIG, Zurich, USAA, and XL Capital
- Reinsurers, e.g. Munich Re, Hannover Re. and Swiss Re.
- Brokers, e.g. Willis, Marsh, Aon
- Consultants, e.g. Towers Watson, Mercer

Sovereigns: Mexico is the only national sovereign to have issued cat bonds (in 2006, for hedging earthquake risk; in 2009, a multistructure instrument covering earthquake and hurricane risk).

== See also ==
- Captive insurance – Insurance company created and owned by a firm to insure its own risks
- Reinsurance – Insurance purchased by an insurance company
- Finite risk insurance
- Dual trigger insurance
- Weather derivatives – Financial instrument
- Risk financing – Concept in business economics
