= Finite risk insurance =

Finite risk insurance is the term applied within the insurance industry to describe an alternative risk transfer product that is typically a multi-year insurance contract where the insurer bears limited underwriting, credit, investment and timing risk. The effect is similar to self-insurance by the insured as they will pay the whole amount of the risk, but can spread it out over several years. The assessment of risk is often conservative.

The insurer and the insured share in the net profit of the transaction, including loss experience and investment income. The premium is generally well in excess of the present value of a conservative estimate of loss experience. The policy generally contains retrospective rating provisions such as commutation provisions, additional premium provisions, or an experience account.

Finite risk insurance excludes products expressly sold as annuities.

The term "blended finite risk insurance" is often used to describe an insurance product that has the characteristics of finite risk, but with more risk transfer included than generally is the case for finite risk. While there is no bright line test for risk transfer, the distinction would be most readily noted in the premium for blended finite risk insurance, which must be less than the present value of a conservative estimate of loss experience by a readily noticeable degree.

== Important terms ==
"Additional premium provision" means, in the context of finite risk insurance, a provision of an insurance or reinsurance contract that requires or strongly encourages the insured to pay the insurer some calculable amount as a result of losses paid or incurred under that insurance or reinsurance contract, excluding provisions for additional premium due to changes in exposure or policy audit.

"Commutation provision" means a verbal or written agreement, whether or not formally incorporated into an insurance or reinsurance policy, that allows the policyholder to commute the policy, usually implying that all liabilities and rights created by that contract are extinguished in return for the balance of an experience account. Generally provisions such as "profit sharing" or "low claims bonus," which also produce a return of premium that can be reduced by claims payments, are not considered Commutation Provisions if they do not extinguish the contract. Loss-based return and additional premium provisions in conventional loss-based rating plans, e.g., incurred loss retrospectively rated insurance and so-called "retention plans" used commonly in insuring US Workers' Compensation, are generally not considered Commutation Provisions for much the same reason.

Sample language for such a provision might resemble this:

=== Commutation by policyholder ===
This policy may be commuted by the policyholder (the “commutation”) effective as of December 31, 200_ or on each two year anniversary of such date thereafter, upon not less than ninety (90) days advance written notice to the Insurer. The date of the Commutation (the "Commutation Date") shall be set forth in such notice. Effective the Commutation Date, the Policyholder and the Insurer, finally and irrevocably release each other from any and all liability and obligations to each other under or in connection with this Policy, whether billed or unbilled, whether reported or unreported and whether known or unknown; provided that, upon the Commutation, the Insurer shall pay to the Policyholder an amount equal to the Loss Experience Account. Such Loss Experience Account shall be due and payable to the Policyholder on the Commutation Date.

"Experience account" when used in the context of finite risk refers to a provision in an insurance or reinsurance contract that, using some function of premium, insurer charges, losses paid or payable under the contract, subrogation proceeds, and interest rates, forms the basis of an explicit or notional fund that can then be used to calculate the amount due under an additional premium provision.

An example, appropriate for a finite risk insurance policy, might look like this:

=== Loss experience account ===
A notional loss experience account will be created at the Inception Date, for use in evaluating amounts due under the commutation provision, which shall be updated annually thereafter as of the last day of each calendar year so long as this Policy remains in effect. The notional loss experience account will be determined as follows:

1. Beginning balance; minus
2. Payments of ultimate net loss made by the Insurer as of the immediately preceding loss payment date; plus
3. Interest income on any positive daily balance calculated using an interest rate equal to the one-year treasury rate effective on the inception date (for the first calculation) and effective at each one-year anniversary for each subsequent twelve-month period.

As of the inception date, the beginning balance will be equal to 100 percent of the premium, less brokerage fees, less the insurer margin. The beginning balance for each subsequent year will be the total of (1) through (3), above, from the prior year's calculation.
