= DFA =

DFA may refer to:

== Business ==
- Dairy Farmers of America, a national milk marketing cooperative in the US
- Design For All (product line), a brand produced for the Target Corporation

== Education ==
- Doctor of Fine Arts, an academic degree
- John S. Davidson Fine Arts Magnet School ("Davidson Fine Arts"), in Augusta, Georgia, U.S.

== Arts and entertainment ==
=== Film ===
- Danmarks Film Akademi, local name for the Danish Film Academy

=== Music ===
- Death from Above 1979, a Toronto-based Canadian alternative rock duo
- DFA (Italian rock band), an Italian progressive rock band from Verona, Italy
- DFA Records, an independent record label and production team

== Sport ==
- Darwin Football Association, an Australian rules football league in Tasmania
- Designated for assignment, a type of player transaction in Major League Baseball
- Dominica Football Association, the governing body of football in Dominica

== Finance ==
- Dimensional Fund Advisors, in finance
- Dodd–Frank Wall Street Reform and Consumer Protection Act, a US federal law signed in 2010
- Dynamic financial analysis, in finance

== Government and politics ==
- Democracy for America, a progressive political action committee in the United States
- Department of Foreign Affairs, an executive office of a sovereign state that helps form its foreign policy
- Partnership for a Drug-Free America, a nonprofit organization

== Mathematics, science, and technology ==
=== Computing ===
- Data-flow analysis, a technique for gathering information about the possible set of values calculated at various points in a computer program
- Deterministic finite automaton, a finite state machine accepting finite strings of symbols
- Differential fault analysis, in cryptography, a type of side channel attack
- Dual factor authentication, a method of computer access control

=== Engineering ===
- Design for All (design philosophy), a design philosophy
- Design for assembly, manufacturing improvement to allow faster or automated assembly or assembly with fewer parts

=== Science ===
- Descent from antiquity, the process of establishing a generation-by-generation descent of living persons
- Direct fluorescent antibody, a medical test
- Humid continental climate in climate classification (Dfa), with hot summers and cold winters and ample precipitation in all seasons

=== Statistics ===
- Detrended fluctuation analysis, a variation of the Hurst Exponent technique, used in the analysis of fractal time series
- Discriminant function analysis, a classification procedure
