= YLT =

YLT may refer to:

- Yo La Tengo, rock band
- Alert Airport, Canada (IATA code YLT)
- Young's Literal Translation of the Bible
- Your Local Time Zone, used by Internet servers that know your current location
- Year loss table, a data format used in catastrophe risk modelling
