= ILW =

ILW may refer to:

- Industry loss warranty, a type of reinsurance contract used in the insurance industry
- Intermediate-level waste, a type of nuclear waste that contains higher amounts of radioactivity
