= OLW =

OLW could refer to:

- Centennial Station, Olympia, Washington, United States; Amtrak station code OLW
- Office Live Workspace The online collaboration tool.
- Oldham Werneth railway station, England; National Rail station code OLW
- Industry Loss Warranties or Original Loss Warranty
- Our Lady of Walsingham
- OLW (company), a Swedish snack producer, formerly Old London Wasa
- Open Live Writer Desktop blog-publishing application.
