= Financial reinsurance =

Financial reinsurance (or fin re) is a form of reinsurance which is focused more on capital management than on risk transfer. In the non-life insurance segment of the insurance industry this class of transactions is often referred to as finite reinsurance.

One of the particular difficulties of running an insurance company is that its financial results - and hence its profitability - tend to be uneven from one year to the next. Since insurance companies generally want to produce consistent results, they may be attracted to ways of hoarding this year's profit to pay for next year's possible losses (within the constraints of the applicable standards for financial reporting). Financial reinsurance is one means by which insurance companies can "smooth" their results.

A pure 'fin re' contract for a non-life insurer tends to cover a multi-year period, during which the premium is held and invested by the reinsurer. It is returned to the ceding company - minus a pre-determined profit margin for the reinsurer - either when the period has elapsed, or when the ceding company suffers a loss. 'Fin re' therefore differs from conventional reinsurance because most of the premium is returned whether there is a loss or not: little or no risk-transfer has taken place.

In the life insurance segment, fin re is more usually used as a way for the reinsurer to provide financing to a life insurance company, much like a loan except that the reinsurer accepts some risk on the portfolio of business reinsured under the fin re contract. Repayment of the fin re is usually linked to the profit profile of the business reinsured and therefore typically takes a number of years. Fin re is used in preference to a plain loan because repayment is conditional on the future profitable performance of the business reinsured such that, in some regimes, it does not need to be recognised as a liability for published solvency reporting.

== History ==
'Fin re' has been around since at least the 1960s, when Lloyd's syndicates started sending money overseas as reinsurance premium for what were then called 'roll-overs' - multi-year contracts with specially-established vehicles in tax-light jurisdictions such as the Cayman Islands. These deals were legal and approved by the UK tax-authorities. However they fell into disrepute after some years, partly because their tax-avoiding motivation became obvious, and partly because of a few cases where the overseas funds were siphoned-off or simply stolen.

More recently, the high-profile bankruptcy of the HIH group of insurance companies in Australia revealed that highly questionable transactions had been propping-up the balance-sheet for some years prior to failure. As of June 2006, General Re and others are being sued by the HIH liquidator in connection with the fraudulent practices.

In the life segment, fin re has been widely used in Europe.

== Objective ==
The primary objective of financial reinsurance is the achievement of a specific business goal like:

- Improve the level and timing of earnings
- Improve the stability of earnings
- Assist in financing acquisitions or joint ventures
- Efficient tax management
- Efficient allocation of income or capital between entities

== Fin Re for Life Insurers ==
=== Regulator's perspective ===
When looking at the financial position of a Life insurer, the company's assets and liabilities are measured. The difference is called the 'free assets' of the company. The greater the free assets relative to the liabilities, the more 'solvent' the company is deemed to be.

There are different ways of measuring assets and liabilities - it depends on who is looking. The regulator, who is interested in ensuring that insurance companies remain solvent so that they can meet their liabilities to policyholders, tends to underestimate assets and overestimate liabilities.

In taking this conservative perspective, one of the steps taken is to effectively ignore future profits. On the one hand this makes sense - it's not prudent to anticipate future profits. On the other hand, for an entire portfolio of policies, although some may lapse - statistically we can rely on a number to still be around to contribute to the company's future profits.

Future profits can thus be seen to be an inadmissible asset - an asset which may not (from the regulator's point of view, anyway) be taken into account. (Current developments, particularly Solvency 2 in Europe, will likely base solvency tests on marked to market assets and liabilities, thereby including some value for future profits. Solvency 2 looks more like banks' Value at risk.)

=== Banker's perspective ===
If a bank were to give the insurer a loan, the insurer's assets would increase by the amount of the loan, but their liabilities would increase by the same amount plus interest (extra liabilities) - because they owe that money back to the bank.

With both assets and liabilities increasing by the same amount, the free assets remain unchanged. This is generally a sensible thing, but it's not what financial reinsurance is aiming for. However, if there is deflation, the liabilities, assets and free assets increase in real value. Thus, deflation expands balance sheets.

=== Reinsurer's perspective ===
In setting up a financial reinsurance treaty, the reinsurer will provide capital (there are a number of ways of doing this, discussed below). In return, the insurer will pay the capital back over time. The key here is to ensure that repayments only come out of surplus emerging from the reinsured block of business. The benefit of this surplus-limitation comes from the fact that in the regulatory accounts there is no value ascribed to future profits - which means the liability to repay the reinsurer is made from a series of payments which are deemed to be zero.

The impact is that there is an increase in assets (from the financing), but no increase in liabilities. In other words, financial reinsurance increases the company's free assets.

== Different accounting regimes ==
Financial reinsurance is generally intended to impact the regulatory balance sheet on the premise that that balance sheet provides a distorted view of a company's solvency otherwise. Many financial reinsurance transactions, particularly for life insurers, have little impact on GAAP accounts and shareholder-reported profits.

Over the 2004-2006 period a number of financial or finite reinsurance transactions attracted regulatory scrutiny, notably from New York Attorney General Eliot Spitzer, due to the concern that their primary result was to distort and manage accounting presentation rather than to transfer risk. In particular, a transaction between AIG and General Re through which the former buttressed its reserves was identified as transferring insufficient risk, and this review led to management changes at both companies. Accountants, regulators and other constituencies proposed a variety of tests for such transactions.

== See also ==
- Reinsurance
- Alternative risk transfer
- Captive insurance
