= Design For All =

Design For All may refer to:

- Design for All (in ICT), Design for All in the field of Information and Communication Technologies
- Design for All (design philosophy)
- Design For All (product line), a range of designer products made available at discount retailers by the Target Corporation
- Design for All, a design philosophy targeting the use of products, services and systems by as many people as possible without the need for adaptation
