= Industry loss warranty =

Industry loss warranties (ILWs), are a type of reinsurance contract used in the insurance industry through which one party will purchase protection based on the total loss arising from an event to the entire insurance industry above a certain trigger level rather than their own losses.

For example, the buyer of a "$100 million limit US Wind ILW attaching at $20 billion" will pay a premium to a protection writer (generally a reinsurer but sometimes a hedge fund) and in return will receive $100 million if total losses to the insurance industry from a single US hurricane exceed $20 billion. The industry loss ($20 billion in this case) is often referred to as the "trigger". The amount of protection offered by the contract ($100 million in this case) is referred to as the "limit".

ILWs could also be constructed based on an index not linked to insurance industry losses. For example, Professor Lawrence A. Cunningham of George Washington University suggests adapting similar mechanisms to the risks that large auditing firms face in cases asserting massive securities law damages.

These agreements are usually documented as reinsurance contracts between the parties but can also be described as financial derivatives. If so, in addition to the industry loss trigger the contract will include an "ultimate net loss clause" which specifies that the protection buyer must demonstrate that they have lost a specified amount as well. ILWs are sometimes referred to as original loss warranties or Original Market Loss Warranties, but this usage is becoming increasingly rare.

== History ==
The first contracts of this type were traded in the 1980s. This market remained fairly small (though influential in price setting for reinsurance as these contracts are more consistent than most reinsurance treaties) through Hurricane Katrina. The entry of many hedge funds into the market (for which ILWs are a preferred trading vehicle) along with the breakdown of the retrocessional reinsurance market (reinsurance for reinsurers) led to the growth of the ILW market.

The ILW market has no recognized exchange or clearing source to track volumes. Size estimates range from $2 billion to $10 billion outstanding (Aon plc, Nephila). The pre-Katrina market in terms of outstanding contracts was likely near the low end of that range and the post Katrina market is likely to have moved upward within that range.

== Loss measurement ==
In the United States the Property Claims Services, a division of the Insurance Services Office (ISO), is generally the source for industry loss estimates for perils. SIGMA, a division of Swiss Re, is often the source for such losses outside the US, with Munich Re's NatCAT Service appearing more and more often on ex-US business.

== Common contracts and market dynamics ==
The benchmark contract for the market for a number of years around Hurricane Katrina was $20 billion US Wind and Quake. A number of other US Wind and Quake zones as well as Japanese Quake and European windstorm and various second event coverages also trade in the market.

Many catastrophe bonds are triggered by industry-based triggers and trade with reference to pricing in the ILW markets.

These contracts are often negotiated directly between parties. In addition, brokers including Willis and Access Re publish estimated bid and offer levels and attempt to arrange trades. Catastrophe bond traders including Swiss Re and Goldman Sachs may also trade these instruments.

== Types ==
- Live cat contract - are contracts traded while an event is in progress—usually a hurricane approaching land.
- Dead cat contract - are traded on an event that had already occurred, but for which the total amount of industry loss is not yet known. Some market participants refer to contracts against perils which are out of season (for example, hurricane contracts outside of hurricane season) as dead cats.
- Back-up covers - provide protection for events that occur following the occurrence of a catastrophe.

== See also ==
- Alternative risk transfer
- Reinsurance
- Catastrophe bond
- Reinsurance sidecar
