= Weather risk management =

Weather risk management is a type of risk management done by organizations to address potential financial losses caused by unusual weather.

== Overview ==
Energy, agriculture, transportation, construction, municipalities, school districts, travel, food processors, retail sales and real estate are all examples of industries whose operations and profits can be significantly affected by the weather. Unexpected weather events can cause significant financial losses. For example, unusually mild winters diminish consumer demand for heating and erode the profit margins for utility companies. Weather information and forecasts utilized in risk management decision making is often referred to as meteorological intelligence and offered by companies such as Metswift.

The weather risk market makes it possible to manage the financial impact of weather through risk transfer instruments based on a defined weather element, such as temperature, rain, snow, wind, etc. Weather risk management is a way for organizations to limit their financial exposure to disruptive weather events. By making a payment (a "premium") to a separate company that will assume the financial weather risk for them, an organization essentially is buying a type of insurance - the company assuming the risk will pay the buyer a pre-set amount of money which will correspond to the loss or cost increase caused by the disruptive weather.

Catastrophic weather events such as hurricanes are typically managed through traditional insurance contracts that pay based on indemnity loss. Insurance is a heavily regulated industry with specific requirements and qualification criteria. Due to the indemnity nature of insurance, actual loss must be proven to an insurance carrier before the payment can be processed. In contrast, financial loss such as erosion of margin, portfolio loss or increased expenses usually do not qualify for insurance payouts. Financial instruments such as derivative transactions can provide more flexible and customized risk management opportunities than the typical insurance contracts as they are priced and settled on the parameters of measured weather rather than the associated financial loss.

== Market participants ==
A wide range of capital providers make markets in weather risk. To date the weather risk management trading market is primarily made up of dedicated weather trading operations, such as Nephila Capital Ltd, Galileo Weather Risk Management Advisors LCC, Swiss Re, RenRe, and Coriolis Capital, who execute trade orders in weather or weather-contingent commodity trades, the trading desks of financial institutions and utilities, such as Susquahanna Energy and Aquila who hedge their own risk as well as speculative trades for a merchant portfolio, professional commodity traders, such as RJO and hedge and private equity funds such as Tudor Capital. Transactions can be effected over-the-counter (OTC) or on commodity exchanges such as The Chicago Mercantile Exchange (CME). Still other operations, such as Storm Exchange, Inc(Note: Storm Exchange is now defunct. and WeatherBill (WeatherBill is no longer serving markets outside of Agriculture), privately held eWeatherRisk now provide corporate and municipal clients with the necessary financial context to gauge the impact of the weather on profit and loss before executing trades either OTC or through the CME.

== Regulation ==
=== United States ===
In the US, the Commodity Exchange Act, Section 5d establishes weather in a category of market exempt from Commission oversight.

Rule 36.2 defines those commodities that are eligible to trade on an exempt board of trade as commodities having:

1. A nearly inexhaustible deliverable supply;
2. A deliverable supply that is sufficiently large, and a cash market sufficiently liquid, to render any contract traded on the commodity highly unlikely to be susceptible to the threat of manipulation;
3. No cash market.

The Commodity Futures Trading Commission determined that weather indices are eligible to be traded on EBOTs by order dated May 30, 2002.

== Tax treatment ==
=== Accounting for OTC weather derivatives as a hedge ===
Companies that are subject to public disclosure to regulators or their shareholders must demonstrate that the purchase or a sale of a derivatives is true and fair hedge, not speculation. SFAS 133 and IAS provide guidelines on the steps that are required. FAS 133 Accounting for Weather Derivatives: For U.S. accounting standards, Over-the-Counter (OTC) weather derivative transactions can generally get an exemption under derivatives & hedging disclosure rules of Financial Accounting Standard No. 133 section 10 for non-exchange contracts settled on climatic variables, although specific structures and applications have to be assessed for each company environment. All written non–exchanged–traded option–based weather derivatives contracts should be carried at fair value with subsequent changes in fair value reported in current earnings.

=== Accounting for Exchange traded and speculative weather derivatives ===
When they are standardized and traded on exchanges, weather derivatives will fall within the scope of SFAS 133. EITF Issue No 99–2 "Accounting for weather derivatives" provides guidance on accounting for weather derivatives that are not exchange–traded. Entities that enter into speculatives or trading non–exchange derivatives contracts should apply the intrinsic method.

== See also ==
- Adapt-n
- Alternative risk transfer
- CelsiusPro
- The Climate Corporation
- Dupont Pioneer
- EDF Energy
- Datameteo Weather Risk
- MeteoGroup
- Meteoprotect
- Weather derivative
- Wx Risk Global
