= Pandemic Emergency Financing Facility =

The Pandemic Emergency Financing Facility (abbreviated as PEF, and also known as Pandemic Bonds) is a controversial financing mechanism intended to assist governments and aid agencies with the management of a pandemic outbreak. It is provided by the World Bank, which raised the majority of the money by issuing $320m in bonds (which can be considered as a type of catastrophe bond) and $105m in swaps to private investors,

Additional funding was provided by approximately $190m in donations from three countries and the World Bank's International Development Association.

Jim Yong Kim, the president of the World Bank at the time the bonds were issued, described the programme as "leveraging our capital market expertise to serve the world's poorest people."

== Bonds ==
A total of $330m of bonds and swaps were sold to private investors in June 2017 with a maturity date of 15 July 2020, although it can be extended by one year. The two tranches of the security offering pay annual coupons of 6.5% and 11.1% above Libor respectively. The interest paid is funded by the governments of Germany and Japan.

The bonds were issued in two tranches: Class A (of which $225m was issued) only applies to pandemic flu and coronavirus, and is subject to a higher threshold of deaths before money will be paid out, making it a lower risk. Class B ($95m issued) has a higher risk.

The bonds are intended to transfer pandemic risk away from developing countries and reimburse them while an outbreak is taking place. This differs from traditional reinsurance, which pays out after an event has happened in order to replenish insurers' capital. It added to the complexity of designing and marketing the bonds, as investors had to be comfortable with the parametric triggers on which the pay-outs depended.

When a qualifying pandemic occurs, the invested capital can be paid out to affected countries, rather being returned to investors. Among the parameters governing whether or not the bond is triggered are: the number of IBRD or IDA countries affected; the number of cases in each of those countries; the number of deaths; the percentage of confirmed cases to total cases, including suspected; and the growth rate of cases. The conditions to trigger the bond must be in place for at least 12 weeks after the designated start of the event for payouts to happen. After that, they must be in place on a rolling 12-week basis.

On 17 April 2020, the first payout for the PEF bonds was triggered by the COVID-19 pandemic. A total of nearly $196 million was paid out from the bonds and swaps, comprising 100% of Class B, and 16.67% of Class A - the maximum possible payout for a coronavirus outbreak.

In 2019, the World Bank indicated that they were planning on continuing the PEF programme by issuing a new set of bonds, PEF 2.0, starting in May 2020.

== Payouts ==
There are two "windows" of payouts which can be made by the PEF to countries or aid agencies in the case of a pandemic: the insurance window and the cash window.

=== Insurance window ===
The insurance window is backed by the bonds sold, and can pay out a total of $425 million. It has more stringent criteria required to trigger a payout than the cash window. The insurance window covers diseases caused by:

- Pandemic flu (maximum payout $275m)
- Filovirus (maximum payout $150m)
- Coronavirus (maximum payout $195.83m)
- Rift Valley fever, Lassa Fever, or Crimean–Congo hemorrhagic fever (maximum payout $75m)

With the exception of pandemic flu, payouts are layered, with a system of thresholds used to determine the amount payable.

=== Cash window ===
The cash window is a short term cash injection backed by donated funds. It is governed by a steering body of countries which contributed the donations. The cash window has a capacity to pay out up to $64m, although this may fluctuate based on the funds already issued and donations received. It provides coverage of all the pathogens covered by the insurance window, as well as new pathogens which are not already epidemically transmitted.

== Criticism ==
The PEF has been widely criticised for providing generous returns to investors while making it too difficult to access funding during disease outbreaks, especially during the early stages of an outbreak when swift action is crucial. It was described by the former World Bank chief economist Lawrence Summers as "an embarrassing mistake". Social scientists have provided measured critiques.

Critics argue that the money spent on the PEF could be better used for increasing surveillance, diagnostics, and response capabilities for outbreaks.

=== Kivu Ebola epidemic ===
During the Kivu Ebola epidemic, which resulted in over 2,000 deaths, the PEF had paid out only $31 million by the 13th month of the outbreak, while having paid a total of $75.5 million in premiums to bondholders. The conditions of bonds were not triggered by this outbreak, so investors did not lose any money; the money paid out by the PEF came from the donation component of the fund.

The terms of the bonds were criticised because even the higher-risk Class B bonds required at least 20 deaths in a second country before money could be released – a situation which is rare even in severe Ebola outbreaks due to the political geography of the areas of Africa prone to outbreaks of Ebola.

=== COVID-19 pandemic ===
During the COVID-19 pandemic, the PEF again came under criticism for having terms which were too stringent; the first tranche of money was not eligible to be released until 12 weeks after the start of the outbreak, despite the other conditions being satisfied, which prevented the money from being used to contain the disease during the crucial early stages.

The payout conditions were triggered on 17 April 2020, nearly four months after the outbreak was first identified.

== See also ==
- Central Emergency Response Fund
