= Weather derivative =

Financial instrument

Weather derivatives are financial instruments that can be used by organizations or individuals as part of a risk management strategy to reduce risk associated with adverse or unexpected weather conditions. Weather derivatives are index-based instruments that usually use observed weather data at a weather station to create an index on which a payout can be based. This index could be total rainfall over a relevant period—which may be of relevance for a hydro-generation business—or the number where the minimum temperature falls below zero which might be relevant for a farmer protecting against frost damage.

As is the case with parametric weather insurance, there is no proof of loss provision. Unlike "indemnity" insurance-based cover, there is no need to demonstrate that a loss has been suffered, however an indemnity insurance policy for weather is a rarely utilized instrument. Settlement is objective, based on the final value of the chosen weather index over the chosen period. If a payout is due, it is usually made in a matter of a few days with the settlement period being defined in the contract. See Exotic derivatives.

== Overview of uses ==
Farmers can use weather derivatives to hedge against poor harvests caused by failing rains during the growing period, excessive rain during harvesting, high winds in case of plantations or temperature variabilities in case of greenhouse crops; theme parks may want to insure against rainy weekends during peak summer seasons; and gas and power companies may use heating degree days (HDD) or cooling degree days (CDD) contracts to smooth earnings. A sports event managing company may wish to hedge the loss by entering into a weather derivative contract because if it rains the day of the sporting event, fewer tickets will be sold.

Heating degree days are one of the most common index types for weather derivative evaluation. Typical terms for an HDD contract could be: for the November to March period, for each day when the daily mean temperature falls below a reference point (65 degrees Fahrenheit in the U.S., or, 18 degrees Celsius outside the U.S.), a cumulative count is kept of the daily departures from the reference temperature. Such an accumulation can be the basis for a derivative contract which might be structured as an option (call or put) or as a "swap" that is an agreement to pay or to receive payment.

== History ==
The first weather derivative deal was in July 1996 when Aquila Energy structured a dual-commodity hedge for Consolidated Edison (ConEd). The transaction involved ConEd's purchase of electric power from Aquila for the month of August. The price of the power was agreed, and a weather clause was embedded into the contract. This clause stipulated that Aquila would pay ConEd a rebate if August turned out to be cooler than expected. The measurement of this was referenced to Cooling Degree Days (CDDs) measured at New York City's Central Park weather station. If total CDDs were from 0 to 10% below the expected 320, the company received no discount to the power price, but if total CDDs were 11 to 20% below normal, ConEd would receive a $16,000 discount. Other discounted levels were worked in for even greater departures from normal.

Weather derivatives slowly began trading over-the-counter in 1997. As the market for these products grew, the Chicago Mercantile Exchange (CME) introduced the first exchange-traded weather futures contracts (and corresponding options), in 1999. The CME currently lists weather derivative contracts for 24 cities in the United States, eleven in Europe, six in Canada, three in Australia and three in Japan. Most of these financial instruments track cooling degree days or heating degree days, but other products track snowfall and rainfall in at ten separate U.S. locations. The CME Hurricane Index, an innovation developed by the reinsurance industry provides contracts that are based on a formula derived from the wind speed and radius of named storms at the point of U.S. landfall.

Enron Corporation was one of the first to explore weather derivatives, through its EnronOnline unit.

In an Opalesque video interview, Nephila Capital's Barney Schauble described how some hedge funds treat weather derivatives as an investment class. Counterparties such as utilities, farming conglomerates, individual companies and insurance companies are essentially looking to hedge their exposure through weather derivatives, and funds have become a sophisticated partner in providing this protection. There has also been a shift over the last few years from primarily fund of funds investment in weather risk, to more direct investment for investors looking for non-correlated items for their portfolio. Weather derivatives provide a pure non-correlated alternative to traditional financial markets.

An online weather derivative exchange Massive Rainfall was created in 2014 and has been used to bet or hedge on specific temperatures, wind speeds and rainfall for specific days in select cities, however it appears to be only an educational tool for practice accounts in a non-existent currency.

== Valuation ==
There is no standard model for valuing weather derivatives similar to the Black–Scholes formula for pricing European style equity option and similar derivatives. That is because the underlying asset of the weather derivative is non-tradeable which violates a number of key assumptions of the Black–Scholes Model. Typically weather derivatives are priced in a number of ways:

=== Business pricing ===
Business pricing requires the company utilizing weather derivative instruments to understand how its financial performance is affected by adverse weather conditions across a variety of outcomes (i.e. obtain a utility curve with respect to particular weather variables). Then the user can determine how much he/she is willing to pay in order to protect his/her business from those conditions in case they occurred based on his/her cost-benefit analysis and appetite for risk. In this way, a business can obtain a "guaranteed weather" for the period in question, largely reducing the expenses/revenue variations due to weather. Alternatively, an investor seeking a certain level of return for a certain level of risk can determine what price he is willing to pay for bearing particular outcome risk related to a particular weather instrument.

=== Historical pricing (Burn analysis) ===
The historical payout of the derivative is computed to find the expectation. The method is very quick and simple, but does not produce reliable estimates and could be used only as a rough guideline. It does not incorporate a variety of statistical and physical features characteristic of the weather system.

=== Index modelling ===
This approach requires building a model of the underlying index, i.e. the one upon which the derivative value is determined (for example monthly/seasonal cumulative heating degree days). The simplest way to model the index is just to model the distribution of historical index outcomes. We can adopt parametric or non-parametric distributions. For monthly cooling and heating degree days, assuming a normal distribution is usually warranted. The predictive power of such a model is rather limited. A better result can be obtained by modelling the index generating process on a finer scale. In the case of temperature contracts, a model of the daily average (or min and max) temperature time series can be built. The daily temperature (or rain, snow, wind, etc.) model can be built using common statistical time series models (i.e. ARMA or Fourier transform in the frequency domain) purely based only on the features displayed in the historical time series of the index. A more sophisticated approach is to incorporate some physical intuition/relationships into our statistical models based on spatial and temporal correlation between weather occurring in various parts of the ocean-atmosphere system around the world (for example, we can incorporate the effects of El Niño on temperatures and rainfall).

=== Physical models of the weather ===
We can utilize the output of numerical weather prediction models based on physical equations describing relationships in the weather system. Their predictive power tends to be less than, or similar to, purely statistical models beyond time horizons of 10–15 days. Ensemble forecasts are especially appropriate for weather derivative pricing within the contract period of a monthly temperature derivative. However, individual members of the ensemble need to be 'dressed' (for example, with Gaussian kernels estimated from historical performance) before a reasonable probabilistic forecast can be obtained.

=== Mixture of statistical and physical models ===
A superior approach for modelling daily or monthly weather variable time series is to combine statistical and physical weather models using time-horizon varying weight which are obtained after optimization of those based on historical out-of-sample evaluation of the combined model scheme performance.

== Accounting treatment ==
In contrast to a weather insurance policy and because of its unique nature, the accounting for a weather derivative falls under specialized rules, most notably the Financial Accounting Standards Board's (FASB) Statement of Financial Accounting Standards #133 (SFAS #133). Because of this rigorous accounting and taxations treatment, any party considering the transaction of a weather derivative should seek the advice of both an accountant familiar with SFAS #133 and the required documentation, as well as a tax attorney.

== See also ==
- Weather Risk Management
- The Climate Corporation
- Alternative risk transfer
- Fixed bill
