= Cell captive =

Captive insurance structures can be classified into three main categories: Single Parent Captives, Group Captives, and Core Cell Captive Insurance Companies, also known as Cell Captives or Core Cell Companies.

Cell Captives are entities consisting of a core and an indefinite number of cell entities which are kept legally separate from each other. Each cell has dedicated assets and liabilities ascribed to it, and the assets of an individual cell cannot be used to meet the liabilities of any other cell. A core cell company may also have non-core assets, which may be made available to meet liabilities that cannot be attributed to another single cell. Depending on the specific structure and operation of the core cell company, it can create and issue cell shares with respect to any of the cells. There may be a common board of directors for all cells, or cells may have their own unique board.

Depending on the domicile of the core cell company its organizational structure may take on the characteristics of one or more of the following, discussed detail below:

- Rent-a-Captive
- Segregated Account Company
- Segregated Portfolio Company
- Protected Cell Company
- Special Purpose Vehicle
- Serial Entity Company
- Incorporated Cell Company

== Organizational Structures ==
=== Protected Cell Company ===
Various regulatory authorities have slight variations in the definition of what constitutes a Protected Cell Company (PCC).

PCCs were originally developed in Guernsey in 1997, and now exist in other territories such as Malta, Jersey, Cayman Islands, Irish Republic, Bermuda, various U.S. locations, and other domiciles around the globe.

Guernsey developed the concept of the Protected Cell Company (PCC) in 1997 to provide a solution for companies who wanted to take advantage of the risk management solutions offered by a traditional single parent captive insurance but who did not want to establish a captive of their own. A PCC is its own legal entity which is a trait it shares with a traditional insurance company. However, unlike a traditional insurance company the structure of a PCC is subdivided into the core, which contains the capital for the whole of the entity, and individual cells, which have the option to be capitalized individually and separate from the core or use the core funds to meet its capitalization requirements. One of the key benefits associated with a PCC facility is that the assets of each individual cell are statutorily segregated to ensure that a claim against one cell cannot be covered by the assets of another cell.

The IRS defines a PCC as a legal entity formed by a Sponsoring Organization under the laws of a specific domicile. Under the statute of a given state domicile then entity may be organized under a corporate or unincorporated entity statute. The assets of each cell are segregated from the assets of any other cell. The cell may issue insurance or annuity contracts, reinsure such contracts, or facilitate the securitization of obligations of a sponsoring insurance company.

The UK office of HM Revenue & Customs defines a PCC as a type of corporate organization restricted to the financial services sector, in particular insurance, located in an offshore domicile; they are sometimes called "divided companies" or "segregated asset companies". A defining feature of these companies is that they contain units called "cells". These "cells" can be separately owned and their assets and liabilities are segregated from the assets and liabilities of other cells. This structure enables a cell to be run as if it were a separate company although it remains part of the larger corporate body, the PCC itself which is a single legal entity.

The introduction of PCC legislation has proved of particular interest to the promoters of association captives, international group companies with numerous autonomous subsidiaries and insurers writing long term business who wish to separate the life funds relating to different policyholders into separate cells within a PCC. In addition, the PCC structure enables general and long term insurance business to be written in different cells of the same PCC provided these cells are not both reliant upon the core assets for solvency purposes.

PCCs are playing an important part in the scope, design, implementation, funding, and financing of strategic risk financing programs; they are enhancing currently established programs and serving as the catalyst for the development and implementation of new structures blending finance, insurance, and risk management.

=== Special Purpose Vehicles ===
A more recent development has been the use of PCCs as Special Purpose Vehicles (SPVs) to facilitate the development of capital market transactions into insurance transactions or their use as risk transfer vehicles to enable the securitization of future income streams.

=== Incorporated Protected Cell Company ===
•An Incorporated Cell Company (“ICC”) is a company which has the power to establish incorporated cells as part of its corporate structure. Like a PCC, an ICC may comprise any number of incorporated cells. However, unlike a protected cell of a PCC an incorporated cell has many of the attributes of a non-cellular company. Each incorporated cell has its own board of directors, its own memorandum and articles of incorporation and each is a separate legal entity which must register with the governing regulatory body.

•Since each incorporated cell is a separate legal entity, an incorporated cell can enter into transactions with another incorporated cell. This is in marked contrast to the cells of a PCC. However, although each Cell has its own board of directors, the Law requires that the identity of the board of directors of an ICC is the same as the directors of each Cell of that ICC. Similarly the secretary of an ICC must also be the secretary of each of its Cells.

•The rationale behind the creation of the ICC was to provide additional protection to creditors. Since each incorporated cell is a separately registered legal entity the segregation of assets within the ICC is strengthened. The fact that each incorporated cell is a separate legal entity also provides greater flexibility in relation to the ability to convert, migrate and amalgamate incorporated cells.

•ICC’s are appealing for two main reasons. They enable a form of corporate group structure to be created but with lower administration costs than a traditional group of stand-alone non-cellular companies. They may also be regarded as providing even more robust segregation of assets and liabilities than a PCC because the creation of incorporated cells is a more formal process than the creation of protected cells and segregation of the assets of an incorporated cell is slightly less dependent upon the actions of management.

== Regulatory Oversight ==
=== U.S. Internal Revenue Service (IRS) Material ===
IRS Revenue Ruling 2008 – 8: https://www.irs.gov/irb/2008-05_IRB/ar05.html

A discussion on how arrangements between an individual cell and its owner are analyzed for purposes of determining whether there is adequate risk shifting and risk distribution to constitute insurance.

== References and Links ==
- International Association of Insurance Supervisors http://www.iaisweb.org/
- Captive.com – http://www.captive.com/Showcase.html
- Captive Insurance Times.com – http://www.captiveinsurancetimes.com
