= Reinsurance sidecar =

Type of insurance

Reinsurance sidecars, conventionally referred to as "sidecars", are financial structures that are created to allow investors to take on the risk and return of a group of insurance policies (a "book of business") written by an insurer or reinsurer (henceforth re/insurer) and earn the risk and return that arises from that business. A re/insurer will only pay ("cede") the premiums associated with a book of business to such an entity if the investors place sufficient funds in the vehicle to ensure that it can meet claims if they arise. Typically, the liability of investors is limited to these funds. These structures have become quite prominent in the aftermath of Hurricane Katrina as a vehicle for re/insurers to add risk-bearing capacity, and for investors to participate in the potential profits resulting from sharp price increases in re/insurance over the four quarters following Katrina. An earlier and smaller generation of sidecars were created after 9/11 for the same purpose.

== Precedents ==
Sidecars have precedents in the reinsurance market under the name "quota-share reinsurance" — a common arrangement both historically and currently. In such an agreement, a re/insurer agrees to cede to the quota-share reinsurer a percentage of all premiums arising from a book of business in exchange for the reinsurer bearing the same percentage liability for losses. The quota-share reinsurer pays a "ceding commission" to compensate the ceding company for its expenses. The ceding commission typically also includes a profit allowance, which increases in proportion to the expected profitability of the business. Such reinsurance treaties enable ceding companies to write more business than they could bear based on their own capital and to earn a certain amount of fee-based income (through the ceding commission). Quota-share reinsurers act as insurance wholesalers, allowing them to earn a return on capital without creating primary insurance distribution. Among other specialist reinsurers, Lloyd's of London "names" accept such business, placing the resources of individual and firms at risk for books of business written by professional underwriters and agents.

== Early sidecars: reinsurance joint ventures ==
Re/insurers have occasionally created joint ventures through which multiple parties place capital at the disposal of one or more expert underwriters for the same reasons. The earliest sidecars were created in Bermuda in the 1990s in such a fashion, and included Top Layer Re and OpCat, both of which placed capacity under the control of Renaissance Re on the part of other re/insurers (Overseas Partners, State Farm).

== Market growth following 9-11 and Hurricane Katrina ==
In the years following 9-11, the idea of raising funds from capital markets investors in addition to re/insurers to support quota-shares arose and a handful of such ventures were consummated (Olympus, DaVinci, Rockridge). These were the first true sidecars, and were a natural outgrowth of the development of re/insurance as an asset class in the form of catastrophe bonds.

Following Hurricane Katrina, the sidecar idea became very prominent among investors because it was seen as a way to participate in the risk/return of the higher-priced ("hard") reinsurance market without investing in either existing reinsurers (who might have liabilities from the past that would undermine returns) or new reinsurers ("newcos" that would have a lengthy and expensive "ramp up" period). Three such entities were up and running by year-end 2005:

Name	Capital raised	Re/insurer
Flatiron	$840m	Arch Capital
Blue Ocean	$355m	Montpelier Re
Cyrus	$550m	XL Capital

These entities have been created since 2006:

Name	Capital raised	Re/insurer	Type of business
Petrel	$200m	Validus	Marine and energy reinsurance
Kaith/K5	$370m	Hannover Re	Several lines of insurance and reinsurance
Helicon	$330m	White Mountains Re	Property catastrophe reinsurance
BayPoint	$150m	Harbor Point	Selected short-tailed lines of business
Timicuan/RPP	$70m	Renaissance Re	Reinstatement premium protection
Starbound	$315m	Renaissance Re	Florida treaty business
Sector Re	$220m	Swiss Re	Property catastrophe and aviation reinsurance
Castlepoint Re	$265m	Tower Group	Program and specialty insurance
Monte Fort Re	$60m	Flagstone Re	Peak zone and ILW (industry loss warranty) coverage
Sirocco	$95m	Lancashire Re	Gulf of Mexico offshore energy
Concord	$730m	AIG	US commercial property business
MaRI	$400m	Marsh / ACE	US commercial property

Together with supplementary capital raises at Olympus, DaVinci, Blue Ocean and Kaith, this brought the total capital raised to over $4 billion by September 2006 and established sidecars as a major capital raising vehicle for catastrophe risk.

By year-end 2006, it began to appear as though supply and demand in the reinsurance and catastrophe bond markets had achieved balance at the prevailing price level. The market began to "soften" (fall in price), particularly following the decision by the State of Florida to expand the size of the reinsurance protection offered by the Florida Hurricane Catastrophe Fund by at least $12 billion in January 2007. Creation of new sidecars slowed markedly in the first half of 2007 in consequence, with only one transaction being closed that included an equity offering (Starbound II, itself in some respects as much a rollover of Starbound I as a new transaction). The sidecar market continued to be active, however, with three different issuers accessing the bank loan market for debt to leverage their own equity: Hannover Re (Kepler), the Citadel reinsurance companies (Emerson) and State Farm (Merna, primarily a 4(2) bond issuance but in part a bank loan offering).

== Sidecar investments ==
Investors are typically offered debt (generally in the form of bank loans), preferred stock and equity investments in the sidecar. Debt may be rated by the rating agencies, which include Standard & Poor's, Moody's and A. M. Best. Most sidecar debt has been rated in the "BB" category (below investment grade), but some investment grade debt has been issued. In 2007, the rating agencies offered detailed criteria discussions for this type of issuance.

== See also ==
- Catastrophe bonds
- Reinsurance
- Alternative risk transfer
- Captive insurance
