= Meteorological intelligence =

Meteorological intelligence is information measured, gathered, compiled, exploited, analyzed and disseminated by meteorologists, climatologists and hydrologists to characterize the current state and/or predict the future state of the atmosphere at a given location and time. Meteorological intelligence is a subset of environmental intelligence and is synonymous with the term weather intelligence.

The earliest known use of the term "meteorological intelligence" in a written document dates to 1854 on pg. 168 of the Eighth Annual Report of the Board of Regents of the Smithsonian Institution. This report discusses the Smithsonian Institution's initiative to transmit meteorological intelligence via telegraph lines. An early reference to "meteorological intelligence" in England dates an 1866 issue of The Edinburgh Review which was a prominent Scottish journal during the 19th century (Reeve 1866, pg. 75).

Another documented, early use of the term dates to 1874 in a historical compilation entitled, "The American Historical Record" (Lossing 1874, pg. 125). In this book, Lossing uses the term to refer to weather observations transmitted over telegraph lines for the purpose of studying the nature of storms with the ultimate goal of enhancing public safety through the issuance of storm warnings. This mission was carried out by the Army Signal Service starting in the 1870s who was responsible for communication (via telegraph) of technical intelligence for the army as well as "meteorological intelligence" for the general welfare of the country (Ingersoll 1879, pg. 156).

From the viewpoint of the intelligence community, the term meteorological intelligence is more limited in its use referring to the use of clandestine or technical means to learn about environmental conditions over enemy territory (Shulsky and Schmitt 2002) as in the North Atlantic weather war. In the military intelligence context, weather information is often referred to as meteorological or environmental intelligence (Hinsley 1990, pg. 420; Platt 1957, pg. 14; U.S. Congress, pg. 164).

With regard to private sector meteorology, the term meteorological intelligence is a broad term of art that is primarily associated with observed and forecast weather information provided to decision makers in one of a number of weather sensitive business areas including: Energy, forestry, agriculture, telecommunications, transportation, aviation, entertainment, retail and construction (CMOS 2001, pg. 23) . It is considered a key aspect of weather risk management for the legal and insurance industries.

== See also ==
- Military intelligence
- Business intelligence
- Intelligence (information gathering)
- Weather risk management
