= Dual trigger insurance =

Dual trigger insurance is an insurance (or reinsurance) program where the limit, premium, or retention is linked to one or more contingencies other than insurable hazards. Such contingencies are often external to the buyer, objectively measurable, and uncorrelated with the hazard risk(s) covered under the program. The contingency may include an event-linked trigger associated with the financial performance of the buyer, particularly those performances most closely related to earnings.

Such programs can be used to provide, in effect, insurance that only comes into play in otherwise "bad" years. While often described in theory, these programs are rarely, if ever, implemented.
