= Retrospectively rated insurance =

Retrospectively rated insurance is a type of insurance that uses retrospective rating: a method of establishing a premium on large commercial accounts. The final premium is based on the insured's actual loss experience during the policy term, sometimes subject to a minimum and maximum premium, with the final premium determined by a formula.

Under this plan, the current year's premium is based partially (or wholly) on the current year's losses, although the premium adjustments may take months or years beyond the current year's expiration date. The rating formula is guaranteed in the insurance contract.

Formula: retrospective premium = (converted loss + basic premium) × tax multiplier. Numerous variations of this formula have been developed and are in use.

In Washington, retrospective rating is used by the Department of Labor & Industries to create an incentive for improving workplace safety and lowering the cost of workers' compensation claims.
