= Catastrophe bond =

Risk-linked securities

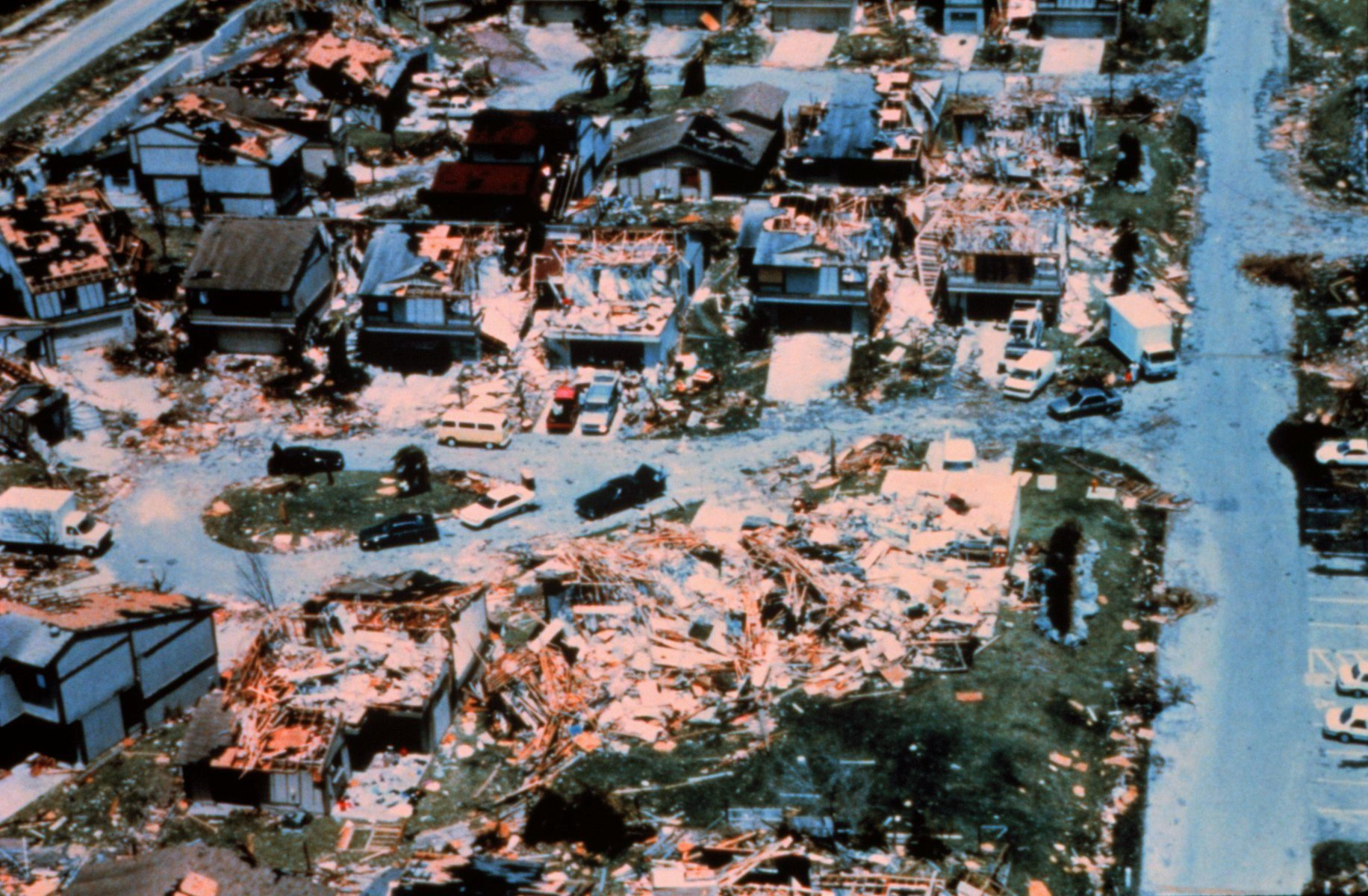
The aftermath of Hurricane Andrew in Lakes by the Bay, Florida.

Catastrophe bonds (also known as cat bonds) are a subset of insurance-linked securities (ILS) that transfer a specified set of risks from a sponsor to investors. If a specified catastrophe occurs, the bond pays the invested principal to the sponsors as a way of funding the recovery from the disaster; otherwise, the principal is returned at maturity to the investors, who are also paid a coupon over the lifetime of the bond.

They were created and first used in the mid-1990s in the aftermath of Hurricane Andrew and the Northridge earthquake. Catastrophe bonds emerged from a need by insurance and reinsurance companies to alleviate some of the risks they would face if a major catastrophe occurred, which would incur damage that they could not cover with the invested premiums. Though present since the 1990s, the increases in disaster risk related to climate change caused many governments and insurance companies to turn to cat bonds when reinsurance is not available or too expensive.

In order to create a bond, an insurance company issues bonds through an investment bank, which are then sold to investors, such as hedge funds or other kinds of investment vehicles. Catastrophe bonds are non-investment grade corporate bonds (roughly equivalent to B or BB) with floating interest rates, and have an average maturity of 3 years with some up to 5 years but are uncommon. The insurance company pays a coupon to the investors and if no catastrophe occurs the principal is paid back at maturity. If a catastrophe occurs, then the principal is lost (the bond defaults) and the insurance company uses this money to pay their claim-holders. The triggers are linked to major natural catastrophes. Catastrophe bonds are typically used by insurers as an alternative to traditional catastrophe reinsurance.

For example, if an insurer has built up a portfolio of risks by insuring properties in Florida, then it might wish to pass some of this risk on so that it can remain solvent after a large hurricane. It could simply purchase traditional catastrophe reinsurance, which would pass the risk on to reinsurers. Or it could sponsor a cat bond, which would pass the risk on to investors. In consultation with an investment bank, it would create a special purpose entity that would issue the cat bond. Investors include hedge funds, ILS-dedicated funds, pension plans, (re)insurance companies, and asset managers. They are often structured as floating-rate bonds whose principal is lost if specified trigger conditions are met.

== History ==
The notion of securitizing catastrophe risks became prominent in the aftermath of Hurricane Andrew, notably in work published by Richard Sandor, Kenneth Froot, and a group of professors at the Wharton School who were seeking vehicles to bring more risk-bearing capacity to the catastrophe reinsurance market. The first experimental transactions were completed in the mid-1990s by AIG, Hannover Re, St. Paul Re, and USAA.

The market grew to $1–2 billion of issuance per year for the 1998–2001 period, and over $2 billion per year following 9/11. Issuance doubled again to a run rate of approximately $4 billion on an annual basis in 2006 following Hurricane Katrina, and was accompanied by the development of reinsurance sidecars. Issuance continued to increase through 2007, despite the passing of the post-Katrina "hard market", as a number of insurers sought diversification of coverage through the market, including State Farm, Allstate, Liberty Mutual, Chubb, and Travelers, along with long-time issuer USAA. Following the Tohoku Earthquake and April 27, 2011 Super Outbreak, issuance hovered around $6–8 billion per year from 2012–2016. In 2017, Hurricanes Harvey, Irma, and Maria all impacted the market. This spurred yet another increase in issuance, now to the $10 billion per year mark. At year end 2023, Swiss Re Capital Markets estimates the market size is $43.1 billion with a record $15.4 billion issued in 2023 alone.

The cat bond market has withstood a multitude of catastrophes, both natural and manmade. These include September 11 attacks, Hurricane Katrina, the 2008 financial crisis, 2011 Tōhoku earthquake and tsunami, Hurricanes Harvey, Irma, and Maria, the COVID-19 pandemic, Hurricane Ida, and Hurricane Ian. Following each of these events, the market has increased the volume of primary issuance. Moreover, it is estimated that the market suffers from a historical loss rate between 2.69% and 3.00%. This loss rate is generally quite close to the estimated loss rate given by the catastrophe models broadly used in the market (2.00–3.00%).

== Investors ==
Investors choose to invest in catastrophe bonds because their return is largely uncorrelated with the return on other investments in fixed income or in equities, so cat bonds help investors achieve diversification. Investors also buy these securities because they generally pay higher interest rates (in terms of spreads over funding rates) than comparably rated corporate instruments, as long as they are not triggered.

Key categories of investors who participate in this market include hedge funds, ILS-dedicated funds, and asset managers. Life insurers, reinsurers, banks, pension funds, and other investors have also participated in offerings.

A number of specialized fund managers play a significant role in the sector, including Euler ILS Partners Ltd, Fermat Capital Management, K2 Advisors, Leadenhall Capital Partners, Nephila Capital, Aeolus Capital Management, Elementum Advisors, Schroder Investment Management, Neuberger Berman ILS, Twelve Capital, AXA Investment Managers, Plenum Investments, and Tangency Capital. Several mutual fund and hedge fund managers also invest in catastrophe bonds, among them Stone Ridge Asset Management, Amundi US, and PIMCO.

== Ratings ==
Cat bonds are sometimes rated by an agency such as Standard & Poor's, Moody's, or Fitch Ratings. A typical corporate bond is rated based on its probability of default due to the issuer going into bankruptcy. A catastrophe bond is rated based on its probability of default due to a qualifying catastrophe triggering loss of principal (attachment probability). This probability is determined with the use of catastrophe models. Most catastrophe bonds are rated below investment grade (B and BB category ratings), and the various rating agencies have adopted the view that securities generally must require multiple events before an occurrence of a loss in order to be rated investment grade.

For all cat bonds regardless of rating, a third-party modeling agent is hired as part of the transaction. This agent will generate a risk analysis of the bond taking into account the underlying structure of the notes using a catastrophe model. This risk analysis will generate an attachment probability (probability of first-dollar loss to the notes), an expected loss probability, and an exhaustion probability (probability of complete loss of principal). The two most commonly utilized modeling firms are Verisk AIR, and Moody's RMS.

== Structure ==
Most catastrophe bonds are issued by special purpose reinsurance companies domiciled in the Cayman Islands, Bermuda, or Ireland. These companies typically participate in one or more reinsurance treaties to protect buyers, most commonly insurers (called "cedants") or reinsurers (called "retrocedents"). This contract may be structured as a derivative in cases in which it is "triggered" by one or more indices or event parameters (see below), rather than losses of the cedant or retrocedent. Cat bonds are generally issued under rule 144A and are commonly listed on the Bermuda Stock Exchange (though they trade OTC).

=== Cover types ===
The sponsor and investment bank that structures the cat bond must choose how the principal impairment is triggered. Cat bonds can be categorized into four basic cover types. The cover types listed first are more correlated to the actual losses of the insurer sponsoring the cat bond. The cover types listed farther down the list are not as highly correlated to the insurer's actual losses, so the cat bond has to be structured carefully and properly calibrated, but investors would not have to worry about the insurer's claims adjustment practices.

Indemnity: triggered by the issuer's actual losses, so the sponsor is indemnified, as if they had purchased traditional catastrophe reinsurance.

Modeled loss: instead of dealing with the company's actual claims, an exposure portfolio is constructed for use with catastrophe modeling software, and then when there is a large event, the event parameters are run against the exposure database in the cat model.

Industry toss: instead of adding up the insurer's claims, the cat bond is triggered when the insurance industry loss from a certain peril reaches a specified threshold, say $30 billion. The cat bond will specify who determines the industry loss; typically it is a recognized agency like PCS or PERILS. "Modified index" linked securities customize the index to a company's own book of business by weighting the index results for various territories and lines of business. Common "modified index" structures are the state-weighted industry loss (SWIL—pronounced swill) and the county-weighted industry loss (CWIL—pronounced quill).

Parametric: instead of being based on any claims (the insurer's actual claims, the modeled claims, or the industry's claims), the trigger is indexed to the natural hazard caused by nature. So the parameter would be the windspeed (for a hurricane bond), the ground acceleration (for an earthquake bond), or whatever is appropriate for the peril. Data for this parameter is collected at multiple reporting stations and then entered into specified formulae. For example, if a typhoon generates windspeeds greater than X meters per second at 50 of the 150 weather observation stations of the Japanese Meteorological Agency, the cat bond is triggered.

Parametric index: Many firms are uncomfortable with pure parametric bonds due to the lack of correlation with actual loss. For instance, a bond may pay out based on the wind speed at 50 of the 150 stations mentioned above, but the insurer loses very little money because a majority of their exposure is concentrated in other locations. Models can give an approximation of loss as a function of the speed at differing locations, which are then used to give a payout function for the bond. These function as hybrid Parametric / Modeled loss bonds, and have lowered basis risk as well as more transparency.

=== Trigger types ===
Once a cover type has been chosen by the sponsor and investment bank, a trigger type must be selected. These can broadly be broken down into two categories.

Aggregate: the sum of losses over a time period (commonly one year, a so-called Annual Aggregate) breach a threshold (the attachment level) to trigger the bond payout.

Per occurrence: the loss from a single event must breach a threshold (the attachment level) to trigger the bond payout.

=== Common examples ===
While it is possible to structure a cat bond in a multitude of ways, below are three of the most commonly found structures in the cat bond market.

Industry loss aggregate: the sum of losses to the insurance industry (as reported by PCS or PERILS) over a given time frame must breach the attachment level. Say for example, 3 hurricanes and 1 earthquake all affect the covered area for a catastrophe bond. Each hurricane does $20 billion in damage and the earthquake does $40 billion. In this case, if the attachment of the note was set to $90 billion, the bond would pay out as the sum of the insured losses are $100 billion = $20 billion + $20 billion + $20 billion + $40 billion.

Indemnity per occurrence: the loss from a single event to a specific insurer must breach the attachment level. For example, an insurance company suffers a $500 million loss from an earthquake and a $400 million loss from a hurricane. If the attachment level was set to $550 million, then the bond would not pay out as neither the earthquake or hurricane caused enough damage to the insurer for the attachment level to be exceeded.

Parametric per occurrence: the parameter for a single event exceeds the preset threshold. For example, the wind speed in a certain location exceeded a specified velocity.

== Notable securitizations ==
Second and subsequent events: Some bonds cover the risk that multiple losses will occur (i.e. 2 or more qualifying events must occur before the cat bond suffers a loss). The first-second event bond (Atlas Re) was issued in March of 2000. This note covered European Windstorm and California or Japanese Earthquake. This was an indemnity cover for SCOR. Following this issuance, the first third event bond (Atlas II) was issued in December of 2001. Since the early 2000's many different second and subsequent event notes have been issued with a variety of coverages for a multitude of sponsors.

Life and health risk: Issued in April of 1998, the L1 Securitization for Hannover Re covered life reinsurance risk. This was a pseudo-quota share coverage. More comparable to the cat bonds of today, the Vita Re transaction of 2003 on behalf of Swiss Re is claimed to be the "pioneer of life ILS globally".

The International Bank for Reconstruction and Development (IBRD or World Bank) has sponsored a cat bond issuance to provide funding for the Pandemic Emergency Financing Facility (PEF). The IBRD CAR 111 and IBRD CAR 112 transaction raised $320 million of subscription in July of 2017. These notes did end up suffering a loss due to COVID-19.

Lottery winnings: In September of 2011, the Hoplon Re transaction provided $101 million of coverage to the MyLotto24 lottery. The covered risk was "the risk of exceptional jackpot wins" which could potentially cause the lottery to fail.

Stock market crashes and hedge fund collapses: Citigroup developed the Stability Note in 2003, which protects the issuer against catastrophic stock market crashes; it was later adapted to protect against hedge fund collapses. Professor Lawrence A. Cunningham of George Washington University suggests adapting cat bonds to the risks that large auditing firms face in cases asserting massive securities law damages.

Cyberattack: Beazley successfully sponsored the first cat bond contingent on cyberattack in January 2023, dubbed "Cairney". This was a $45 million Section 4(2) private cat bond that triggers on an indemnity per occurrence basis. The first public rule 144A cat bond was the Long Walk Re transaction in November of 2023, providing AXIS Capital with $75 million of indemnity per occurrence coverage. These notes cover so-called "systemic cyber events".

Terrorism: Pool Reinsurance Company (Pool Re), the UK government-backed mutual terrorism reinsurance facility, sponsored the issuance of Baltic PCC Limited (Series 2019) notes. This was an Indemnity Annual Aggregate transaction issued in February of 2019. It raised $97 million of support.

Event cancellation: Ahead of the 2006 FIFA World Cup, FIFA sponsored the Golden Goal Re transaction. The transaction was issued in September of 2003 and raised $262 million. If the 2006 FIFA tournament was canceled because of terrorism risk, the bond would pay out, resulting in a loss of 75% of the money invested in the bonds. As a result of the attacks in the USA on 11 September 2001 and the subsequent withdrawal by insurers from the 2002 FIFA World Cup cancellation insurance policy, FIFA requires any future protection to be immune from such risk, thus resulting in the issuance of Golden Goal Re.

Other: The first actively managed pool of bonds and other contracts ("Catastrophe CDO") called Gamut was issued in 2007, with Nephila as the asset manager.

== Market participants ==
Examples of cat bond sponsors include insurers, reinsurers, corporations, and government agencies. Over time, frequent issuers have included USAA, Scor SE, Swiss Re, Munich Re, Liberty Mutual, Hannover Re, Allianz, Tokio Marine Nichido, and SageSure. Mexico is the only national sovereign to have issued cat bonds (in 2006, for hedging earthquake risk and in 2009 and 2012, a multi structure instrument that covered earthquake and hurricane risk). In June 2014, the World Bank issued its first catastrophe bond linked to natural hazard (tropical cyclone and earthquake) risks in sixteen Caribbean countries, and in 2017 it launched the Pandemic Emergency Financing Facility to provide funding in case of pandemic disease.

To date, all direct catastrophe bond investors have been institutional investors, since all broadly distributed transactions have been distributed in that form. These have included specialized catastrophe bond funds, hedge funds, investment advisors (money managers), life insurers, reinsurers, pension funds, and others. Individual investors have generally purchased such securities through specialized funds.

There are 5 main investment banks that are active in the issuance of cat bonds. These include Aon Securities Inc., Swiss Re Capital Markets, GC Securities (a division of MMC Securities Corp. and an affiliate of Guy Carpenter), Howden Capital Markets and Advisory, and Gallagher Securities. There are also 5 main secondary market makers in the space. These are RBC, Beech Hill Securities, Gallagher Securities, Swiss Re Capital Markets, and Tullet Prebon.

== Patents ==
There are a number of issued US patents and pending US patent applications related to catastrophe bonds.

== See also ==
- Insurance-linked security
- Catastrophe modeling
- Fixed income
- Reinsurance
- Risk management
- Reinsurance sidecar
- Alternative risk transfer
- Year loss table
