= Insurance-linked security =

Type of financial asset

An insurance-linked security (ILS) is a type of financial asset whose value is driven by insurance loss events. Those such instruments that are linked to property losses due to natural catastrophes represent a unique asset class, the return from which is uncorrelated with that of other marketable asset classes.

== Overview ==
Insurance companies are in the business of assuming risk for individuals and institutions. They manage those risks by diversifying over a large number of policies, perils and geographic regions. There are two important ways insurers profit in this business.

One is by selling portfolios of insurance policies grouped into packages, to interested investors. The risk from low severity, high probability events can be diversified by writing a large number of similar policies. This reduces an insurer's risk because should a policy default, then the loss is shared between a large number of investors.

The second way insurers profit on policies is by re-insuring them through other insurers. A reinsurance policy would allow a second insurer to share in the gain and potential loss of the policy, much like an investor. The secondary insurer would share invested interest and risk. The reinsurance of policies offers additional risk capital and high returns for the policy originator, and minimizes their liability, while also providing high returns for any secondary insurer.

== History ==
Since 2001, the market for insurance-linked securities has increased substantially, creating an industry with over $103 billion trading between capital market investors. The union of insurance risks with the capital market created a new method for insurers to spread their risk and raise capital. Insurance-linked securities provide life insurance companies with the ability to transfer or spread their risk while releasing its value to the open market through asset-backed notes.

This emerging market showed much potential and growth until the collapse of the CDO market, with the effect of disrupting the ILS market.

The collapse of sub-prime collateralized debt obligations, or CDOs, had a disastrous effect on all structured financial markets, including life insurance risk. The high complexity of life insurance securitization is one of the reasons for the collapse of the insurance-linked securities market.

== Purpose ==
The market for insurance-linked securities has been very attractive for investors and insurers. One portion of insurance-linked securities is the reinsurance of high severity, low probability events known as CAT bonds, or catastrophe bonds. These include cover for natural disasters and other uncontrollable events. These policies are grouped by their assessed risk, and then re-insured by other insurers.

CAT bonds are very risky in general. Therefore, an insurer will try to minimize risk by writing many such policies. If an insurer charges a premium equal to the expected annual loss, it can stand to profit by those premiums by the law of large numbers.

Another way insurance companies can spread their risk from CAT bonds is to transfer risk to another insurer, thereby re-insuring the original insurer's portfolio and minimizing liability. A re-insurance policy could assume a loss of “$10 million above $50 million with 5% participation.” In this scenario, the secondary insurer pledges to pay the policy originator up to 95% of $10 million for any loss above $50 million.

Investors are attracted to these contracts because they are unrelated to financial markets. That is where the capital markets and insurance-linked securities meet, through derivative or securities markets. CAT bonds are grouped by their level of risk and sold in portfolios in security markets. This makes re-insuring these contracts more attractive because it opens a whole market for them to be sold and for risk to be spread among many investors. It is more attractive to write expensive, risky policies and share the risk with thousands of others than it is for one firm to assume total liability.

== Types ==
The most prevalent securitized insurance contracts exchanged in capital markets include:

- Catastrophe bonds
- Embedded Value Securitization
- Extreme Mortality Securitization
- Life Settlements Securitization
- Longevity Swaps
- Reserve Funding Securitization
- Fully Collateralized Reinsurance

== Issuance ==
To issue an ILS in the security or derivative market, an insurer would first issue an SPV, or Special purpose vehicle. An SPV has two functions; it provides re-insurance for insurance companies and issues securities to investors. At first, an SPV deposits funds collected by investors into a trust. Any interested parties will pay a premium to the SPV. The money from the premium and investment income will provide the interest payments owed to investors.

If there is no catastrophic event, or trigger event, before the maturity date of the contract, investors will receive back their principal investment at maturity on top of the interest payments they have received.
