= Hannover Re =

Reinsurance company based in Hannover, Germany

Hannover Rück SE

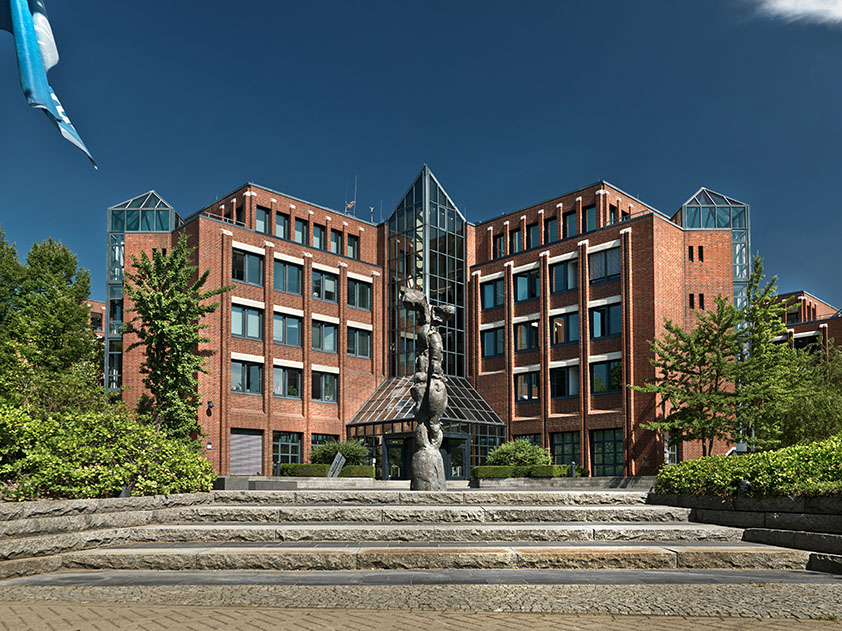
- Company headquarters in Hannover
- Company type: Public (Societas Europaea)
- Traded as: FWB: HNR1; FWB: HNRB (ADR); OTC Pink Current: HVRRF; OTC Pink Current: HVRRY (ADR); DAX component (HNR1)
- ISIN: DE0008402215; US4106931052
- Industry: Insurance services
- Founded: 1966; 60 years ago
- Headquarters: Hannover, Germany
- Key people: Clemens Jungsthöfel (CEO); Sven Althoff; Claude Chèvre; Christian Hermelingmeier; Brona Magee; Sharon Ooi; Silke Sehm; Thorsten Steinmann; Torsten Leue (Chairman of the supervisory board)
- Products: Reinsurance
- Revenue: € 24.5 billion (Reinsurance revenue, 2023)
- Owner: Talanx (50.2 %)
- Number of employees: 3,756
- Website: www.hannover-re.com

Hannover Re (in German Hannover Rück) is a reinsurance company based in Hannover, Germany. It is the third-largest reinsurance group in the world, with a gross premium of around €33 billion. Founded in 1966, Hannover Re transacts all lines of property & casualty and life & health reinsurance and has a network of over 170 subsidiaries, branches and representative offices on all five continents with a total staff of more than 3,000. The Group's German property and casualty business is written by the subsidiary E+S Rück.

== History ==
Hannover Re was founded on 6 June 1966.

In the 1970s, the company entered the US and Japanese markets. In 1981, the company made its first acquisition of a foreign insurance group – the Hollandia Group (now Hannover Re Group Africa). In 1990, the acquisition of Hamburger Internationale Rückversicherungs-AG followed.

In 1994, Hannover Re went public. In the same year, the company was the first reinsurer ever to securitise natural catastrophe risks for the capital market.

In 1996, Eisen und Stahl Rück was integrated into the Hannover Re Group. From then on, Hannover Re serves foreign insurance markets, while Eisen und Stahl Rück – now E+S Rück – takes responsibility for handling the German property and casualty market.

As part of its increasingly international orientation, the legal form of the company was conversed to a Societas Europaea (European Company) in 2013. Hannover Re has since traded as Hannover Rück SE.

In 2025, Clemens Jungsthöfel succeeded Jean-Jacques Henchoz as Chief Executive Officer of Hannover Re.

== Structure ==
Hannover Re transacts reinsurance in the business groups Property & Casualty and Life & Health.

Property & Casualty: Hannover Re offers a comprehensive range of products in treaty and facultative reinsurance as well as in the area of structured reinsurance solutions.

Life & Health: Hannover Re offers its customers worldwide reinsurance protection in all lines of life and health insurance. It supports clients with the financing of new business and financial optimisation and offers product partnerships for strategic market positioning.

== Share and shareholder ==
The majority shareholder of Hannover Re is Talanx AG with 50.2% of the voting rights. The remaining shares are held by institutional or private investors.

== Leadership ==
Members of the Executive Board: Clemens Jungsthöfel (CEO), Christian Hermelingmeier (CFO), Sven Althoff (Property & Casualty reinsurance), Sharon Ooi (Property & Casualty reinsurance), Silke Sehm (Property & Casualty reinsurance), Thorsten Steinmann (Property & Casualty reinsurance), Claude Chèvre (Life & Health reinsurance), Brona Magee (Life & Health reinsurance).

Members of the Supervisory Board: Torsten Leue (Chairman), Herbert K. Haas, Ilka Hundeshagen, Timo Kaufmann, Harald Kayser, Sibylle Kempff, Alena Kouba, Dr. Ursula Lipowsky, Dr. Michael Ollmann.

== Locations ==
Africa: Abidjan, Johannesburg The Americas: Bogotá, Denver, Hamilton, Itasca, Mexico City, Orlando, Rio de Janeiro, Toronto Asia: Hong Kong, Kuala Lumpur, Manama, Mumbai, Seoul, Shanghai, Taipei, Tokyo Australia: Sydney Europe: Dublin, Hannover, London, Madrid, Milan, Paris, Stockholm

== Hannover Re Foundation ==
The Hannover Re Foundation was created in 1991 to mark the company's 25th anniversary. Its focus was initially – and remains to this day – on supporting contemporary art and culture in the region, especially through the acquisition of artworks which are made available to the Sprengel Museum in Hannover on permanent loan. It also lends its support to other cultural institutions based in the region, such as the Kunstverein Hannover, the Kestnergesellschaft, the Wilhelm Busch Museum and the Art Museum of Celle. In 2022 the Foundation substantially expanded its self-defined mandate and amended its statutes. Since taking this step, it has extended its support for art and culture to also include projects relating to sustainability. The emphasis is on projects that – in the global context – promote environmental and climate protection, training and education, science and research as well as preventive protection against natural disasters. This also includes the goal of contributing to the creation of intragenerational justice and leaving behind a liveable world for future generations. Since 2023 the Hannover Re Foundation has additionally assumed responsibility for the "Masterclass Students" exhibition series, which was launched back in 2014 in cooperation with Braunschweig University of Art.

Hannover Rück SE additionally has its own corporate art collection.
