= Design For All (product line) =

Range of designer products

Design For All is a range of designer products made available at discount retailers by the Target Corporation.

In the late 1990s, the Target Corporation began designer partnerships to bring products created by well-known designers in different disciplines to their retail stores. This notion of designers creating products that could be made available at discount retailers would be later labeled as 'Design For All' by the Target Corporation.

Target first partnered with architect and designer Michael Graves. In 1999, the company commissioned 200 products from Graves for its stores. The products designed by Graves were household items, the first and most notable of which was a tea kettle that bore a close resemblance to a well-known kettle Graves designed for Alessi in 1985. The Target version of the tea kettle offered a similar design at a more affordable price.

At the same time the Michael Graves products were released, Target also introduced a new line of clothing by Mossimo, as well as a line of cosmetics by Sonia Kashuk, expanding their designer partnerships throughout the departments within their discount stores.

Although other discount retailers like K-Mart had collaborated with celebrities in the past, the Target Corporation was the first whose collaboration focused on the design of the product as opposed to the name behind it. The success of the initial designer partnerships opened the door for future collaborations with a varied array of designers from around the globe. The focus on product design, and not name recognition, made it possible to collaborate with both well-known and obscure designers.

While a design-centric focus and creative marketing campaign have helped make the 'Design For All' campaign a success for the Target Corporation, the retailer's work with a New York City design firm named Culture & Commerce is an important factor in that success. Target works with Culture & Commerce to find designers that they will partner with for new product designs.
