= Reinsurance =

Insurance purchased by an insurance company

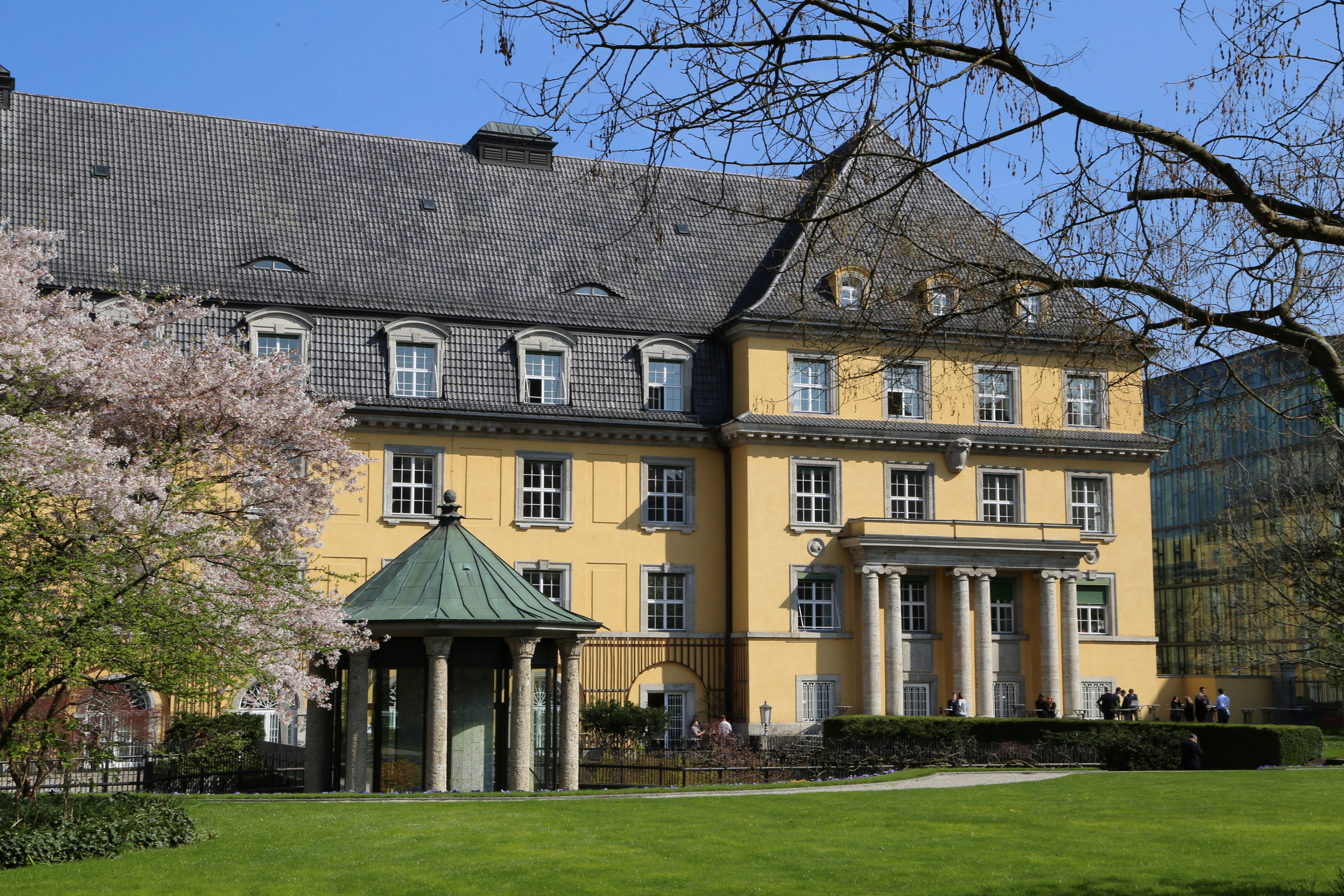
Headquarters of the Munich Reinsurance Company

Reinsurance is a form of insurance contract which protects insurance firms from risks relating to the policies they underwrite. Reinsurance firms contract with insurers to undertake to cover all or part of the cost of certain policies, in exchange for a cash payment (as with regular insurance) or a percentage of the premiums of the policies reinsured. In addition to protecting against risk, liabilities assumed by the reinsurer no longer count against the primary insurer’s underwriting capacity, enabling the company to underwrite more policies.

== Functions ==
Insurers commonly use reinsurance as part of their risk and capital management, transferring a portion of their underwriting risk to reinsurers in exchange for a premium. The structure and extent of a reinsurance programme can vary with an insurer's business strategy, risk appetite and cost of capital, and some insurers may choose to retain all risk.

=== Risk transfer ===
With reinsurance, the insurer can issue policies with higher limits than would otherwise be allowed, thus being able to take on more risk because some of that risk is now transferred to the re-insurer. See Financial risk management § Insurance.

=== Income smoothing ===
Reinsurance can make an insurance company's results more predictable by absorbing large losses. This is likely to reduce the amount of capital needed to provide coverage. The risks are spread, with the reinsurer or reinsurers bearing some of the loss incurred by the insurance company. The income smoothing arises because the losses of the cedent are limited. This fosters stability in claim payouts and caps indemnification costs.

=== Surplus relief ===
Proportional Treaties (or "pro-rata" treaties) provide the cedent with "surplus relief"; surplus relief being the capacity to write more business and/or at larger limits.

=== Arbitrage ===
The insurance company may be motivated by arbitrage in purchasing reinsurance coverage at a lower rate than they charge the insured for the underlying risk, whatever the class of insurance.

In general, the reinsurer may be able to cover the risk at a lower premium than the insurer because:

- The reinsurer may have some intrinsic cost advantage due to economies of scale or some other efficiency.
- Reinsurers may operate under weaker regulation than their clients. This enables them to use less capital to cover any risk, and to make less conservative assumptions when valuing the risk.
- Reinsurers may operate under a more favourable tax regime than their clients.
- Reinsurers will often have better access to underwriting expertise and to claims experience data, enabling them to assess the risk more accurately and reduce the need for contingency margins in pricing the risk.
- Even if the regulatory standards are the same, the reinsurer may be able to hold smaller actuarial reserves than the cedent if it thinks the premiums charged by the cedent are excessively conservative.
- The reinsurer may have a more diverse portfolio of assets and especially liabilities than the cedent. This may create opportunities for hedging that the cedent could not exploit alone. Depending on the regulations imposed on the reinsurer, this may mean they can hold fewer assets to cover the risk.
- The reinsurer may have a greater risk appetite than the insurer.

=== Reinsurer's expertise ===
The insurance company may want to avail itself of the expertise of a reinsurer, or the reinsurer's ability to set an appropriate premium, in regard to a specific (specialised) risk. The reinsurer will also wish to apply this expertise to the underwriting in order to protect their own interests. This is especially the case in Facultative Reinsurance.

=== Creating a manageable and profitable portfolio of insured risks ===
By choosing a particular type of reinsurance method, the insurance company may be able to create a more balanced and homogeneous portfolio of insured risks. This would make its results more predictable on a net basis (i.e. allowing for the reinsurance). This is usually one of the objectives of reinsurance arrangements for the insurance companies.

== Types of reinsurance ==
=== Proportional ===
Under proportional reinsurance, one or more reinsurers take a stated percentage share of each policy that an insurer issues ("writes"). The reinsurer will then receive that stated percentage of the premiums and will pay the stated percentage of claims. In addition, the reinsurer will allow a "ceding commission" to the insurer to cover the costs incurred by the ceding insurer (mainly acquisition and administration, as well as the expected profit that the cedent is giving up).

The arrangement may be "quota share" or "surplus reinsurance" (also known as surplus of line or variable quota share treaty) or a combination of the two. Under a quota share arrangement, a fixed percentage (say 75%) of each insurance policy is reinsured. Under a surplus share arrangement, the ceding company decides on a "retention limit": say $100,000. The ceding company retains the full amount of each risk, up to a maximum of $100,000 per policy or per risk, and the excess over this retention limit is reinsured.

The ceding company may seek a quota share arrangement for several reasons. First, it may not have sufficient capital to prudently retain all of the business that it can sell. For example, it may only be able to offer a total of $100 million in coverage, but by reinsuring 75% of it, it can sell four times as much, and retain some of the profits on the additional business via the ceding commission.

The ceding company may seek surplus reinsurance to limit the losses it might incur from a small number of large claims as a result of random fluctuations in experience. In a 9 line surplus treaty the reinsurer would then accept up to $900,000 (9 lines). So if the insurance company issues a policy for $100,000, they would keep all of the premiums and losses from that policy. If they issue a $200,000 policy, they would give (cede) half of the premiums and losses to the reinsurer (1 line each). The maximum automatic underwriting capacity of the cedent would be $1,000,000 in this example. Any policy larger than this would require facultative reinsurance.

=== Non-proportional ===
Under non-proportional reinsurance the reinsurer only pays out if the total claim(s) suffered by the insurer exceed a stated amount, which is called the "retention" or "priority". For instance the insurer may be prepared to accept a total loss up to $1 million, and purchases a layer of reinsurance of $4 million in excess of this $1 million. If a loss of $3 million were then to occur, the insurer would bear $1 million of the loss and would recover $2 million from its reinsurer. In this example, the insurer also retains any loss over $5 million unless it has purchased a further excess layer of reinsurance.

The main forms of non-proportional reinsurance are excess of loss and stop loss.

Excess of loss reinsurance can have three forms - "Per Risk XL" (Working XL), "Per Occurrence or Per Event XL" (Catastrophe or Cat XL), and "Aggregate XL".

In per risk, the cedent's insurance policy limits are greater than the reinsurance retention. For example, an insurance company might insure commercial property risks with policy limits up to $10 million, and then buy per risk reinsurance of $5 million in excess of $5 million. In this case a loss of $6 million on that policy will result in the recovery of $1 million from the reinsurer. These contracts usually contain event limits to prevent their misuse as a substitute for Catastrophe XLs.

In catastrophe excess of loss, the cedent's retention is usually a multiple of the underlying policy limits, and the reinsurance contract usually contains a two risk warranty (i.e. they are designed to protect the cedent against catastrophic events that involve more than one policy, usually very many policies). For example, an insurance company issues homeowners' policies with limits of up to $500,000 and then buys catastrophe reinsurance of $22,000,000 in excess of $3,000,000. In that case, the insurance company would only recover from reinsurers in the event of multiple policy losses in one event (e.g., hurricane, earthquake, flood).

Aggregate XL affords a frequency protection to the reinsured. For instance if the company retains $1 million net any one vessel, $5 million annual aggregate limit in excess of $5m annual aggregate deductible, the cover would equate to 5 total losses (or more partial losses) in excess of 5 total losses (or more partial losses). Aggregate covers can also be linked to the cedent's gross premium income during a 12-month period, with limit and deductible expressed as percentages and amounts. Such covers are then known as "stop loss" contracts.

=== Risks attaching basis ===
A basis under which reinsurance is provided for claims arising from policies commencing during the period to which the reinsurance relates. The insurer knows there is coverage during the whole policy period even if claims are only discovered or made later on.

All claims from cedent underlying policies incepting during the period of the reinsurance contract are covered even if they occur after the expiration date of the reinsurance contract. Any claims from cedent underlying policies incepting outside the period of the reinsurance contract are not covered even if they occur during the period of the reinsurance contract.

=== Losses occurring basis ===
A Reinsurance treaty under which all claims occurring during the period of the contract, irrespective of when the underlying policies incepted, are covered. Any losses occurring after the contract expiration date are not covered.

As opposed to claims-made or risks attaching contracts. Insurance coverage is provided for losses occurring in the defined period. This is the usual basis of cover for short tail business.

=== Claims-made basis ===
A treaty written on a claims-made basis covers claims that occur and are made (reported) during the reinsurance contract term, for losses occurring on or after any retroactive date specified in the contract; claims reported after the term are not covered unless the reporting period is extended by agreement.

=== Assumption ===
Assumption reinsurance is a form of reinsurance whereby the reinsurer is substituted for the ceding insurer and becomes directly liable for policy claims. This ordinarily requires a notice and release from affected policyholders.

== Contracts ==
Most of the above examples concern reinsurance contracts (treaty contracts) that cover more than one policy. Reinsurance can also be purchased on a per policy basis, in which case it is known as facultative reinsurance. Facultative reinsurance can be written on either a proportional or excess of loss basis. Facultative reinsurance contracts are commonly memorialized in relatively brief contracts known as facultative certificates and often are used for large or unusual risks that do not fit within standard reinsurance treaties due to their exclusions. The term of a facultative agreement coincides with the term of the policy. Facultative reinsurance is usually purchased by the insurance underwriter who underwrote the original insurance policy, whereas treaty reinsurance is typically purchased by an outwards reinsurance manager, or other senior executive at the insurance company.

The reinsurer's liability will usually cover the whole lifetime of the original insurance, once it is written. However the question arises of when either party can choose to cease the reinsurance in respect of future new business. Reinsurance treaties can either be written on a "continuous" or "term" basis. A continuous contract has no predetermined end date, but generally either party can give 90 days notice to cancel or amend the treaty for new business. A term agreement has a built-in expiration date.

It is common for insurers and reinsurers to have long-term relationships that span many years. Reinsurance treaties are typically longer documents than facultative certificates, containing many of their own terms that are distinct from the terms of the direct insurance policies that they reinsure. However, even most reinsurance treaties are relatively short documents considering the number and variety of risks and lines of business that the treaties reinsure and the dollars involved in the transactions. They rely heavily on industry practice. There are not "standard" reinsurance contracts. However, many reinsurance contracts do include some commonly used provisions and provisions imbued with considerable industry common and practice.

== Fronting ==
=== Fronting arrangements ===
Sometimes insurance companies wish to offer insurance in jurisdictions where they are not licensed, or where it considers that local regulations are too onerous: for example, an insurer may wish to offer an insurance programme to a multinational company, to cover property and liability risks in many countries around the world. In such situations, the insurance company may find a local insurance company which is authorised in the relevant country, arrange for the local insurer to issue an insurance policy covering the risks in that country, and enter into a reinsurance contract with the local insurer to transfer the risks to itself.

In the event of a loss, the policyholder would claim against the local insurer under the local insurance policy, the local insurer would pay the claim and would claim reimbursement under the reinsurance contract. Such an arrangement is called "fronting". Fronting is also sometimes used where an insurance buyer requires its insurers to have a certain financial strength rating and the prospective insurer does not satisfy that requirement: the prospective insurer may be able to persuade another insurer, with the requisite credit rating, to provide the coverage to the insurance buyer, and to take out reinsurance in respect of the risk. An insurer which acts as a "fronting insurer" receives a fronting fee for this service to cover administration and the potential default of the reinsurer. The fronting insurer is taking a risk in such transactions, because it has an obligation to pay its insurance claims even if the reinsurer becomes insolvent and fails to reimburse the claims.

=== Subscription placements and retrocession ===
Many reinsurance placements are not placed with a single reinsurer but are shared between a number of reinsurers. For example, a $30,000,000 excess of $20,000,000 layer may be shared by 30 or more reinsurers. The reinsurer who sets the terms (premium and contract conditions) for the reinsurance contract is called the lead reinsurer; the other companies subscribing to the contract are called following reinsurers. Alternatively, one reinsurer can accept the whole of the reinsurance and then retrocede it (pass it on in a further reinsurance arrangement) to other companies.

=== Square-root rule ===
Using game-theoretic modeling, Professors Michael R. Powers (Temple University) and Martin Shubik (Yale University) have argued that the number of active reinsurers in a given national market should be approximately equal to the square-root of the number of primary insurers active in the same market. Econometric analysis has provided empirical support for the Powers-Shubik rule.

=== Security and governance considerations ===
Ceding companies often choose their reinsurers with great care as they are exchanging insurance risk for credit risk. Risk managers monitor reinsurers' financial ratings (S&P, A.M. Best, etc.) and aggregated exposures regularly.

Because of the governance effect insurance/cedent companies can have on society, reinsurers can indirectly have societal impact as well, due to reinsurer underwriting and claims philosophies imposed on those underlying carriers which affects how the cedents offer coverage in the market. However, reinsurer governance is voluntarily accepted by cedents via contract to allow cedents the opportunity to rent reinsurer capital to expand cedent market share or limit their risk.

== History and development ==
Reinsurance developed alongside marine insurance, where underwriters sought to share the risks of long-distance trips by transferring part of a contract to another underwriter. One early reinsurance contract on record dates to 1370 and involved the transfer of risk for part of a voyage from Genoa towards Bruges.

In the 19th century, the growth of property insurance and large urban fires increased demand for organised risk-sharing arrangements. One early specialist reinsurer was the Cologne Reinsurance Company, founded in 1846 in Germany, with operations beginning in the early 1850s. Later in the century, large professional reinsurers were founded in continental Europe, including the Swiss Re (1863) and the Munich Re (1880).

By the late 20th century and into the 21st century, reinsurance had developed into a global market supporting insurers' underwriting capacity and solvency planning, with particular importance for catastrophe exposures and other large loss scenarios.

== See also ==
- Increased limit factors
- Assumption reinsurance
- Catastrophe bond
- Catastrophe modeling
- Financial reinsurance
- Financial risk management § Insurance
- List of years in the environment
- Life insurance securitization
- Reinsurance sidecar
- Stop-loss insurance
- Year loss table
