= List of schools in Humboldt County, California =

List of public and private primary schools in Humboldt County, California.

== Private schools ==
- Saint Bernard's Catholic School (Preschool-12) (Eureka)
- Humboldt Bay Christian School (1–8) (Bayside, California|Bayside)
- Fortuna Junior Academy (K-8) (Fortuna)
- Redwood Christian School (K-8) (Eureka)
- Mistwood Educational Center (K-12) (Bayside)

== Charter schools ==
- Alder Grove Charter School - I.S. (K-12)
- American Indian Academy (McKinleyville)
- Beginnings (K-8) - I.S. (Briceland)
- Blue Heron Middle School (4–8) - I.S. (Arcata)
- Campus House - I.S. (Arcata)
- Cutten Resource Center (Eureka)
- Coastal Grove Charter School (K-8) (Arcata)
- Dunes of Discovery (K-8) - I.S. (Arcata)
- Freshwater Charter Middle School (7–8)
- Fuente Nueva (K-5)(Arcata)
- Jacoby Creek Charter School (K-8) (Bayside)
- Laurel Tree Learning Center (K-12) (Arcata)
- Mattole Valley Charter School (K-12) (Honeydew)
- Laurel Tree (K-12) - I.S. (Arcata)
- North Coast Learning (K-12) - I.S. (Eureka)
- North Coast High School - I.S. Eureka
- Northcoast Charter - Main Campus (K-8) (Arcata/Trinidad)
- Northcoast Preparatory and Performing Arts Academy (Arcata)
- Pacific View Charter School (3–12)
- Redway Site - I.S.
- River Valley School (K-8) - I.S. (Fortuna)
- Six Rivers Charter High School (9–12) (Arcata)
- South Bay Charter (7–8) (Eureka)
- South Bay Charter Independent Studies (Tk-8) Eureka
- Trillium Charter School (K-5) (Arcata)

== Humboldt County Public School Districts and Schools ==
=== Arcata School District ===
- Arcata Elementary Preschool ages 2–5
- Arcata Elementary School K-5
- SunnyBrae Middle School 6–8
- Arcata High School 9–12
- Pacific Union Elementary School K-8

=== Big Lagoon Union Elementary School District ===
- Big Lagoon School K-8

=== Blue Lake Union Elementary School District ===
- Blue Lake School K-8
- Green Point School K-7

=== Bridgeville Elementary School District ===
- Bridgeville School K-8

=== Cuddeback Union School District ===
- Cuddeback School K-8

=== Cutten Elementary School District ===
- Ridgewood School K-2
- Cutten School 3–6

=== Eureka City Schools District ===
- Alice Birney School K-5
- Eureka Adult School
- Eureka High School 9-12
- Grant School K-5
- Humboldt Bay High School
- Lafayette School K-5
- Lincoln School K-5
- Washington School K-5
- Winship Middle School 6-8
- Winzler Children's Center
- Zane Middle School 7-8
- Zoe Barnum High School

=== Ferndale Unified School District ===
- Ferndale Elementary School K-8
- Ferndale High School

=== Fieldbrook Elementary School District ===
- Fieldbrook School K-8

=== Fortuna Union School District ===
==== Fortuna Elementary School District ====
- Fortuna Middle School 5-8
- South Fortuna Elementary School K-4

==== Fortuna Union High School District ====
- Academy of the Redwoods
- East High Fortuna
- Fortuna Union High School 9–12

==== Rohnerville Elementary School District ====
- Ambrosini School K-4
- Toddy Thomas School 5–8

=== Freshwater Elementary School District ===
- Freshwater School K-6
- Freshwater Charter Middle School 7,8

=== Garfield Elementary School District ===
- Garfield School K-6

=== Humboldt County Office of Education ===
- Glen Paul Center
- Pacific Coast High School
- Mattole Valley Charter School
- Terra Madre Alternative School
- Northcoast Preparatory Academy

=== Hydesville Elementary School District ===
- Hydesville School K-8
- Jacoby Creek Charter School District
- Jacoby Creek Charter School K-8

=== Klamath-Trinity Joint Unified School District ===
- Capt. John Continuation High School Alt.
- Hoopa Valley Elementary School K-8
- Hoopa Valley High School 9–12
- Jack Norton Elementary School K-8
- Orleans Elementary School K-8 (Trinity County)
- Trinity Valley Elementary School K-8
- Weitchpec Elementary School K-8

=== Kneeland Elementary School District ===
- Kneeland School K-8

=== Loleta Union School District ===
- Loleta Elementary School K-8

=== Maple Creek Elementary School District ===
- Maple Creek School K-8

=== Mattole Unified School District ===
- Honeydew Elementary School K-6
- Mattole Elementary School K-8
- Mattole Triple Junction High School 9–12

=== McKinleyville Union School District ===
- Dow's Prairie School K-5
- McKinleyville Middle 6–8
- Morris Elementary K-5
- McKinleyville High School 9–12

=== Northern Humboldt Union High School District ===
- Arcata High School 9–12
- McKinleyville High School 9–12
- Northern Humboldt Adult School Adult
- Pacific Coast High School Alt.
- Tsurai High School Alt.

=== Orick Elementary School District ===
- Orick School K-8

=== Pacific Union School District ===
- Pacific Union School K-8

=== Peninsula Union School District ===
- Peninsula School K-8

=== Rio Dell School District ===
- Monument Middle School 4–8
- Eagle Prairie Elementary School K-3

=== Scotia Union School District ===
- Scotia School K-8

=== South Bay Union School District ===
- Pine Hill School K-3
- South Bay School 4–6
- South Bay Middle School 7–8
- South Bay Independent Studies TK-8

=== Southern Humboldt Unified School District ===
- Agnes J. Johnson School (K-6) (also known as Weott Elementary)
- Casterlin Elementary School (K-8)
- Ettersburg School (K-3)
- Redway School (K-7)
- South Fork High School (Miranda, California) (8–12)
- Osprey Learning Center (6–12)
- Whitethorn School (K-5)

=== Trinidad School District ===
- Trinidad Elementary School (K-8)
