= Thomas and Dorothy Leavey Library =

Library at the University of Southern California

Leavey Library
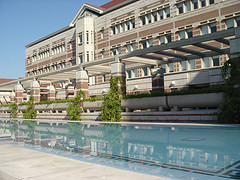
- Leavey Library
- 34.021775°N 118.282956°W
- Location: University Park, Los Angeles, United States
- Type: Academic library
- Scope: Undergraduate
- Established: 1994
- Branch of: University of Southern California Libraries

Access and use
- Circulation: 91,000

Other information
- Website: http://www.usc.edu/libraries/locations/leavey/

The Thomas and Dorothy Leavey Library is one of the two main undergraduate libraries at the University of Southern California, United States. It was named in memory of Thomas E. Leavey, the founder of Farmers Insurance Group.

== History ==
The library, completed in the mid-1990s, reflected a shift to designs closer to earlier Romanesque Revival architecture. It was named in honor of Thomas E. Leavey, the founder of Farmers Insurance Group, and his wife, Dorothy Leavey. The donation was made through their Thomas and Dorothy Leavey Foundation in 1994.
