= Dorothy Leavey =

American philanthropist

- Born: Dorothy E. Risley; 1897; Omaha, Nebraska
- Died: January 7, 1998 (aged 100–101); Beverly Hills, California
- Resting place: Holy Cross Cemetery
- Education: University of Montana
- Occupation: Philanthropist
- Spouse: Thomas E. Leavey (m. 1930; died 1980)
- Children: Dorothy Therese Leavey; Kathleen McCarthy Kostlan

Dorothy E. Risley Leavey (1897 – January 7, 1998) was an American philanthropist from Beverly Hills, California.

== Early life ==
Dorothy E. Risley was born in 1897 in Omaha, Nebraska. She grew up in Cleveland, Chicago and Butte, Montana. She was educated at the Convent of the Sacred Heart in Lake Forest, Illinois. Risley then attended the University of Montana. She briefly worked as a legal secretary.

== Philanthropy ==
Shortly after getting married in 1930, she volunteered for the Assistance League, the Ladies of Charity, the Salesian Boys Camp in Oceanside and the Social Service Auxiliary. She also established the Teresita Pines Camp for Girls.

In 1952, she co-founded the Thomas and Dorothy Leavey Foundation with her husband. In 1994, they made two major donations for the establishment of the Thomas and Dorothy Leavey Library on the campus of the University of Southern California and the Dorothy E. Leavey Family Resource Center at the Assistance League in Hollywood. She later donated to Mothers Against Drunk Driving (MADD), a non-profit organization founded by Candy Lightner.

A devout Roman Catholic, she became a Dame of the Order of St. Gregory and a Dame of Magistral Grace of the Sovereign Military Order of Malta. Moreover, she received four honorary degrees—from the University of Southern California, Santa Clara University, Georgetown University and Loyola Marymount University.

== Personal life ==
In 1930, she married Thomas E. Leavey, co-founder of Farmers Insurance Group. They resided in Beverly Hills, California. They had two children: Kathleen and Dorothy Therese. Their daughter Dorothy Therese was killed in a car accident in 1979. A year later, in 1980, she became a widow when her husband died. Their daughter, Kathleen McCarthy Kostlan, became a philanthropist.

== Death ==
She died on January 7, 1998, at the age of 101 in Beverly Hills, California. Her funeral took place at St. Paul the Apostle Church in Westwood. She was buried at the Holy Cross Cemetery in Culver City.
