= Leavey Center =

Building in California, United States

- Leavey Activities Center, Toso Pavilion
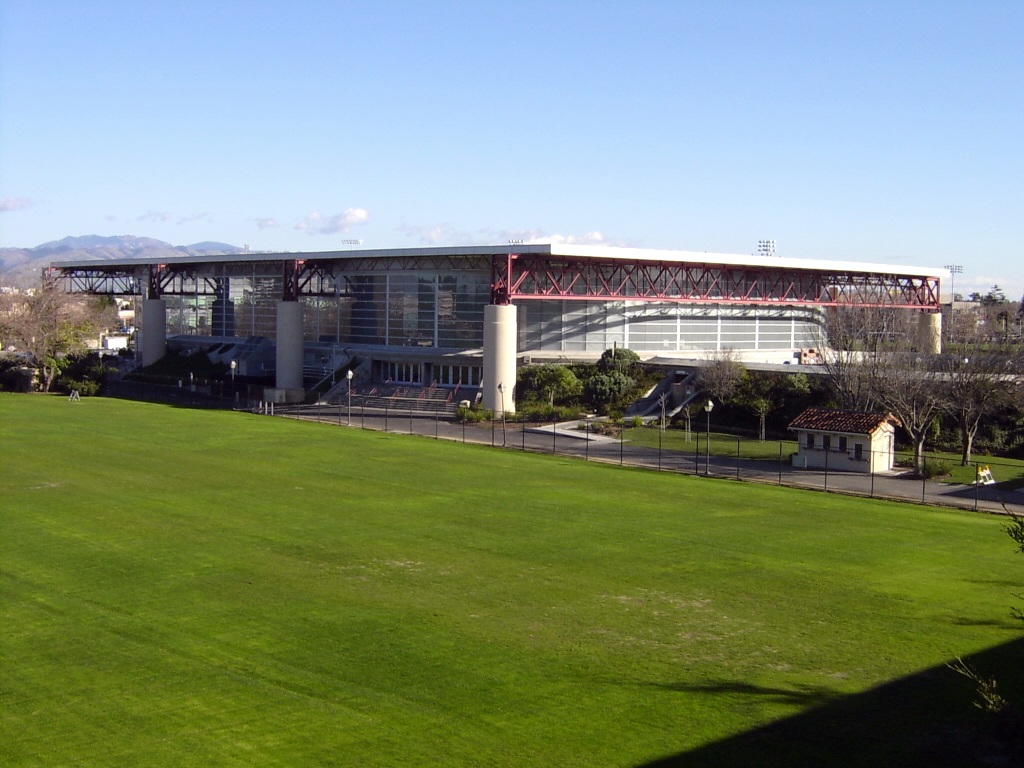
- Interactive map of Leavey Center
- Former names: Harold J. Toso Pavilion (1975-2000)
- Location: 500 El Camino Real, Santa Clara, California 95053
- Coordinates: 37°20′56.80″N 121°56′7.09″W
- Owner: Santa Clara University
- Operator: Santa Clara University
- Capacity: 5,000 (1975); 4,500 (2001)
- Public transit: Santa Clara Station

Construction
- Groundbreaking: 1974
- Opened: 1975; December 13, 2000 after renovation
- Cost: $4.6 million 1975; $26 million 2000 (total after renovation)
- Architects: Albert A. Hoover and Associates

Tenant
- Santa Clara University Broncos (NCAA Division I West Coast Conference) (1975–present)

Leavey Center, also known as the Leavey Activities Center or occasionally by its old nickname the Toso Pavilion, is Santa Clara University's indoor basketball arena in Santa Clara, California. It is home to the Santa Clara Broncos basketball and volleyball teams. It has hosted the West Coast Conference men's basketball tournament ten times.

== Arena history ==
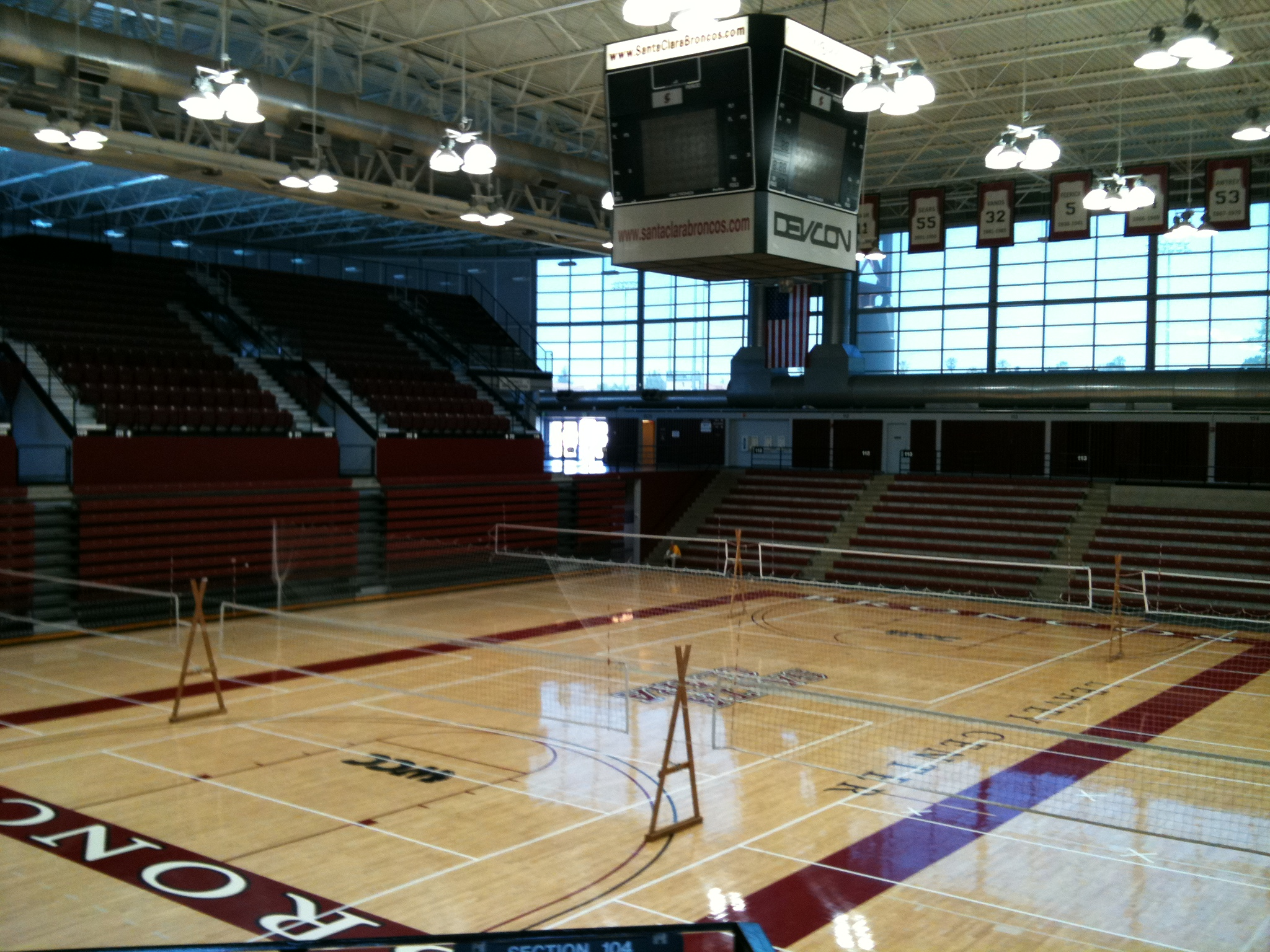
Inside Leavey Center

Leavey Center began life as the Harold J. Toso Pavilion, or Toso Pavilion constructed in 1975. The facility featured an air supported vinyl fabric roof supported by 11 large fans constantly producing a higher air pressure inside the dome than outside, similar to the Pontiac Silverdome or BC Place Stadium. The inside of the facility featured the main activity floor, two recreation areas, and team locker rooms. The roof developed several tears over the years and on April 4, 2000, the dome was deflated to make room for a more permanent roof structure to be built over the arena.

The newly rechristened Leavey Center was renovated and reopened on December 13, 2000, now sporting a much taller steel roof supported by eight large concrete caissons outside the arena. The interior was only partially constructed on opening day with most of the western half of the building still walled off with plywood. However, in late 2001 the construction was completed and the Leavey Center reopened featuring a new two level grandstand on the east side of the court in addition to the single level seating around the rest of the court. The indoor track had been removed and a second practice court was moved to behind the west bleachers. The athletic offices of the university were also moved into the new center behind the larger eastern grandstand. The renovation cost $14 million to complete.

The Leavey Center is named after the late founder of Farmers Insurance, Thomas E. Leavey, who graduated from Santa Clara in 1922. The renovations were funded by the Thomas and Dorothy Leavey Foundation.

Leavey Center also played host to the Stanford University basketball teams for a number of games while the Maples Pavilion underwent renovation.

== See also ==
- List of NCAA Division I basketball arenas
