= Ferndale Unified School District =

School district in California, United States

Address
- 1231 Main Street Ferndale, California, 95536; United States

District information
- Type: Public
- Grades: K–12
- Schools: 2
- NCES District ID: 0600037

Students and staff
- Students: 454
- Teachers: 30.32 (FTE)
- Staff: 31.77 (FTE)
- Student–teacher ratio: 14.97

Other information
- Website: www.ferndalek12.org

The Ferndale Unified School District, oversees public education through grade 12, in Ferndale, California, and the surrounding area, including the "Ferndale bottoms" and an area of the Wildcat Hills in Humboldt County, California.

The district operates two schools: the Ferndale Elementary School for kindergarten through eighth grade and Ferndale High School for grades 9 through 12. The school board has five members who meet monthly in the Ferndale High School library; agendas and board packets are available online.

== Ferndale Elementary School ==
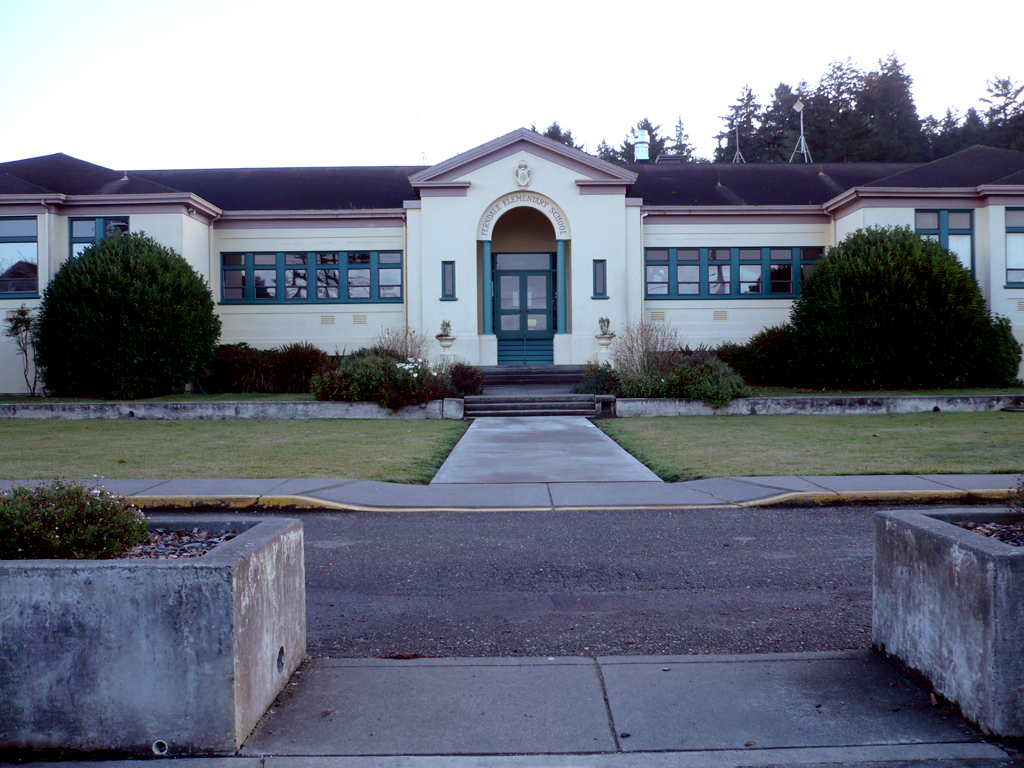
Ferndale Elementary School

Ferndale Elementary School is composed of several buildings: The main building was built in 1924, the gymnasium was built in 1967, and a multipurpose room, additional classrooms and computer space were added in 2001. All eighteen teachers are fully credentialed. The students at Ferndale Elementary are called the "Ferndale Mustangs", and their school colors are green and white.

== Ferndale High School ==
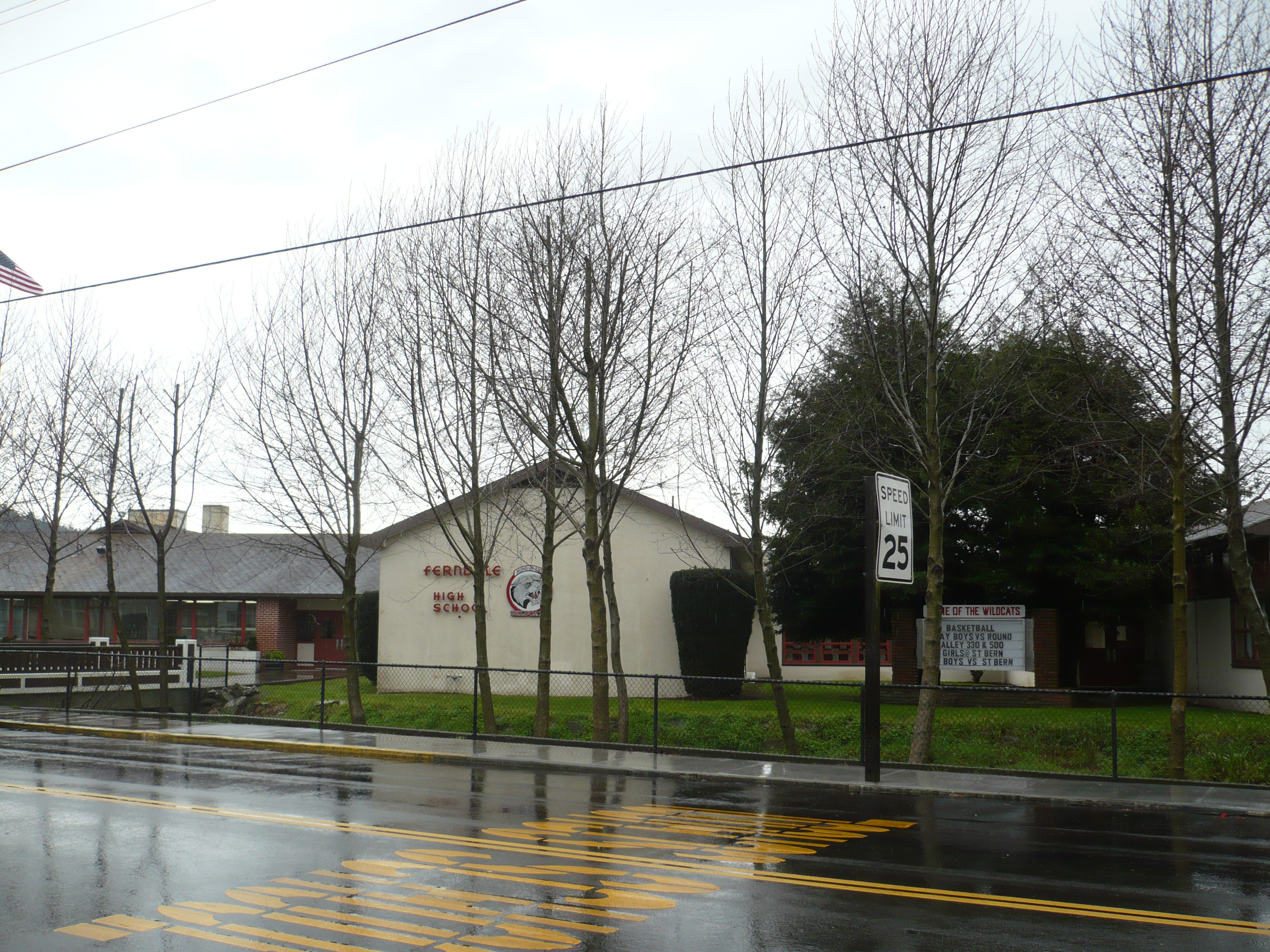
Ferndale High School

Ferndale High School is composed of several buildings. The main building was built in 1952 to provide offices, the school library and 11 classrooms. Other buildings include the 1975 gymnasium, and a building containing the woodshop and mechanics shop. All teachers are fully credentialed. The students at Ferndale High School are called "Wildcats", and their school colors are red and white.

== Notable students ==
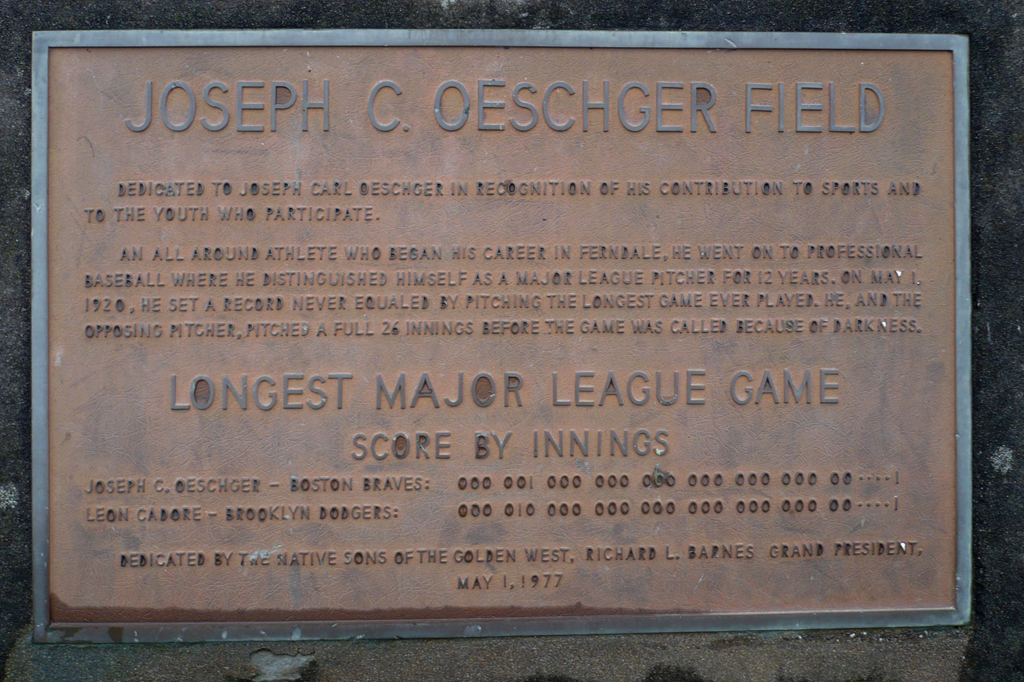
A plaque commemorating the longest major league baseball game, May 1, 1920, pitched by Ferndale High alumnus Joe Oeschger.

- Len Casanova, American football player
- Donald H. Clausen politician
- Sam Dungan, baseball player
- Frank Ferguson, actor
- Guy Fieri, chef
- Thomas E. Leavey, businessman
- Joe Oeschger, baseball player

== See also ==
- List of schools in Humboldt County, California
