= Thomas and Dorothy Leavey Foundation =

American foundation

The Thomas and Dorothy Leavey Foundation is a charitable foundation in Los Angeles, California.

== History ==
The foundation was established by Farmers Insurance Group co-founder Thomas E. Leavey and his wife Dorothy E. Risley Leavey in 1952. It has donated more than $200 million to institutions and charitable causes.

It is chaired by Kathleen McCarthy Leavey, the daughter of Dorothy and Thomas E. Leavey.

== Recipients ==
Despite the foundation's donations mainly remaining anonymous, some of the recipients of the foundations gifts are: Santa Clara University, Loyola Marymount University, Georgetown University, the University of Southern California, St. John's Health Center, California Hospital Medical Center, Freedoms Foundation at Valley Forge, the United Negro College Fund, Children's Hospital Los Angeles, and the Los Angeles County Music Center. The foundation also donated $10 million to the Archdiocese of Los Angeles to build a new cathedral to replace the Cathedral of St. Vibiana.

The Leavey Foundation often keeps its donations anonymous, but there are several buildings and programs that now carry the Leavey name:

- The Leavey Center at Georgetown University, known as the student center, provides recreational and meeting places for students, faculty and staff, as well as a 146-room hotel and conference center, the University bookstore and various eating facilities
- The Thomas and Dorothy Leavey Chair in the Foundations of American Freedom in the Department of Government at Georgetown University
- The Leavey School of Business at Santa Clara University
- The Leavey Activities Center at Santa Clara University is an indoor basketball arena which also houses athletic department offices and an academic center
- The Thomas and Dorothy Leavey Center for the Study of Los Angeles is a research center focused on public opinion surveys, exit polling, and leadership and community studies at Loyola Marymount University
- The Dorothy and Thomas E. Leavey Center, the Thomas and Dorothy Leavey Foundation Information Commons and the Leavey Residence Halls at Loyola Marymount University
- The Dorothy E. Leavey Family Resource Center at the Assistance League in Hollywood
- The Leavey Library is one of the two main undergraduate libraries at USC
- The Dorothy and Thomas Leavey Cancer Center at Northridge Hospital Medical Center, Northridge, California
- The Dorothy and Thomas Leavey Commons on the Chalon Campus of Mount St. Mary's College in Los Angeles
- The Leavey Awards honor excellence in private enterprise education and are administered by the Freedoms Foundation at Valley Forge
