= List of Humboldt State Lumberjacks in the NFL draft =

This is a list of Humboldt State Lumberjacks football players in the NFL draft.

== Key ==
B	Back	K	Kicker	NT	Nose tackle
C	Center	LB	Linebacker	FB	Fullback
DB	Defensive back	P	Punter	HB	Halfback
DE	Defensive end	QB	Quarterback	WR	Wide receiver
DT	Defensive tackle	RB	Running back	G	Guard
E	End	T	Offensive tackle	TE	Tight end

== Selections ==
Year	Round	Pick	Overall	Player	Team	Position
1970	11	16	276	Dan Hook	Green Bay Packers	LB
1971	8	4	186	Leonard Gotschalk	Philadelphia Eagles	C
1973	15	18	382	Mike Bettiga	San Francisco 49ers	WR
1976	10	19	284	Steve Kincannon	Houston Oilers	QB
1990	11	1	277	Dave Harper	Dallas Cowboys	LB
1991	7	12	179	Scotty Reagan	Minnesota Vikings	DT
1992	12	25	333	Freeman Baysinger	New England Patriots	WR
2018	3	30	94	Alex Cappa	Tampa Bay Buccaneers	T
