= Chris Butterfield =

American football player (born 1974)

Personal information
- Born: June 26, 1974 (age 51)

Career information
- College: Humboldt State

Career history
- 1997–1999: Portland Forest Dragons
- 2000: Oklahoma Wranglers
- 2001–2004: Los Angeles Avengers

Chris Butterfield (born June 26, 1974) is a former Arena Football League offensive lineman/defensive lineman for the Portland Forest Dragons (1997–1999), the Oklahoma Wranglers (2000), and the Los Angeles Avengers (2001–2004).

== Early life ==
Butterfield attended Arcata High School in Arcata, California, and was a star in football and wrestling. In football, he was a two-time All-League honoree and was unanimously voted the league's Defensive Player of the Year as a senior. In wrestling, as a senior, he was the county champion and placed tenth in the state.

== College career ==
Butterfield attended Humboldt State University, and was a four-year starter at center and nose guard, and a three-time All-Conference pick. As a senior, he was named the Columbia Football Association’s Offensive Player of the Year. As a junior, he won NCAA Division II All-America honors.
