= Mutual insurance =

Policyholder-owned risk compensation company

A mutual insurance company is an insurance company that is people centric, jointly owned and democratically controlled by its policyholders. It is a form of consumers' co-operative that as of 2013 accounted for 27.3% of the global insurance market helping protect 915 million policy holders globally. From a financial perspective, surpluses that are experienced by the mutual are either retained by the company for operational needs, shared among policy holders in the form of dividend distributions or reduced future premium. Mutual insurance differs from a stock-based or investor-owned insurance company which is owned by investors who have purchased company stock. Profits (rather than surpluses) in a stock company are either retained by the company or distributed to the investors without any guaranteed benefits to the policyholders.

== Governance ==
From a governance perspective, a mutual insurance company is jointly owned and democratically controlled by its policy holders. Policyholders, as joint owners of the enterprise, are given the opportunity to participate in the selection of the board of directors in various ways. In a direct form of participation, policy holders vote and directly elect the board members. In an indirect form of participation, member representatives are elected by the policyholders and it is those member representatives that make the eventual decision on the board of directors.

== History ==
The concept of mutual insurance originated in England in the late 17th century to cover losses due to fire. The mutual/casualty insurance industry began in the United States in 1752 when Benjamin Franklin established the Philadelphia Contributionship for the Insurance of Houses From Loss by Fire. Mutual property/casualty insurance companies exist now in nearly every country around the globe.

The global trade association for the industry, the International Cooperative and Mutual Insurance Federation, claims 216 members in 74 countries, in turn representing over 400 insurers. In North America the National Association of Mutual Insurance Companies (NAMIC), founded in 1895, is the sole representative of U.S. and Canadian mutual insurance companies in the areas of advocacy and education.

== See also ==
- Mutual aid
- Protection and indemnity insurance
- Reciprocal inter-insurance exchange: a type of insurance company which, similar to a mutual, is not owned by stockholders.
