= Fortuna Union Elementary School District =

School district in California, United States

Location
- 843 L St. Fortuna, California 95540 United States

Fortuna Union Elementary School District was a public school district in Humboldt County, California, United States. Effective July 1, 2012, it consolidated with Rohnerville Elementary School District to form Fortuna Elementary School District.
