= Randy Niemann =

American baseball player (born 1955)

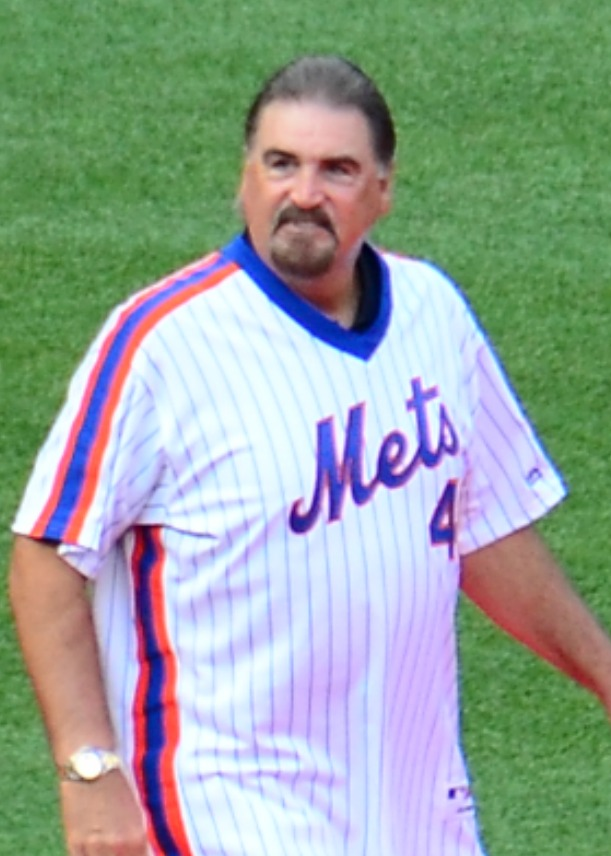
- Niemann in 2016
- Pitcher
- Born: November 15, 1955 (age 70); Scotia, California, U.S.
- Batted: Left Threw: Left

MLB debut
- May 20, 1979, for the Houston Astros

Last MLB appearance
- June 20, 1987, for the Minnesota Twins

MLB statistics
- Games pitched: 122
- Win–loss record: 7–8
- Earned run average: 4.64
- Strikeouts: 102
- Stats at Baseball Reference

Teams
- As player: Houston Astros (1979–1980); Pittsburgh Pirates (1982–1983); Chicago White Sox (1984); New York Mets (1985–1986); Minnesota Twins (1987); As coach: New York Mets (1997–1999, 2001–2002, 2009–2010); Boston Red Sox (2012)

Career highlights and awards
- World Series Champion (1986)

Randal Harold Niemann (born November 15, 1955) is an American professional baseball coach and a former pitcher who appeared in 122 Major League games, all but 10 in relief, in 1979–80 and 1982–87 for the Houston Astros, Pittsburgh Pirates, Chicago White Sox, New York Mets and Minnesota Twins. Niemann was a southpaw pitcher who stood 6 feet 4 inches (1.93 m) tall and weighed 200 pounds (91 kg).

== Playing career ==
Born in Scotia, California, Niemann attended Fortuna Union High School then College of the Redwoods.

Niemann originally signed with the New York Yankees after he was selected in the second round of the secondary phase of the 1975 Major League Baseball draft, and his active career spanned 14 pro seasons (1975–88). In the Major Leagues, he worked in 200 innings pitched, and allowed 219 hits and 82 bases on balls, with 102 strikeouts, three saves and three complete games. He won seven of 15 decisions (.467) and compiled a career earned run average of 4.64.

As a hitter, Niemann posted a .267 batting average (8-for-30) with 2 runs and 2 bases on balls in 33 plate appearances. Defensively, he handled 53 total chances (16 putouts, 37 assists) without an error for a perfect 1.000 fielding percentage.

== Coaching career ==
After retiring as an active player, Niemann became a coach and instructor in the New York Mets' organization for over two decades, serving as a minor league instructor (1988–96; 2000; 2003–08; 2011) and the club's Major League bullpen coach (1997–99; 2001–02; 2009–10).

Among the managers Niemann worked for was Bobby Valentine, and in 2012 he left the Mets' organization to serve under Valentine and pitching coach Bob McClure as the assistant pitching coach of the Boston Red Sox. On August 20, 2012, he was named Boston's head pitching coach and served through the end of the season, but was not retained by Valentine's successor, John Farrell.

In 2013, Niemann joined the St. Louis Cardinals' organization as pitching coach of the Single-A Palm Beach Cardinals, holding that position through 2017. In 2018, the Cardinals promoted him to minor league pitching coordinator.

Preceded by Bob McClure	Boston Red Sox pitching coach Aug. 20, 2012 – Oct. 3, 2012	Succeeded by Juan Nieves
