= Redway School (Humboldt County) =

Coordinates: 40°7′8.49″N 123°49′26.58″W

Location
- 344 Humboldt Avenue; Redway, California 95560; United States

Information
- School district: Southern Humboldt Unified School District
- Teaching staff: 18.2 (FTE) (as of 2007-08)
- Grades: K-6
- Enrollment: 251 (as of 2007-08)
- Student to teacher ratio: 13.8 (as of 2007-08)

Redway School is located in Southern Humboldt County, California. Redway School is a K-6 school serving 325 students in a 773-square-mile (2,000 km^{2}) area.

== See also ==
- List of Humboldt County Schools
- The Redway School, Milton Keynes, England
