= Reciprocal inter-insurance exchange =

Insurance type in the United States

A reciprocal inter-insurance exchange or simply a reciprocal in the United States is an unincorporated association in which subscribers exchange insurance policies to pool and spread risk. For consumers, reciprocal exchanges often offer similar policies to those offered by a stock company or a mutual insurance company. Notable reciprocal exchanges are managed by USAA, Farmers, and Erie.

== History ==
Reciprocals began in 1881 when dry-good merchants in New York were discontent with their experience with other insurers in covering their buildings. The store owners believed that they had well-maintained buildings and were being overcharged by risk rating methodologies used by insurers at the time. Because the merchants were well-capitalized and could absorb certain losses, they decided to self-insure to lower their insurance costs. Subscribers indemnified each other when a member suffered a loss, but the process of collecting from those who did not suffer and remitting funds to those who did suffer losses proved cumbersome. Reciprocal exchanges managed by attorneys-in-fact thus were organized to address this problem.

== How a reciprocal operates ==
"Reciprocal insurance" means insurance resulting from the mutual exchange of insurance contracts among persons in an unincorporated association under a common name through an attorney-in-fact having authority to obligate each person both as insured and insurer.

This definition implies three parties: the Subscribers (policyholders), the exchange (an unincorporated association), and the attorney-in-fact.

Each policyholder is a subscriber to the exchange or a "member". Subscribers do not "own" and are not "owners" of the exchange, as it is an unincorporated association and thus has neither legal personhood nor owners. However, subscribers often have a governance role over the exchange, such as an advisory committee or Board of Governors. In some reciprocal exchanges, operating surplus generated by the exchange belongs to the subscribers but is held by the exchange in subscriber savings accounts, and exchange members might be charged "policyholder surplus contributions" to fund the exchange's surplus. The attorney-in-fact may return unneeded money to the subscribers under some circumstances. Subscribers may be natural persons, LLCs or LPs, partnerships, or corporations.

The attorney-in-fact, using a power of attorney from each subscriber, is authorized to administer the exchange and run its day-to-day operations, including issuing policies, filing rates, managing investments and handling claims. The attorney-in-fact can solicit and admit new subscribers. The attorney-in-fact may be an individual, partnership or corporate entity. In exchange for its services, the attorney-in-fact receives payment from fees charged to the exchange or its members, often a percentage of premium. The AIF may be owned by the reciprocal (a proprietary reciprocal) or contracted from a third party (a non-proprietary reciprocal).

Reciprocal insurance policies are typically nonassessable, keeping the policyholders from being charged an additional amount of money if required by the exchange. Reciprocals may issue assessable policies, though the practicalities of collecting assessments from members (particularly in personal lines) makes the assessable model less commonly used.

Insurance in the United States is principally regulated by each of the states, as provided for by the McCarran–Ferguson Act. There is a considerable variation in how state law governs reciprocal exchanges. Some states have specific laws governing reciprocal exchanges, while others subsume regulation of reciprocal exchanges under the regulations governing captive insurers.

Reciprocals can be started directly by policyholders or by an attorney-in-fact. In theory, a small group of individuals or companies could band together to insure one another and form a reciprocal. In consumer insurance, more recently, entrepreneurs have formed attorneys-in-fact which then form reciprocals by providing the initial capital (often as a surplus note), attracting subscribers, and managing the exchange.

== Comparison to other forms of insurance ==
Reciprocals are sometimes confused with mutual insurance companies. While the products of stock companies, reciprocals, and mutuals may be practically indistinguishable to consumers, there are technical differences. A reciprocal is unincorporated; a mutual is incorporated and thus can claim to be "owned by our policyholders". However, in both a reciprocal and a mutual, it may be difficult for widely dispersed policyholders to force material changes in governance. A mutual insurance company is often self-managed, and policyholders may have a role in electing the board of directors. Mutuals are typically thought of as being not-for-profit, but mutuals can own for-profit stock insurance companies. While the reciprocal exchange itself is technically not-for-profit, it can accumulate surplus, the attorney-in-fact may have a profit motive, and the attorney-in-fact may have profit-seeking external shareholders who are not the subscribers. To build surplus, such as at inception or following a disaster, a reciprocal can request state regulators to allow it to rebuild surplus via policyholder surplus contributions.

Reciprocal exchanges are more commonly seen in personal lines than commercial lines, in part because commercial lines insurers can be organized via other means not available in personal lines. In 1981, Congress authorized the creation of risk retention groups (RRGs) to provide certain forms of commercial liability insurance. RRGs and multi-parent captives have similar characteristics to reciprocals, notably the concept of similarly situated parties agreeing to insure each other. However, RRGs and captives are restricted in their product offerings, membership, and governance. In some states, municipalities form reciprocals to cross-indemnify towns, cities, villages, and counties.

== Examples ==
- American Automobile Association (AAA)
- Erie Insurance Group
- Farmers Insurance Group
- PURE Insurance
- USAA (United Services Automobile Association)

== See also ==
- Captive insurance
- Limited liability company
- Limited partnership
- Mutual insurance
- Risk retention group
