= Bayside, California =

Unincorporated community in California, United States

Bayside
- Unincorporated community
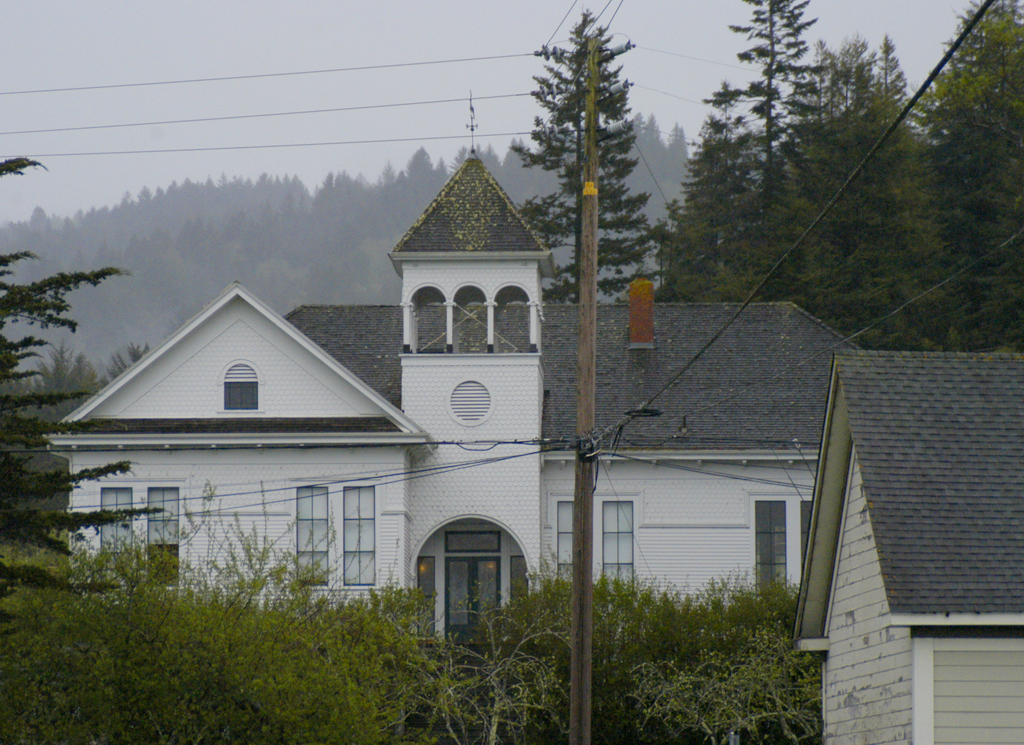
- The old Jacoby Creek School is on the U.S. National Historic Register #1985000353.

- Location in California
- Coordinates: 40°50′32″N 124°03′49″W
- Country: United States
- State: California
- County: Humboldt
- Elevation: 33 ft (10 m)

Bayside is an unincorporated community 2.25 miles (3.6 km) south-southeast of Arcata, at an elevation of 33 feet (10 m) in Humboldt County, California, United States. The ZIP Code is 95524, the area code is 707. The relatively large area was originally covered by large, ancient Coast Redwood trees down to what was the edge of a significantly larger Humboldt Bay at high tide. Later, the mammoth redwoods (especially those near the Jacoby Creek) made it the natural placement of some of the area's earliest redwood lumber operations. A rock quarry was located in the area's hills, which form the beginning of the Coast Ranges, the source of water for an early public water system for the City of Arcata. Today, Bayside provides Arcata a buffer from Eureka's northward expansion along US Route 101 and the area, with the exception of some business and public buildings, is largely rural, with homes and small ranches dotting the landscape. Second growth forests exist mostly apart from cleared lands, which show some evidence of the extensive redwood forest that once existed in the form of large stumps. Some of the area's older Victorian era houses (many are very plain, early Gothic Revival examples), are still present on the Old Arcata Road, the original main road connecting Arcata to Eureka. Jacoby Creek runs alongside a road of the same name from the hills in the direction of the Bay.

== History ==
Prior to white settlement in the 1850s Wiyot Indian villages dotted the area and the present main roads were established trails. The first whites to settle in Bayside were members of the Quear family.

Jacoby Creek was originally named "Jacoby River" for early settler Augustus Jacoby, whose brick store in Arcata sheltered settlers in times of trouble. Jacoby owned and worked a large rock quarry about 5 miles southeast of Bayside which produced limestone rock for early armoring of the Humboldt Bay jetties and other projects. Jacoby did not live long in the area, but relocated to New York, where he died in 1892.

William Carson's first logging claim was in Bayside, and he brought in workers from New Brunswick, Canada who settled in the area. The area provided redwood timber and part of the area became known as "Stump Town." In 1907, a large jam of logs and debris that had piled up in Jacoby Creek due to logging operations came loose, cut a new channel of the creek and inundated about 80 acres (32 ha) of dairy land.

The first post office at Bayside opened in 1886. Even with its own post office, Bayside was partially annexed into the City of Arcata and is policed by Arcata police and the county sheriff. The original Jacoby Creek School was built in 1903 and added to the National Register of Historic Places in 1985. The Bayside Grange was built in 1941 as a meeting hall for farmers and is still used as an all-purpose hall for the community.

== Infrastructure ==
Bayside is bisected by Old Arcata Road, which comes to a t-intersection with Jacoby Creek Road in front of the historic Jacoby Creek School and the Bayside Temperance Hall built in 1882. Another main road in Bayside is Golf Course Road, which leads to a full size golf course at the top of a hill.

== Education ==
Jacoby Creek Elementary School, is a charter public K-8 elementary school, which installed a 30,000 watt solar power array to save 25% of the facility energy costs. Students graduating to high school attend Arcata High School.

The Mistwood Educational center is a private TK-12, non profit school in Bayside. Founded in 1980, the school currently has a student population of 21. Mistwood Educational center uses the Bayside Temperance hall building for operations.
