= Melinda Ballard =

US activist for insurance policyholders

Melinda Ballard (April 21, 1958 - June 2, 2013) was an American businesswoman and activist for insurance policyholders. In 1999, she sued her insurer over mold damage in her 22-room family home in Dripping Springs, Texas. Her three-year-old son, Reese Allison(1996-2021), developed an unexplained respiratory condition in March 1999. Her husband, Ron Allison (1970-2021), was later shown to have signs of Alzheimer's disease. On April 1, 1999, after the start of Ron and Reese‘s symptoms, Melinda took a Southwest Airlines flight and became ill, coughing up blood. Air-quality expert and investigator Bill Holder, who happened to be sitting in the adjacent seat, asked if there was a leak in their home which she confirmed. He speculated that her ill health could be due to a toxic species of mold in their 12,000 square foot home, which was based on the movie version of "Tara", the home of Scarlett O'Hara in Gone With the Wind. Their case started as a single claim for water damage and turned into a case about mold contamination in the entire house. They were one of the first cases to highlight the dangerous results of toxic mold and increased public awareness of the dangers of mold.

She and her husband, Ron Allison, were awarded $32 million in 2001 as a result of a lawsuit against Farmers Insurance for their failure to pay claims relating to mold damage. The award was later reduced to $4 million on appeal however a subsequent settlement awarded a larger, confidential sum to the family. As a result of her case and the attention she received, Ballard founded Policyholders of America, a consumer advocacy group and homeowner’s insurance information clearinghouse in around 2004.

Melinda died in 2013 at the age of 55.
