= Old Jacoby Creek School =

- U.S. National Register of Historic Places
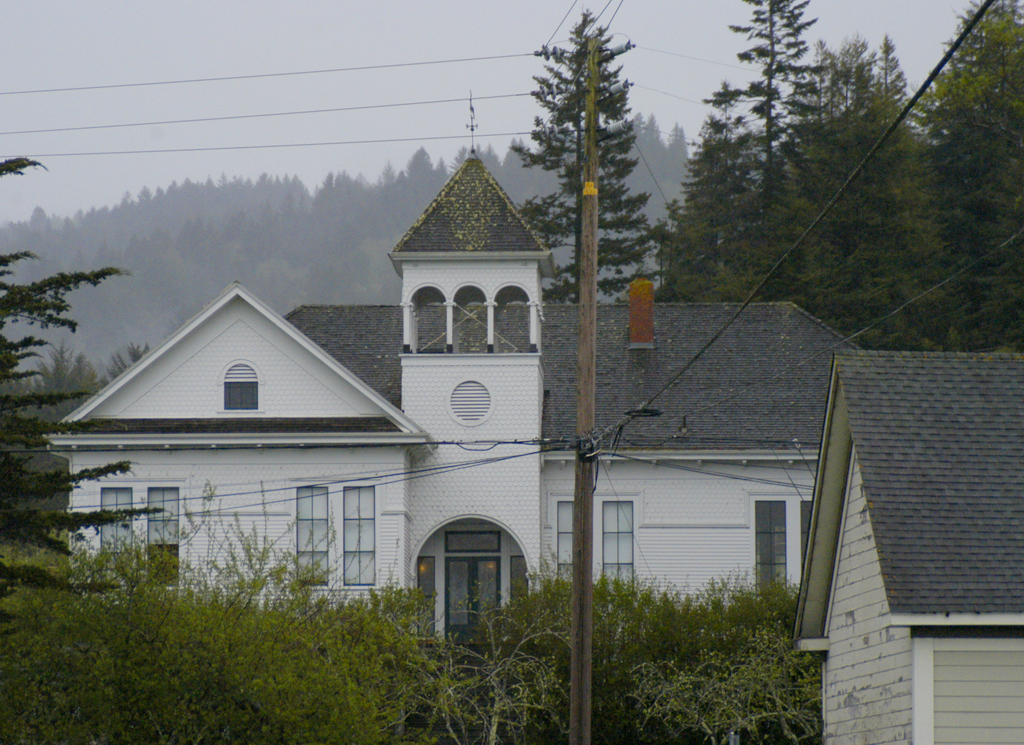
- The Old Jacoby Creek School is surrounded by a high windbreak.

- Location within California Location within the United States
- Location: 2212 Jacoby Creek Road, Bayside, California
- Coordinates: 40°50′34″N 124°03′47″W
- Built: 1903
- Architect: W. G. Mohn
- NRHP reference No.: 85000353
- Added to NRHP: 1985-02-28

The Old Jacoby Creek School is an historic building located in Bayside, California. A bell tower serves as the dominant architectural element and the structure contains both weatherboard and shingling on the exterior.

== History ==
The original school was active from 1903 to 1924 but the structure was not listed on the National Register of Historic Places until 1985, by which time it had become an individual residence.

In 2003, the building briefly housed the Laurel Tree Learning Center charter school. However, the school was forced to move because of serious code violations including no sprinklers or alarm system.

In 2007, the building was purchased and renovated (including the addition of solar power) by Internet audio streaming and podcasting service provider StreamGuys and currently houses their main business and support offices, as well as the business offices for Humboldt Hot Sauce, the workout studio for Old School Hot Yoga, and two private apartments.

== See also ==
- National Register of Historic Places listings in Humboldt County, California
