= Green Point School District =

School district in California, United States

Green Point Elementary School District

Location
- 180 Valkensar Lane; Blue Lake, California 95525 United States

Other information
- Website: www.humboldt.k12.ca.us/greenpoint_sd/

Green Point Elementary School District was a public school district based in Humboldt County, California, United States. It was annexed into Blue Lake Union Elementary School District on July 1, 2025.
