= Jacoby Creek Charter School District =

School district in California

Address
- 1617 Old Arcata Road Bayside, California, 95524; United States
- Coordinates: 40°50′48.77″N 124°4′1.14″W

District information
- Type: Public
- Grades: K–8
- NCES District ID: 0618660

Students and staff
- Students: 454
- Teachers: 20.87 (FTE)
- Staff: 17.26 (FTE)
- Student–teacher ratio: 21.75

Other information
- Website: www.jcsk8.org

Jacoby Creek Charter School District is located in Bayside, a small community, near Arcata, California, United States. The district oversees public education through grade 8 in a portion of west central Humboldt County, California.

The school it operates is the Jacoby Creek School in Bayside. The school has installed a 30,000 watt solar power array.

== School board and staff ==
The school board consists of five members:

- Danielle Witten (President, Term Expires Dec. 2026)
- Cheryl Svehla (Term Expires Dec. 2026)
- Gabriela Carter (Term Expires Dec. 2028)
- Aaron Hohl (Term Expires Dec. 2028)
- Lucas Vought (Term Expires Dec. 2026)

Melanie Nannizzi currently serves as District Superintendent/School Principal.

== Awards ==
- 2017 US Department of Education National Blue Ribbon School
