= Mike Bettiga =

American football player (born 1950)

- Bettiga playing for the San Francisco 49ers in 1974

No. 80
- Position: Wide receiver

Personal information
- Born: September 10, 1950 (age 76); Scotia, California, U.S.
- Listed height: 6 ft 3 in (1.91 m)
- Listed weight: 193 lb (88 kg)

Career information
- High school: Fortuna Union (Fortuna, California)
- College: Humboldt State
- NFL draft: 1973: 15th round, 382nd overall pick

Career history
- San Francisco 49ers (1974)

Awards and highlights
- All-Far Western Conference (football, 1972); Division All-American (track & field, twice); College of the Redwoods Hall of Fame (1990); Humboldt Athletics Hall of Fame (1994)
- Stats at Pro Football Reference

Michael John Bettiga (pronounced "Bet-TEE-ga") (born September 10, 1950) is an American former professional football player who was a wide receiver for the San Francisco 49ers of the National Football League (NFL) in 1974. A multi-sport star, Bettiga was named to All-Golden Valley Conference teams for basketball and football at the junior college level and later set a series of school records at Humboldt State University running the 120-yard high hurdles. He was inducted into the Humboldt Athletics Hall of Fame in 1994 for track and football.

== Biography ==
=== Early life ===
Bettiga was born September 10, 1950 in Scotia, California, a mill town on California's North Coast.

He attended Fortuna Union High School in Fortuna, California, where he was a multi-sport athlete, running high hurdles and high jumping for the track and field team, playing basketball for the Fortuna varsity squad, and playing outfield for the Fortuna American Legion baseball team.

Bettiga did not play high school football but earned two letters in basketball and four in track at Fortuna High.

=== College career ===
In the fall of 1968, Bettiga enrolled at College of the Redwoods, a junior college located near Eureka, California, where he played basketball and ran track. Particularly accomplished as a scorer for the College of the Redwoods Corsairs on the basketball court, team captain Bettiga was named to the 1970 All-Golden Valley Conference basketball team.

During the 1970 season, Bettiga also began to make his mark on the football field as a "number one" wide receiver for College of the Redwoods. His combination of size, speed, and leaping ability made him a potent scoring threat, and he was named by coaches to the 1970 All-Golden Valley Conference first team in December of that year. Bettiga was instrumental in helping College of the Redwoods win its third straight California state junior college football championship in 1970 and as a split end was recognized with an award for top offensive line player in the championship game. He was voted 1970 Northwestern California Athlete of the Year.

After graduating from College of the Redwoods with an associate degree, in spring 1971 Bettiga transferred to Humboldt State College—now known as California State Polytechnic University, Humboldt—in Arcata, California, where he immediately participated on the school track team. That season he set a school record of 14.6 seconds in the 120-yard high hurdles, the first of a series of records during two years at Humboldt State, culminating in a 13.9 in the 100-meter high hurdles at a meet with San Francisco State in April 1972. He subsequently won the NCAA college title for schools of his division with a time of 13.8 in the 110-meter high hurdles, but he failed to advance from the qualifying round in the same event at the 1972 NCAA National Track and Field Championships held in Eugene, Oregon.

During his college career, Bettiga was twice named an NCAA All-American in track and field.

Bettiga also continued to play basketball at Humboldt State, earning two letters for the Lumberjacks.

He also continued to make a splash with the football team, whose offense was touted as an "aerial circus" during his 1972 senior season. At split end, Bettiga was the favorite target of Lumberjacks quarterback Gary Peterson and both he as a receiver and the team as a whole were number two in the Far Western Conference by mid-October. On October 21, in his best college performance, he ran for 141 yards and scored 2 touchdowns against Hayward State.

The 1972 college football season ended with Bettiga racking up 41 catches for 732 yards gained (17.9 yards per catch), with 6 touchdowns scored. He was elected the team's Most Valuable Player for 1972 by his teammates, and was chosen by a poll of league coaches as a member of the 1972 All-Far Western Conference team.

Bettiga ended his two-year career at Humboldt State with 81 catches for 1,461 yards (18.0 yards per reception), with 13 touchdowns scored.

=== Professional career ===
Bettiga's Division-II collegiate exploits were noted by professional football scouts. In January 1973, he was selected in the 15th round of the 1973 NFL draft (#382 overall) by the San Francisco 49ers. He expressed misgivings about going to the 49ers, with their laden stable of wide receivers, saying: "I would have liked to go where they didn't have all of the wide receivers in the world. But heck, I don't care. I just want the chance. It's a once in a lifetime chance and I was hoping to get drafted. I'll just wait for them to contact me." He declined a 1972 invitation to try out for the United States Summer Olympics team in favor of football.

In April 1973 Bettiga inked a two-year contract with the 49ers. He was one of 34 draftees and undrafted free agents invited to the 1973 49ers training camp at University of California at Santa Barbara.

Bettiga prepared for the Niners' camp perfecting his pass routes and catching balls from Humboldt State coach Fred Whitmire, a former Little All-Coast quarterback, with emphasis on running the shorter "out" routes common in the pro game. He talked himself into the idea of being able to stick with the receiver-laden San Francisco club: "I've got a real good chance to make the ball club. But I'm hoping that if I don't, I'll get picked up by somebody else."

Bettiga's time at camp was cursed by illness. He was hospitalized for two days with strep throat, missing eight practices. He managed to make it back, however, and was the surprise starter at flanker announced by head coach Dick Nolan for an early August pre-season game against the Cleveland Browns.

Despite his bumpy training camp, Bettiga's size and physical gifts were appreciated and he was named to the 49ers' 1973 47-man roster. He was inactive for almost the entire season and never saw game action, stockpiled by the team as a member of the practice squad.

During the off-season Bettiga spent time in the weight room to put muscle on his track star's frame, reporting to camp weighing 193 lbs, 12 lbs over his 1972 playing weight. In 1974 he found a place on the 49ers active roster, seeing action in 10 games as a member of the special teams unit.

Bettiga dislocated his shoulder in the 49ers' away win against the Chicago Bears on November 17, 1974. He signed a $30,000 contract with the 49ers for the 1975 season, but was knocked out of action by another shoulder injury in an August 10 preseason game against the Cleveland Browns. He was released by the 49ers at the beginning of September 1975, having played in 10 NFL games.

=== Lawsuit against 49ers ===
In summer 1976, Bettiga filed suit against the 49ers for $5,000 in general damages and $1 million in punitive damages, alleging the team refused to pay him his $30,000 salary for 1975 after he was injured. His attorney stated: "He was injured, we contend, in preseason games against the Cleveland Browns on August 10 of last year and reinjured in an exhibition against the Los Angeles Rams on August 16. His contract provides that if he is injured and can't play he is entitled to his salary. We're suing for that." and that NFL Commissioner Pete Rozelle had not appointed a third physician to resolve the disagreement between the 49ers' physician and Bettiga's as required under the contract.

=== Later career and recognition ===
During his stint with the 49ers, Bettiga worked in a sawmill during the off-season.

Bettiga coached track at College of the Redwoods in 1973 and 1974 and starting in 1974 also taught physical education. He graduated from Humboldt State in 1975 with a bachelor's degree in physical education with a minor in history, and moved the same year to Fortuna High School, where he coached track, football, basketball, and tennis.

Bettiga was inducted into the College of the Redwoods Hall of Fame in 1990 and into the Humboldt Athletics Hall of Fame in 1994 for football and track and field.
