= Six Rivers Charter High School =

Location
- 1720 M Street; Arcata, California 95521

Information
- School type: Charter high school
- Established: 2004
- Principal: Jen Coleman
- Grades: 9 - 12
- Enrollment: 101 (2014-2015)
- Colors: Pink/Maroon and Black
- Mascot: Pirates
- Website: sixriverscharter.nohum.org

Six Rivers Charter High School (SRCHS) is a WASC accredited charter school part of the Northern Humboldt Union High School District. It is located on Arcata High School's campus at 1720 M Street in downtown Arcata, California. The school charter places a limit on the number of students in attendance at one hundred.

The school opened on August 30, 2004. The founding principal was Chris Hartley, later elected as the Humboldt County Superintendent of Schools.
