= Cutten Elementary School District =

School district in California, United States

Location
- 4182 Walnut Dr. Eureka, California 95503 United States

District information
- Grades: K–6
- Superintendent: Susan Ivey
- Schools: 2
- NCES District ID: 0610380

Students and staff
- Students: 582
- Teachers: 29.6 (FTE)
- Staff: 47.63 (FTE)
- Student–teacher ratio: 19.66

Other information
- Website: cuttensd.org

Cutten Elementary School District is a public school district in Humboldt County, California.
