= Fortuna Elementary School District =

School district in California, United States

Fortuna Union Elementary School District

Location
- 500 9th St. Fortuna, California 95540 United States

District information
- Established: July 1, 2012

Other information
- Website: humboldt.k12.ca.us/fortuna_sd/

Fortuna Elementary School District is a public school district based in Humboldt County, California, United States, created from the consolidation of Rohnerville and Fortuna Union Elementary School Districts effective July 1, 2012.
