= Rohnerville Elementary School District =

School district in California, United States

Location
- 3850 Rohnerville Rd. Fortuna, California 95540 United States

Rohnerville Elementary School District was a public school district based in Humboldt County, California, United States. Effective July 1, 2012, it consolidated with Fortuna Union Elementary School District to form Fortuna Elementary School District.
