= Assistance League =

Assistance League is a national nonprofit organization in the United States Established in 1919, it is based in Burbank, California. The mission statement is, "Assistance League engages and empowers volunteers to strengthen our communities."

There are 95 chapters. Each chapter focuses on helping their community with philanthropic programs ranging from donating classroom supplies, clothing and books to supplying teddy bears to law enforcement in giving to traumatized children, and providing Assault Survival Kits of new clothing at hospitals for assault survivors.

The Assistance League consists of Chapter Members (who volunteer to staff Thrift Stores and other events), Assisteens (high school youth), and Auxiliary members.

== History ==
Assistance League was established in 1919 by the philanthropic efforts of Anne Banning (daughter-in-law of Phineas Banning) and Ada Edwards Laughlin (daughter-in-law of Homer Laughlin) to form Assistance League of Southern California. Anne Banning, was a leading philanthropist of her time, with a mission to aid families in distress as a result of World War I. Her vision to provide service to all in need, regardless of their race, religion or culture, laid the foundation for the future of the organization. The first Assistance League thrift shop opened as a revenue source for the philanthropic programs: Day Nursery, Girl’s Club, and others.

In the 1930s, the Assistance League called on daughters and granddaughters of its members to assist in various philanthropic projects. This participation developed into Assisteens, a youth focused program of volunteerism for grades seven to twelve.

After 1935, neighboring communities sprouted affiliate chapters and a national representation was beginning to organize under the guidelines of Ada Edwards Laughlin. In August 1949, National Assistance League was formed.

Since its inception, the Assistance League has had the support of Hollywood celebrities participating in volunteerism and charitable events. It was not uncommon to see celebrities like Jean Harlow reading stories to children in need, Claudia Dell waiting tables for a good cause or Shirley Temple Black, who was actively involved as a member, running the register at an Assistance League gift shop.

== Awards and honors ==
The Assistance League and its chapters have won numerous awards including being nominated and winning the All-Star Award for Make a Difference Day in 2012 and 2013, an annual recognition to individuals and organizations making the biggest impact nationally through volunteerism.
