= Northern Humboldt Union High School District =

School district in California, United States

Location
- 2755 Mckinleyville Ave. McKinleyville, California 95519 United States

District information
- Motto: Developing caring and adaptable individuals who embrace opportunities and meet challenges in their future.
- Grades: 9–12
- Superintendent: Roger McDonald
- Accreditation: WASC accredited
- Schools: Six Rivers Charter High School, Arcata High School, McKinleyvillie High School, Tsurai High School, Pacific Coast High School, NH Community Day School, and Riverbend Education Program

Other information
- Website: www.nohum.org

Northern Humboldt Union High School District is a public school district in Humboldt County, California, United States. The Northern Humboldt Union High School District operates two four-year high schools, Arcata High School and McKinleyville High School; two small continuation high schools, Pacific Coast High and Tsurai High; one charter school, Six Rivers Charter High School; one community day school, NH Community Day School; and one mental health high school program, Riverbend Education Program. The school district spans across two of the major cities in Humboldt County. The superintendent Roger McDonald was appointed on May 29, 2017.

== Sandia computer donation ==
In the summer of 2015, Northern Humboldt Union High School District received a donation of 242 desktop computers from Sandia National Laboratories valued at over $200,000. The donation was facilitated by Mitch Williams, electronics technologist at Sandia National Laboratories, through the company's K–12 donation program. Deployment of the computers was handed partially by students.
