= Ferndale High School (California) =

Public high school in Ferndale, California

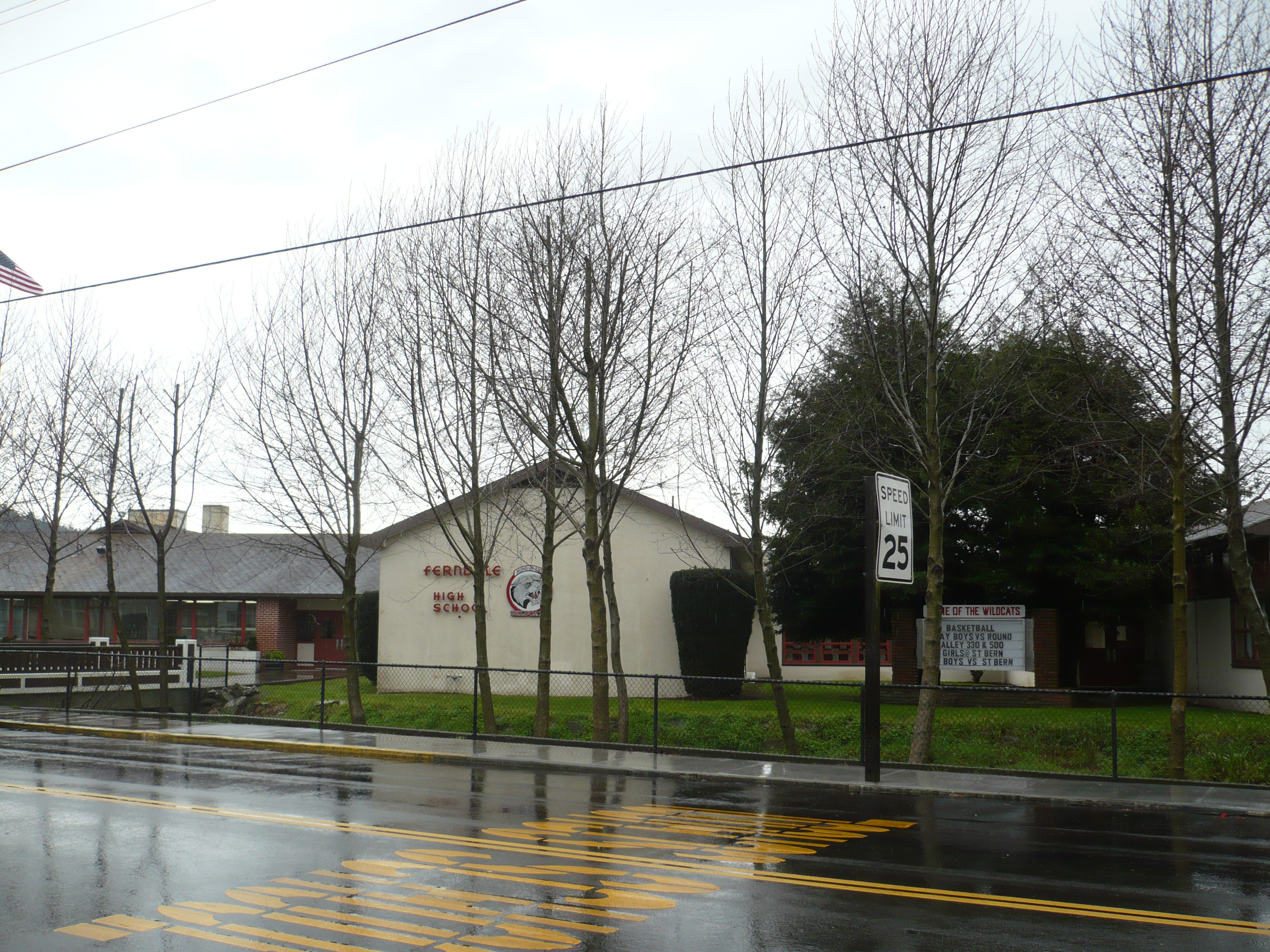

Location
- Ferndale, California; United States; 40°35′05″N 124°15′37″W

Information
- Type: Public
- Principal: Jeremy Griffith
- Enrollment: 145 (2025–2026)
- Student to teacher ratio: 11:1
- Colors: Red and white
- Nickname: Wildcats
- Website: fhs.ferndalek12.org

Ferndale High School is a four-year public high school in Ferndale, California, United States, serving ninth through twelfth grade. The school's enrollment area comprises Ferndale and part of the Wildcat Hills in Humboldt County, California.

== History ==
Ferndale High School was established in 1904, created from the unification of smaller school districts across the Eel River Valley. This included Port Kenyon, Island School, Grant School, Salt River School, Coffee Creek School, Grizzly Bluff School, and Pleasant Point School. The original building was in use from 1907 to 1951. In 1952, the building was replaced by what is now the present high school facility. The original main building built in 1952 contained offices, the school library, and 11 classrooms. Other buildings include the gymnasium (built in 1974), and a building containing the woodshop and mechanics shop.

== Demographics ==
As of 2026, Ferndale High School has a student population of 145 that is 0.7% black, 2.1% Native American, 4.1% multiracial, 22.1% Hispanic, and 71% white. The school's graduation rate is 90%.

== Academics ==
According to the U.S. News & World Report, the AP participation rate at Ferndale High School is 60%.

== Extracurriculars ==
Ferndale High School's sports program offers softball, volleyball, wrestling, baseball, tennis, basketball, track and field, golf, soccer, and football. Ferndale won its 14th California football sectional title and the California Interscholastic Federation Division 7-AA football championship in 2023. The girls' soccer team won the California North Coast Section championship in 2023.

The school has a long-time sports rivalry with neighboring Fortuna Union High School. The first Ferndale Wildcat versus Fortuna Huskies "Milk Can" football game was played in 1945. Excluding a 20 year hiatus, the Milk Can football game has been played each year since. In 2011, the Milk Can was stolen from Ferndale High School during a break-in by three Fortuna High School students, thrown over a bluff, and later recovered by police.

== Notable alumni ==
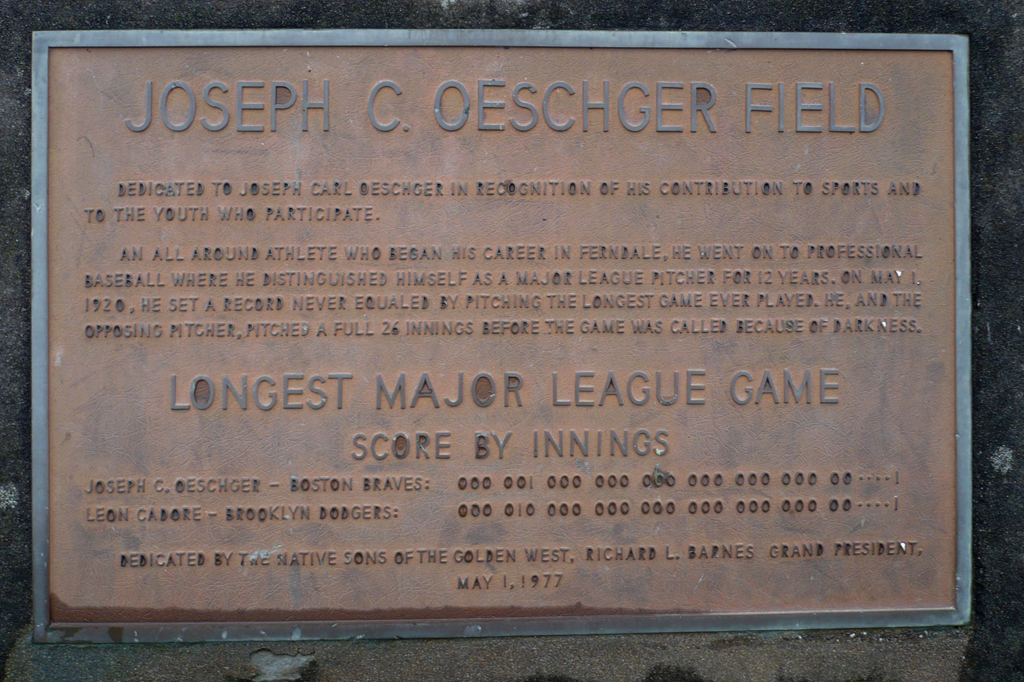
A plaque commemorating the longest major league baseball game, May 1, 1920, pitched by Ferndale High alumnus Joe Oeschger.

- Len Casanova, American football player and coach
- Donald H. Clausen, politician
- Sam Dungan, baseball player
- Frank Ferguson, actor
- Guy Fieri, chef
- Thomas E. Leavey, businessman
- Joe Oeschger, baseball player
