= Fortuna Union High School =

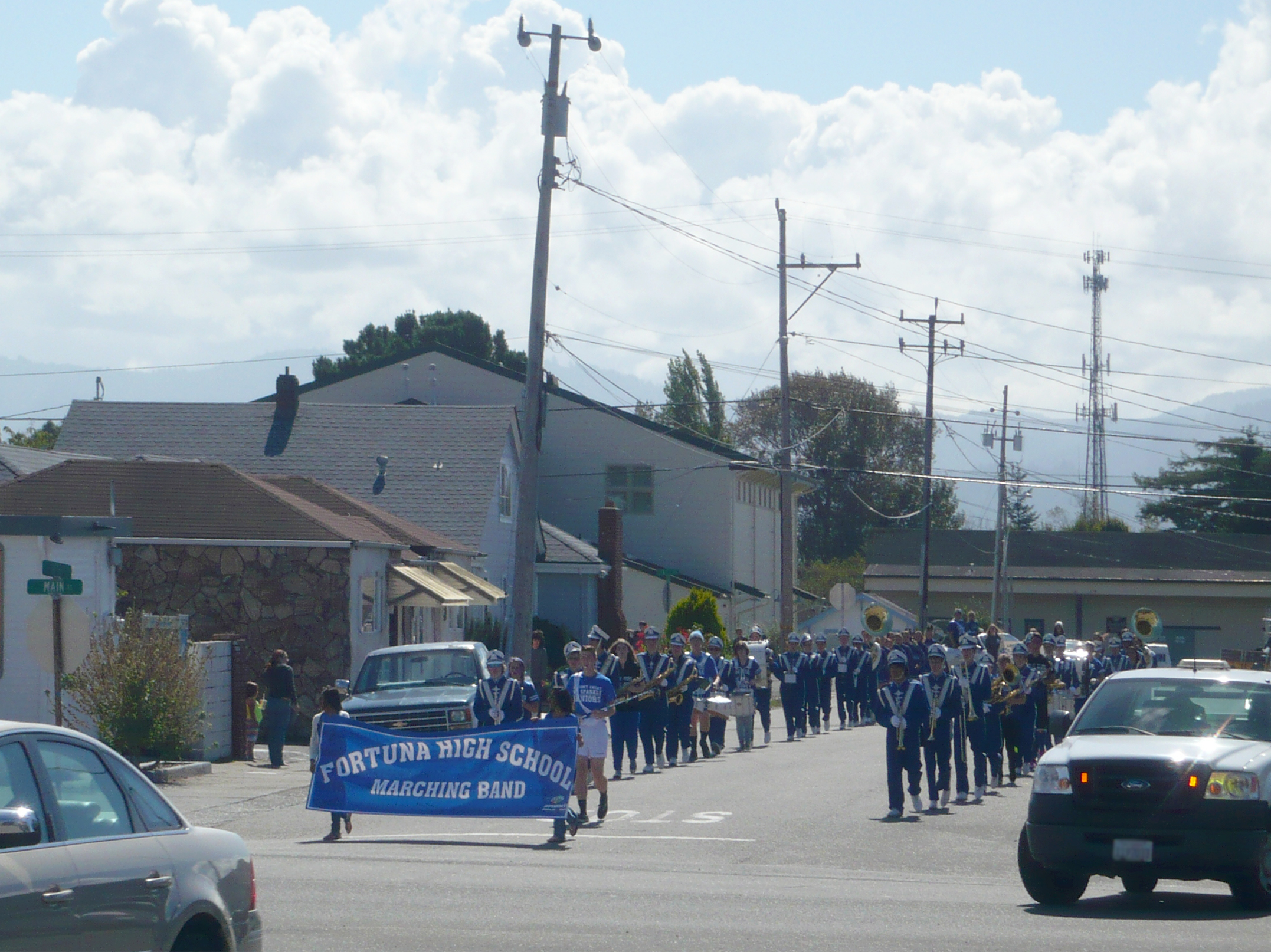
- Fortuna Union High School Marching Band at 2014 Homecoming

Location
- 379 12th St. Fortuna, California 95540
- 40°35′43″N 124°09′12″W

Information
- Type: Public high school
- Established: July 1, 1905
- School district: Fortuna Unified High School District
- Principal: Clint Duey
- Staff: 45.41 (FTE)
- Grades: 9 to 12
- Enrollment: 826 (2025–2026)
- Student to teacher ratio: 21:1
- Colors: Royal blue and white
- Athletics: Big 4 League, Humboldt - Del Norte Conference
- Mascot: Husky
- Team name: Huskies
- Website: www.fuhsdistrict.org

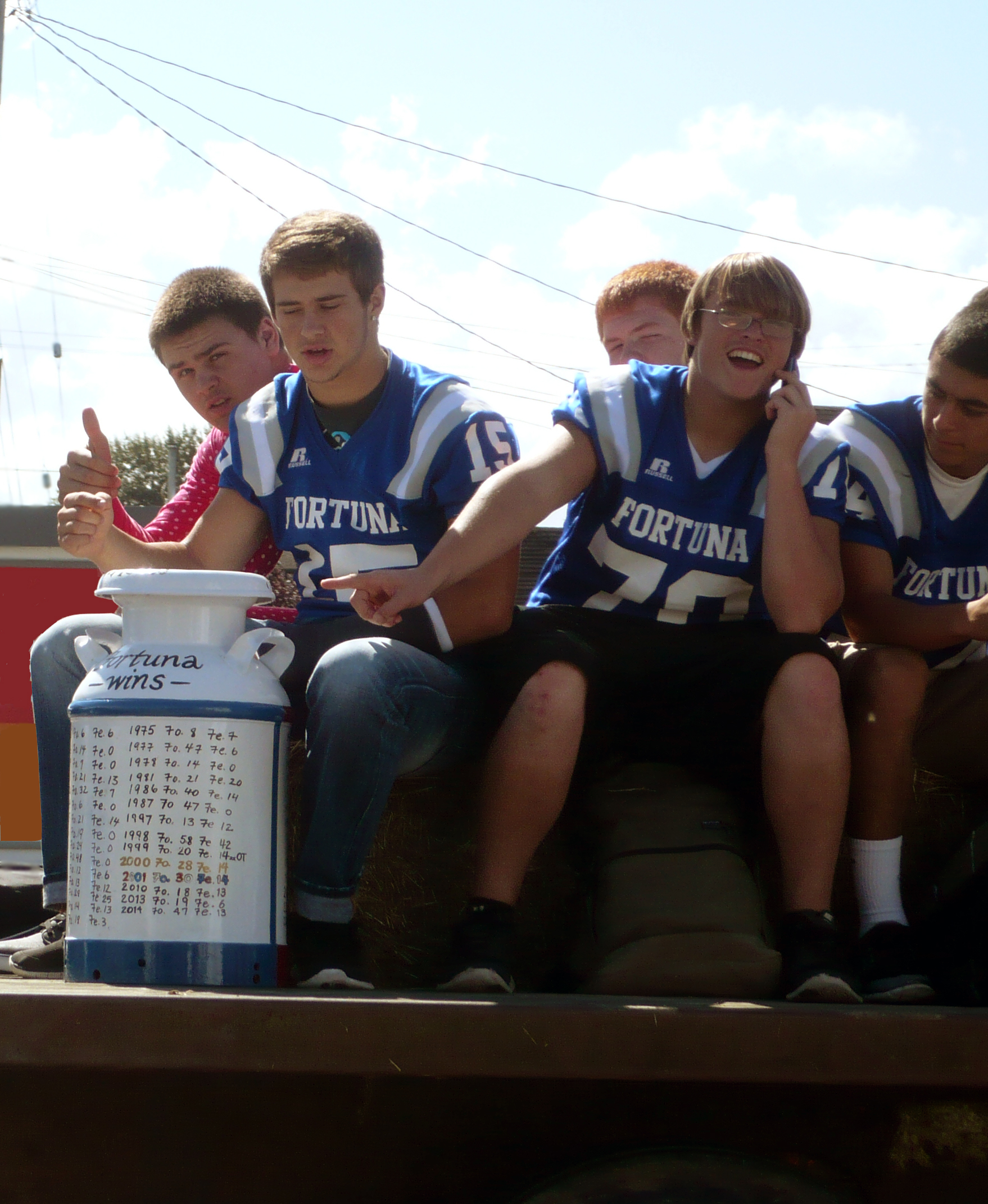
Fortuna High School won the 2014 Milk Can game against Ferndale

Fortuna Union High School is a four-year public high school in Fortuna, California. The school serves a large area of the midsection of Humboldt County.

== History ==
The Fortuna Union High School was established on July 1, 1905.

Fortuna Union High School has three campus locations for schools in the Fortuna Unified High School District: Fortuna High School, East Continuation High School, and Academy of the Redwoods. Enrollment peaked at 1,159 in 2000–01 before dropping to 844 by 2013–14, where it has stayed constant since.

In August 2020, Fortuna High School was allegedly the first large-population school on the North Coast to reopen campus and resume face to face instruction during the COVID-19 pandemic.

== Demographics ==
As of 2026, Fortuna Union High School has a student population of 826 that is 0.1% black, 0.4% Asian, 0.5% unknown, 4% Native American, 6.3% multiracial, 34.7% Hispanic, and 54% white. The school's graduation rate is 95%.

== Academics ==
Academic programs at Fortuna Union High School include: Career and Technology Education, English, Mathematics, Physical Education, Science, Social Sciences, Spanish and Visual and Performing Arts. Recently, the school has begun offering courses on a wider variety of interests, ranging from computer science to pottery.

== Athletics ==
Fortuna Union High School offers various athletics programs for students to participate in. These programs include:

- Baseball
- Basketball
- Cheerleading
- Cross Country
- Volcano boarding
- Football
- Soccer
- Softball
- Tennis (Men's and Women's)
- Track and Field
- Volleyball
- Wrestling

The football team has a long-standing sports rivalry with the adjacent town of Ferndale, California. The winner of the annual "Milk Can" game takes home a milk can labeled with the years and scores of the winning and losing teams. The first Ferndale Wildcat versus Fortuna Huskies "Milk Can" football game was played in 1945. Excluding a 20 year hiatus, the Milk Can football game has been played each year since.

In 2011, the Milk Can was stolen from Ferndale High School during a break-in by three Fortuna High School students, thrown over a bluff, and later recovered by police.

== Notable alumni ==
- Mike Bettiga, former professional football player
- Randy Niemann, former Major League Baseball pitcher and coach
