= Arcata High School =

Location
- 1720 M Street; Arcata, California 95521; United States; 40°52′36″N 124°5′21″W

Information
- School type: Public high school
- Founded: 1894
- School district: Northern Humboldt Union High School District
- Principal: Kristin Ferderber
- Teaching staff: 52.93 (FTE)
- Grades: 9 - 12
- Enrollment: 1,007 (2024-2025)
- Student to teacher ratio: 19.03
- Colors: Black and Orange
- Nickname: Tigers
- Website: https://arcatahighschool.nohum.org/

Arcata High School is the primary public high school in Arcata, serving students in grades 9 through 12. It is located in Arcata, California and is part of the Northern Humboldt Union High School District.

== History ==
Arcata High School was the first high school in Humboldt County, established in the late 19th century. In August 1894, an election was held involving the elementary school districts of Janes, Bayside, and Jacoby. The vote resulted in favor of founding a new high school. It was determined that the high school should be placed in Arcata, and named Arcata Union High School.

In 1903, in order to support the growth of the high school, a 6,000 dollar bond passed. This bond was used to construct the first school building on 16th and G streets, in Arcata. In 1912, enrollment reached 100 students. New buildings opened in 1920, 1924, and 1943. In 1944, enrollment had reached 500 students and 21 teachers were employed. In 1947, construction began on a new classroom wing and gymnasium. In 1952, the school's metal shop building, and science wing, began construction. In 1956, construction began on the wood shop building.

== Academics ==
Arcata High School has an Advanced Placement program for those who wish to obtain college credit and take more advanced classes. Students at Arcata High School are also given the opportunity to earn college credit by taking classes at the nearby colleges.

The high school contains on campus both a charter school, Six Rivers Charter High School, and a continuation school, Pacific Coast High.

== Arts ==
Arcata High School has a number of special programs through the Arcata Arts Institute, which helps students with a particular interest in the arts (music, dance, drama, etc.) to pursue their interests. In addition to the Arcata Arts Institute, Arcata High School has a Concert Choir, Madrigal Choir, Jazz Band, and the ArMack Orchestra.

== Athletics ==
Arcata High School is part of the Humboldt-Del Norte League of the CIF North Coast Section (NCS). As of 2022 the campus has completed its updated athletic facilities featuring a Football Field, Track, and Baseball Field. It was built in the area formerly known as the "lower field" and later named the "James Washington Track and Field" after a school coach.

== Notable alumni ==
- Medal of Honor recipient James Allen Taylor graduated in 1954 or 1955
- Christa Johnson, LPGA professional golfer.
- Geoffrey Owens, an actor best known as Elvin Tibideaux in The Cosby show
- Dane Iorg, former professional baseball player (Saint Louis Cardinals, Philadelphia Phillies, Kansas City Royals, San Diego Padres)
- Garth Iorg, former professional baseball player (Toronto Blue Jays)
- Gary Wilson, former professional baseball player (Pittsburgh Pirates)
- Chris Butterfield, former Arena Football League player
