= Thomas E. Leavey =

American businessman and philanthropist

Thomas Leavey
- Born: 1897; Ferndale, Humboldt County, California
- Died: March 29, 1980 (aged 82–83); Los Angeles County, California
- Education: Santa Clara University; Georgetown University School of Law
- Occupations: Business executive, philanthropist
- Spouse: Dorothy Leavey (m. 1930)
- Children: 2

Thomas E. Leavey (1897–1980) was an American business executive, rancher, and philanthropist.

== Early life ==
Leavey was born in 1897 near Ferndale in Humboldt County, California to Irish immigrants. After graduating from Ferndale High School, he attended Santa Clara University and served briefly in the U. S. Army during the final months of World War I. In 1923, he received a bachelor's degree from the Georgetown University School of Law and relocated to Los Angeles, California two years later.

== Career ==
In 1928, he co-founded the company that became the Farmers Insurance Group with John C. Tyler. With his wife, Dorothy Leavey, he established the Thomas and Dorothy Leavey Foundation in 1952. The Leavey Foundation prefers to donate privately; however, it has publicly donated more than $200 million to support educational, religious, and other institutions.

== Personal life ==
Leavey married his wife Dorothy Leavey in 1930. They had two daughters, Kathleen McCarthy Kostlan and Dorothy Therese Leavey.

He died on March 29, 1980, at the age of 82. His wife, Dorothy Leavey, died in January 1998 at the age of 101.
