= Farmers Insurance Group =

American insurance company

- Logo since 2013
- Type: Private
- Industry: Financial services
- Founded: 1928; 98 years ago Los Angeles, California, U.S.
- Founders: John C. Tyler; Thomas E. Leavey
- Headquarters: 6301 Owensmouth Avenue; Woodland Hills, Los Angeles, California, U.S.
- Area served: United States
- Key people: Raul Vargas (CEO)
- Services: Insurance, other financial services
- Revenue: ▼US$ 11.65 billion (2019)
- Net income: US$ -70.5 million (2019)
- Total assets: US$ 17.02 billion (2019)
- Total equity: US$ 4.1 billion (2019)
- Number of employees: 12,740 (2019)
- Parent: Zurich Insurance Group
- Divisions: Farmers Insurance; Foremost Insurance; Bristol West Insurance; 21st Century Insurance; Farmers Life
- Website: www.farmers.com

Farmers Insurance Group (also known as Farmers) is an American insurer providing coverage for vehicles, homes and small businesses including other insurance and financial services products. The group operates through more than 48,000 exclusive and independent agents and approximately 21,000 employees.

Farmers is the trade name for three reciprocal exchanges, Farmers Insurance Exchange, Fire Insurance Exchange, and Truck Insurance Exchange -- each managed by Farmers Group, Inc. as attorney-in-fact on behalf of their respective policyholders. Farmers Group, Inc. is a wholly owned subsidiary of Swiss-based Zurich Insurance Group.

== History ==
=== 1922 to 2000 ===
1922

Farmers' future co-founders John C. Tyler and Thomas E. Leavey first met after Tyler moved to California. Tyler and Leavey had both grown up with rural backgrounds and believed that farmers and ranchers, who had better driving records than urbanites, deserved lower insurance premiums. During the 1920s, farmers across the United States were establishing their own mutual insurance firms and cooperatives in order to have less expensive policies. Tyler, the son of a South Dakotan insurance salesman, and Leavey, who had formerly worked for the Federal Farm Loan Bureau and the National Farm Loan Association, recognized that these farmers, ranchers, and other rural drivers were an overlooked market and wished to create their own auto insurance firm.

1927

Tyler and Leavey received a loan from the founder of Bank of America, enabling them to start their company.

1928

Tyler and Leavey opened the doors to their newly founded company, Farmers Automobile Inter-Insurance Exchange, in downtown Los Angeles, California. Tyler served as president with Leavey as vice president. A sales manager and secretary completed the four-employee team.

On March 28, 1928, the first meeting of the board of governors was convened. Two days later, Charles Brisco insured his 1925 Cadillac Phaeton and became the first Farmers customer.

1935

Truck Insurance Exchange, a new reciprocal insurer, was launched to specialize in truck insurance.

1936

Farmers Insurance Exchange was named the leading reciprocal in earned premiums for auto insurance by National Underwriter.

1937

New headquarters building to house the Farmers Automobile Inter-Insurance Exchange and Truck Insurance Exchange, designed by Walker & Eisen in the Moderne style, opens on Wilshire Boulevard. Architects Claud Beelman & Herman Spackler add 4 floors and a seventh-floor garden terrace for staff in 1949.

1942

Fire Insurance Exchange, the third reciprocal insurer, was launched, specializing in home insurance.

1950

Mid-Century Insurance Company became a subsidiary of the Farmers Insurance Exchange. Aside from the insurance coverage provided by the original three exchanges, Mid-Century offered insurance coverage for Inland marine, robbery, burglary, personal lines, plate glass, selected bonds, and floaters.

1953

Seattle-based New World Life Insurance Company was acquired by Farmers.

1959

Farmers began annual participation in the Pasadena Rose Parade, launching its involvement in parades and community events nationwide.

1973

John C. Tyler died at the age of 86. Thomas E. Leavey, the remaining co-founder, took the CEO position.

1978

Thomas E. Leavey retired.

1988

After an eight-month takeover battle, BATUS Inc., the American subsidiary of British conglomerate B.A.T. Industries Plc, acquired Farmers Group, Inc. for $5.2 billion and became the sole stockholder of the company's 68 million shares of common stock.

1989, 1991, and 1994

Multiple, large-scale disasters posed financial challenges to Farmers Insurance. The 1989 San Francisco earthquake, 1991 Oakland fire, and 1994 Northridge, California, earthquake were the three most significant disasters. It was estimated that the losses from the Northridge earthquake alone were $1.3 billion.

1998

In September 1998, the Zurich Financial Services Group was created from the merger with the financial services business of B.A.T. Industries for $18.6 Billion through a dual holding structure.

=== 2000 to present ===
2000

In March 2000, the Farmers Exchanges acquired Foremost Corporation of America (Foremost Insurance Group), a leading writer of manufactured homes and a prominent insurer of recreational vehicles, boats and other specialty lines.

In August 2000, Farmers Financial Solutions registered with the U.S. Securities and Exchange Commission as a broker-dealer. Through it, Farmers began offering mutual fund and variable insurance products.

In October 2000, the Zurich structure was simplified and unified under a single Swiss holding company. Allied Zurich and Zurich Allied shares were replaced by shares of the newly incorporated Zurich Financial Services with a primary listing on SWX Swiss Exchange (ticker symbol: ZURN) and a secondary listing in London. Zurich Financial Services American Depositary Receipts (ADRs) are traded on the American Stock Exchange.

2005

In 2005, after Hurricane Rita hit Beaumont, Texas, leaving it without power, Farmers Insurance brought in almost 300 insurance adjusters to assess exterior property damage in order to expedite the reconstruction effort, provided $100,000 for the emergency operations center, and two badly needed megawatt electric generators.

2007

In July 2007, the Farmers Exchanges acquired Bristol West Holdings, Inc., the parent of a group of insurers specializing in non-standard auto insurance, which provides insurance coverage for drivers whose driving records or other problems make obtaining insurance difficult.

During the October 2007 California wildfires, Farmers was one of only a few companies to set up facilities to aid their customers. In addition to writing checks for evacuation costs, damage claims, lodging and meals, the company ran commercials urging their customers to take advantage of these facilities. The company now also has 2 buses serving as Mobile Command Centers. This mobile claim center arrived at Qualcomm Stadium only two days after the fires started.

2009

In April 2009, Farmers announced that it would acquire 21st Century Insurance from AIG for $1.9 billion. The acquisition made Farmers the joint third-largest personal lines insurer in the U.S. The acquired assets included AIG Hawaii.

2014

In response to the increasing number of deadly storms between 2010 and 2013, Farmers Insurance began "researching a model that municipalities across the United States could use to significantly reduce the time required for residential recovery." Teaming with SBP, a disaster relief organization based out of New Orleans, the result was the Disaster Recovery Playbook, an evolving online resource. Since the guide's initial creation, AmeriCorps has been brought onto the team.

2020

In December 2020, Farmers Exchanges and Farmers Group, Inc. (FGI) announced they will jointly acquire MetLife's property and casualty business (MetLife Auto & Home).

== Operations ==
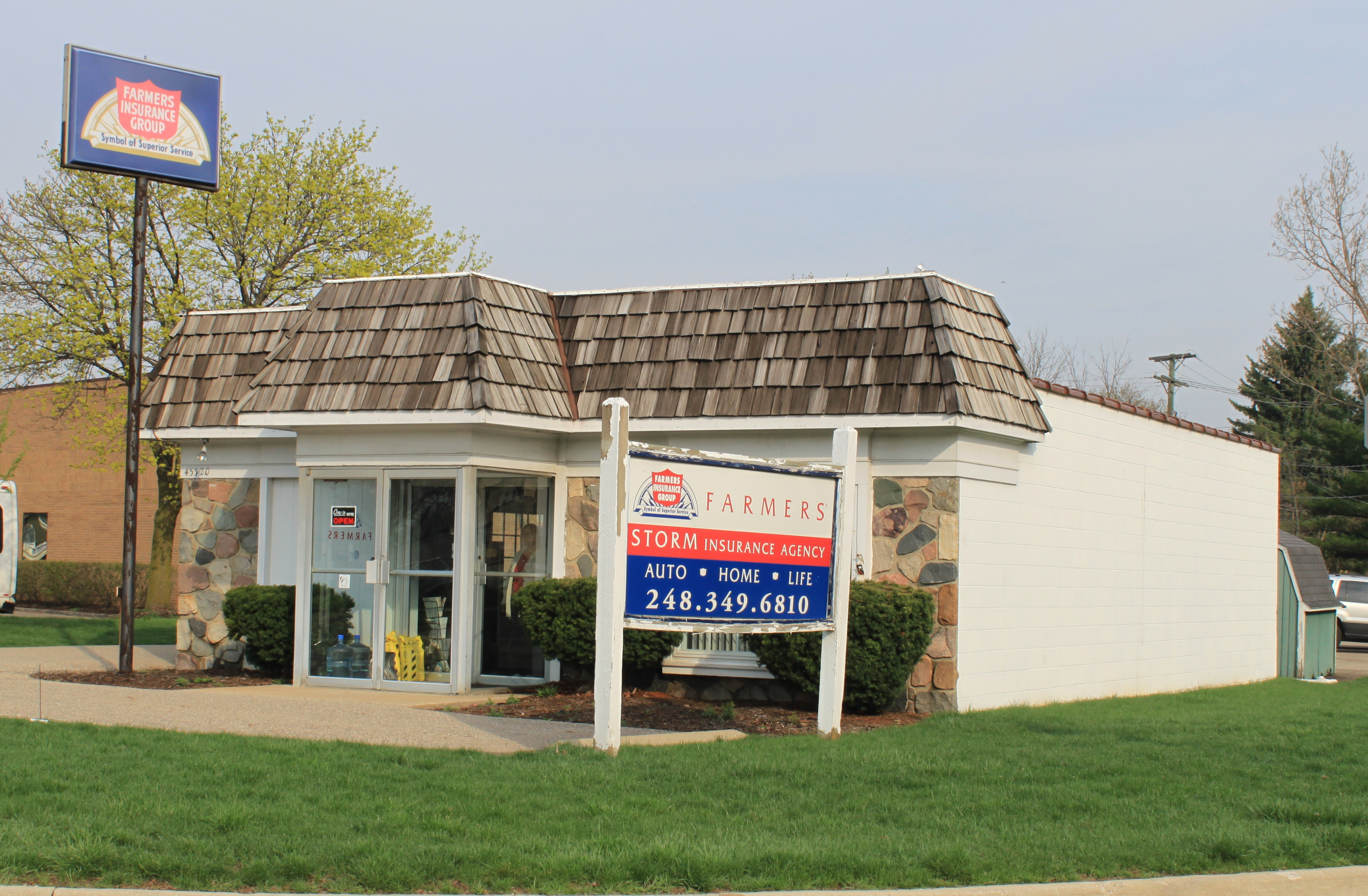
A Farmers Agency in Northville, Michigan

- The Farmers Exchanges, headquartered in Los Angeles, CA, are three reciprocal inter-insurance exchanges (Farmers Insurance Exchange, Fire Insurance Exchange and Truck Insurance Exchange) in which members exchange insurance policies with each other via Farmers Group, Inc. (FGI) as attorney-in-fact. The Farmers Exchanges, directly or through their subsidiaries and affiliates, offer homeowners insurance, auto insurance, commercial insurance, and financial services throughout the United States. FGI provides operating services to the exchanges, for which it is compensated via fees from policyholders, calculated as a percentage of premium. Claims adjustment services and the payment of claims, commissions, and premium and income taxes are provided to the exchanges by FGI pursuant to subscription agreements between FGI and each of the exchange's individual policyholders. Reciprocal exchanges are unincorporated associations that lack legal personality, and thus reciprocals have no owners (unlike mutual insurers which are owned by policyholders). Therefore, The Farmers Exchanges do not own FGI, and neither FGI nor its ultimate parent, Zurich Financial Services Ltd., own the exchanges.
- The Foremost Insurance Group, headquartered in Grand Rapids, Michigan, is a group of companies that primarily insure specialty products such as mobile homes, motor homes, travel trailers and specialty dwellings, motorcycles, off-road vehicles, boats and personal watercraft. It was founded in 1952 and was acquired by the Farmers Exchanges in March 2000. The Foremost companies are subsidiaries of the Farmers Exchanges.
- The Bristol West Insurance Group became a part of Farmers in July 2007. In 1973, it began providing private passenger auto insurance to residents in Florida and now provides liability and physical damage insurance – focusing exclusively on private passenger vehicles – across the United States. The Bristol West companies are subsidiaries of the Farmers Exchanges.
- 21st Century Insurance, headquartered in Wilmington, Delaware, became a part of Farmers in July 2009. Using the internet and direct response marketing channels, 21st Century markets personal auto insurance to consumers throughout the United States. The 21st Century Insurance companies are subsidiaries of the Farmers Exchanges.
- Farmers New World Life Insurance Company started as Catholic Life Insurance Company in Spokane, Washington in 1910. Later that year it was renamed New World Life Insurance Company. In 1953, it was acquired by Farmers Group, Inc. In 1954, its name was changed to the current Farmers New World Life Insurance Company. Farmers New World Life Insurance Company is now based in the Seattle suburb of Bellevue, Washington. It offers flexible universal life insurance, traditional term life insurance, whole life insurance and annuities. Farmers New World Life Insurance Company is a subsidiary of Farmers Group, Inc.
- Farmers Financial Solutions, LLC. was created by the Farmers Exchanges in 2000 to provide financial products to customers.

== Products and services ==
Farmers' products and services include:

- auto insurance;
- home insurance, including homeowners, condominium and renters insurance, mobile and manufactured home insurance, specialty home insurance, including landlord and rental properties, seasonal homes, and vacation homes, and flood insurance through the National Flood Insurance Program;
- motorcycle insurance;
- life insurance, including term, whole and universal life insurance;
- recreational insurance, such as insurance for boats, ATVs, RVs, and travel trailers;
- business insurance for small and medium-sized businesses, such as liability and property insurance, commercial auto and workers compensation insurance for apartment and commercial property owners, artisan contractors, condominium homeowner associations, retail stores, service providers, offices, religious organizations, educational and non-profit organizations, hotels, motels, bed & breakfasts, and other businesses in the light manufacturing, restaurant, wholesale, and auto service & repair industries; and
- financial services and products, such as mutual funds and variable annuities.

== Sponsorships ==
=== Farmers Field ===
In February 2011, Farmers announced that it had agreed to sponsor a football stadium in the city of Los Angeles. This stadium would have been located downtown, close to the Staples Center. The contract was signed for 30 years, and its estimated cost was $700 million. The deal would have started with $20 million for the first year, then eventual increases. The stadium was planned to be named "Farmers Field". The stadium project was cancelled after the Kroenke Sports & Entertainment announced their own stadium to be built to be the home of the Los Angeles Rams and Los Angeles Chargers.

=== The Farmers Insurance Open ===
Farmers became the title sponsor of the Farmers Insurance Open PGA tournament in Torrey Pines, CA in 2010. The event raises millions for local San Diego charities each year. www.farmersinsuranceopen.com

=== NASCAR ===
Farmers was the sponsor of the No. 5 Chevrolet SS driven by Kasey Kahne for Hendrick Motorsports in the Monster Energy NASCAR Cup Series from the 2012 season till the end of the 2017 season. The year prior, Farmers sponsored Mark Martin and a few years before that, Travis Kvapil. Farmers was the first to introduce a #hashtag on a race car. Kahne's first victory in the No. 5 was at the 2012 Coca-Cola 600 at Charlotte Motor Speedway. Farmers promotes its motor-sport relationship through the Farmers Racing website. At the conclusion of the 2017 season, Farmers Insurance left Hendrick motor-sports and NASCAR. The combination produced 6 wins in 6 years together including a Brickyard 400.

== Advertising ==
Farmers Insurance Group's television advertisements typically center around "Farmers University," an institution in which professor Nathaniel Burke (J. K. Simmons) educates Farmers employees about various unlikely insurance claims (often involving devious animals) the company covers.

== Criticism ==
=== Complaints to state insurance departments ===
In 2006, Farmers Insurance received the highest number of complaints to state insurance departments in Washington and Oregon.

=== Lawsuits ===
- In 1999, American businesswoman Melinda Ballard sued Farmers over toxic black mold damage in her 22-room family home in Dripping Springs, Texas. Her three-year-old son, Reese Allison developed an unexplained respiratory condition in March 1999. Her husband, Ron Allison was later shown to have signs of Alzheimer's disease. On April 1, 1999, after the start of Ron and Reese's symptoms, Melinda took a Southwest Airlines flight and became ill, coughing up blood. Air-quality expert and investigator Bill Holder, who happened to be sitting in the adjacent seat, asked if there was a leak in their home which she confirmed. He speculated that her ill health could be due to a toxic form of black mold in their 12,000 square foot home, which was based on the movie version of "Tara", the home of Scarlett O'Hara in Gone With the Wind. Their case started as a single claim for water damage and turned into a case about mold contamination in the entire house. They were one of the first cases to highlight the dangerous results of toxic mold and increased public awareness of the dangers of mold. She and her husband, Ron Allison, were awarded $32 million in 2001 as a result of a lawsuit against Farmers Insurance for their failure to pay claims relating to mold damage. The award was later reduced to $4 million on appeal however a subsequent settlement awarded a larger, confidential sum to the family. As a result of her case and the attention she received, Ballard founded Policyholders of America, a consumer advocacy group and homeowner's insurance information clearinghouse in around 2004. Melinda died in 2013 at the age of 55, Ron died in 2021 at the age of 51, and Reece died in 2021 at the age of 25.
- In 2005, the company refused to pay a claim on a car accident because the accident was allegedly caused intentionally by another driver. Despite Farmers' claims, the state of Washington ordered the company to pay the claim.
- In Betty Jo Walker v. Farmers Insurance (2007), Farmers was fined $3 million for not defending a pair of limited-income homeowners from a negligence claim.
- In Goddard v. Farmers Insurance (2008), Farmers was ordered to pay $2.5 million for handling a claim with bad faith and "stonewalling" during settlement negotiations. The original punitive damages award was $20 million.
- In Moeller v. Farmers Ins. Co. of Washington (2013), the company was alleged to have failed to comply with state law by not paying "diminished value," which is the loss in value suffered by certain insured vehicles even after they are repaired. The class-action lawsuit was resolved in exchange for payments from the company not exceeding $48.5 million. The company denied any liability.
- In 2015, Farmers was hit with a putative class action by current and former employees who say they have been shorted on overtime wages and breaks. The suit was filed under California's Private Attorney General Act by four senior commercial claims representatives who claim that Farmers improperly classified them as exempt from overtime pay when they were often required greater than the standard 8 hours a day and thus sometimes more than 40 hours per week.
- Also in 2015, a number of female attorneys employed as Farmers' in-house legal counsel filed a class action claiming that they had been discriminated against by being paid wages less than male attorneys in comparable positions and by being passed over for promotional opportunities. The class action was settled in June 2016 by an agreement which provides $4 million for the class members and also a commitment by Farmers to a number of employment policy changes going forward. These will include an increase in the number of women attorneys in its higher salary grades and a three-year period during which a company official will monitor compliance with the agreement, provide diversity training to its in-house attorneys and provide regular progress reports to the attorneys who represented the plaintiff in the class action.

== Financial ratings ==
- A.M. Best Company 2025: A (Excellent)
- Moody's Investor Service 2008: A2 (Good)
- Standard and Poor's 2008: A (Stable)

== Customer service record ==
- The 2006 American Customer Satisfaction Index conducted by the University of Michigan found that customer satisfaction with Farmers was at exactly the same level as the overall Property and Casualty Industry. In addition, Farmers' satisfaction level was the most improved from 2005 to 2006 among the companies surveyed.
- In March 2006, Consumer Reports considered Farmers Insurance one of the "poorest performers" among 27 insurance companies in terms of paying off (auto) claims in 30 days or less.
- In the JD Powers 2007 Collision Repair Satisfaction Study, which covered customers surveyed between 2001 and 2004, Farmers Insurance received the lowest possible ratings in all four of the studied categories: "Overall Experience," "Claim Settlement," "Claim Representative" and "Claim Process and Procedures." Of the 26 companies surveyed, Farmers was tied for 20th place.
- In 2005, 2006, and 2007 Farmers Insurance Group won the J.D. Power award for Call Center Customer Service Excellence.
- In 2008 Bristol West had a complaint ratio of 3.42 while the national median was 1.0 according to the NAIC.
- In 2006, Farmers Insurance received the highest number of complaints to state insurance departments in Washington and Oregon.

== See also ==
List of United States Insurance Companies
