= List of professional designations in the United States =

Many professional designations in the United States take the form of post-nominal letters. Professional societies or educational institutes usually award certifications. Obtaining a certificate is voluntary in some fields, but in others, certification from a government-accredited agency may be legally required to perform specific jobs or tasks.

Organizations in the United States involved in setting standards for certification include the American National Standards Institute (ANSI) and the Institute for Credentialing Excellence (ICE). Many certification organizations are members of the Association of Test Publishers (ATP).

== Accounting and finance ==
Name	Post-nominal	Agency
Certificate in Investment Performance Measurement	CIPM	CFA Institute
Chartered Financial Analyst	CFA	CFA Institute
Certified Futures and Options Analyst	CFOA	International Council for Derivative Trading
Chartered Financial Intelligence Architect	CFIA	International Council for Derivative Trading
Chartered Business Valuator	CBV	CBV Institute
Chartered Market Technician	CMT	Market Technicians Association
Chartered Alternative Investment Analyst	CAIA	Chartered Alternative Investment Analyst Association
Chartered Management Consultant	ChMC	Chartered Institute of Management Consultants
Chartered Global Management Accountant	CGMA	American Institute of CPAs and Chartered Institute of Management Accountants
Certified Accounts Payable Specialist	CAPS	The Institute of Financial Operations Leadership
Certified Accounts Payable Practitioner	CAPP	The Institute of Financial Operations Leadership
Certified Public Accountant	CPA	American Institute of CPAs and Chartered Institute of Management Accountants
Certified Financial Education Instructor	CFEI	National Financial Educators Council
Certified Internal Control Specialist	CICS	Internal Control Institute
Certified Internal Control Professional	CICP	Internal Control Institute
Certified Financial Planner	CFP	Certified Financial Planner Board of Standards
Certified Divorce Financial Analyst	CDFA	Institute for Divorce Financial Analysts
Certified Anti-Money Laundering Specialist	CAMS	Association of Certified Anti-Money Laundering Specialists
Certified Financial Consultant	CFC	Institute of Financial Consultants
Certified Credit Union Financial Counselor	CCUFC	Credit Union National Association
Chartered Life Underwriter	CLU	American College of Financial Services
Certified Fraud Examiner	CFE	Association of Certified Fraud Examiners
Certified Internal Auditor	CIA	Institute of Internal Auditors
Certification in Risk Management Assurance	CRMA	Institute of Internal Auditors
Certified Government Auditing Professional	CGAP	Institute of Internal Auditors
Certified Payroll Professional	CPP	American Payroll Association
Fundamental Payroll Certification	FPC	American Payroll Association
Certified California Municipal Treasurer	CCMT	California Municipal Treasurers Association
Certified Government Financial Manager	CGFM	Association of Government Accountants
Certified Government Finance Officer	CGFO	Government Finance Officers Association of Texas
Certified Management Accountant	CMA	Institute of Management Accountants
Certified MBA™	MBA+™	MBA Board of Standards
MBA Executive	MBAe™	MBA Board of Standards
Certified Municipal Finance Officer	CMFO	Tennessee Comptroller of the Treasury
Certified Public Finance Administrator	CPFA	Association of Public Treasurers of the United States and Canada
Certified Public Finance Officer	CPFO	Government Finance Officers Association
Chartered Property Casualty Underwriter	CPCU	American Institute For Chartered Property Casualty Underwriters
Certified Defense Financial Manager	CDFM	Society of Defense Financial Management
Communication Management Professional	CMP	Global Communication Certification Council
Registered Tax Return Preparer	RTRP	Internal Revenue Service
Enrolled Agent	EA	Internal Revenue Service
Fraternal Insurance Counselor Fellow	FICF	National Association of Fraternal Insurance Counselors
Fraternal Insurance Counselor	FIC	National Association of Fraternal Insurance Counselors
Certified Corporate FP&A Professional	FP&A	Association for Financial Professionals
ISSP Sustainability		Association for Financial Professionals
Certified Treasury Professional	CTP	Association for Financial Professionals
Certified Trust and Financial Advisor	CTFA	American Bankers Association
Certified Turnaround Professional	CTP	Turnaround Management Association
Registered Financial Planner	RFP	Registered Financial Planners Institute
Financial Risk Manager	FRM	Global Association of Risk Professionals
Professional Risk Manager	PRM	Professional Risk Managers' International Association
Strategic Communication Management Professional	SCMP	Global Communication Certification Council
Licensed Public Accountant	LPA	State Board of Accountancy
Accredited Business Accountant/Advisor	ABA	Accreditation Council for Accountancy and Taxation
Investment Adviser Certified Compliance Professional	IACCP	Investment Adviser Association and National Regulatory Services

== Actuarial ==
Name	Post-nominal	Agency
Associate of the Society of Actuaries	ASA	Society of Actuaries
Fellow of the Society of Actuaries	FSA	Society of Actuaries
Chartered Enterprise Risk Analyst	CERA	Society of Actuaries
Associate of the Casualty Actuarial Society	ACAS	Casualty Actuarial Society
Fellow of the Casualty Actuarial Society	FCAS	Casualty Actuarial Society
Member of the American Academy of Actuaries	MAAA	American Academy of Actuaries
Associate of the Conference of Consulting Actuaries	ACA	Conference of Consulting Actuaries
Fellow of the Conference of Consulting Actuaries	FCA	Conference of Consulting Actuaries
Enrolled Actuary	EAc	Joint Board for the Enrollment of Actuaries

== Architecture, interior design, landscape architecture, and planning ==
Name	Post-nominal	Agency
Registered Architect	RA	state licensing board
Professional Landscape Architect	PLA	state licensing board
Professional Planner	PP	state licensing board (NJ)
Registered Interior Designer	RID	state licensing board
National Council of Architectural Registration Boards Certified	NCARB	National Council of Architectural Registration Boards
National Council for Interior Design Qualification Certified	NCIDQ	National Council for Interior Design Qualification
Association of Licensed Architects Member	ALA	Association of Licensed Architects
Association of Licensed Architects Fellow	FALA	Association of Licensed Architects
American College of Healthcare Architects	ACHA	American College of Healthcare Architects
American College of Healthcare Architects Fellow	FACHA	American College of Healthcare Architects
American Institute of Architects Member	AIA	American Institute of Architects
American Institute of Architects Fellow	FAIA	American Institute of Architects
American Society of Interior Designers Member	ASID	American Society of Interior Designers
American Society of Interior Designers Fellow	FASID	American Society of Interior Designers
Council of Educators in Landscape Architecture Member	CELA	Council of Educators in Landscape Architecture
Council of Educators in Landscape Architecture Fellow	FCELA	Council of Educators in Landscape Architecture
American Society of Landscape Architects Member	ASLA	American Society of Landscape Architects
American Society of Landscape Architects Fellow	FASLA	American Society of Landscape Architects
American Institute of Certified Planners Member	AICP	American Institute of Certified Planners
American Institute of Certified Planners Fellow	FAICP	American Institute of Certified Planners
Leadership in Energy and Environmental Design Accredited Professional	LEED AP	U.S. Green Building Council
Leadership in Energy and Environmental Design Green Associate	LEED GA	U.S. Green Building Council
Construction Specification Institute Member	CSI	Construction Specifications Institute
Construction Document Technologist	CDT	Construction Specifications Institute
Certified Construction Contract Administrator	CCCA	Construction Specifications Institute
Certified Construction Specifier	CCS	Construction Specifications Institute
Certified Construction Product Representative	CCPR	Construction Specifications Institute

== Association, credentialing, and not-for-profit management ==
Name	Post-nominal
Certified Association Executive	CAE
Advanced Certification Administrator	ACA
Basic Certification Administrator	BCA
Certified Fundraising Executive	CFRE
Advanced Certified Nonprofit Professional	ACNP
Certified Nonprofit Professional	CNP

== Broadcast engineering ==
Name	Post-nominal
Certified Radio Operator	CRO
Certified Television Operator	CTO
Certified Broadcast Networking Technologist	CBNT
Certified Broadcast Technologist	CBT
Certified Audio Engineer	CEA
Certified Broadcast Television Engineer	CBTE
Certified Broadcast Networking Engineer	CBNE
Certified Senior Broadcast Radio Engineer	CSRE
Certified Senior Broadcast Television Engineer	CSTE
Certified Professional Broadcast Engineer	CPBE
Certified 8-VSB Specialist	8-VSB
Certified AM Directional Specialist	AMD
Certified Digital Radio Broadcast Specialist	DRB
Certified Senior Broadcast Engineer	CSBE
Certified Radio and Television Broadcast Engineer	CBRTE
Certified Senior Radio and Television Broadcast Engineer	CSRTE

== Communications ==
Name	Post-nominal	Agency
Accredited Business Communicator	ABC	International Association of Business Communicators
Accreditation in Public Relations	APR	Public Relations Society of America
Accreditation in Public Relations and Military Communication	APR+M	Public Relations Society of America
Certified Cooperative Communicator	CCC	National Rural Electric Cooperative Association
Certified Speaking Professional	CSP	National Speakers Association
Communication Management Professional	CMP	Global Communication Certification Council
Strategic Communication Management Professional	SCMP	Global Communication Certification Council

== Contract management ==
Name	Post-nominal	Agency	Levels
Certified Commercial Contract Manager	CCCM	National Contract Management Association	N/A
Contract and Commercial Management Certification	CCM	International Association for Contract and Commercial Management	Associate, Practitioner, and Expert
Certified Federal Contract Manager	CFCM	National Contract Management Association	N/A
Certified Professional Contract Manager	CPCM	National Contract Management Association	N/A
Defense Acquisition Workforce Improvement Act Contracting Certification	DAWIA Contracting Certification	Defense Acquisition University	I, II, and III
Federal Acquisition Certification in Contracting	FAC-C	Federal Acquisition Institute	I, II, and III
Industry Certification in Contract Management - Defense	ICCM-D	National Contract Management Association	I, II, and III
Industry Certification in Contract Management - Federal	ICCM-F	National Contract Management Association	I, II, and III

== Economics ==
Name	Post-nominal
Member of the International Association for Energy Economics	IAEE
Member of the Global Association of Economics Education	GAEE

== Emergency management and public safety ==
Name	Post-nominal	Agency
Certified Emergency Manager^{®}	CEM^{®}	International Association of Emergency Managers
Associate Emergency Manager^{®}	AEM^{®}	International Association of Emergency Managers
Certified Floodplain Manager	CFM	Association of State Floodplain Managers
Chief Fire Officer	CFO	Center for Public Safety Excellence (CPSE)
Fellow of the Academy of Emergency Management	FAcEM	Emergency Management Academy
Executive Fire Officer	EFO	U.S. Fire Administration
Emergency Number Professional	ENP	National Emergency Number Association
Center Manager Certification Program	CMCP	National Emergency Number Association
Excellence in Dispatch Certificate	EID	National Emergency Number Association
Communications Center Manager Certification	CCM	APCO International - Leaders in Public Safety Communications
Registered Public-Safety Leader Program	RPL	APCO International - Leaders in Public Safety Communications
Certified Public-Safety Executive Program	CPE	APCO International - Leaders in Public Safety Communications
Master Exercise Practitioner	MEP	Federal Emergency Management Agency, Master
Certified Fire Executive	CFE	Texas Fire Chiefs Association
National Crime Prevention Specialist	NCPS	National Crime Prevention Association
Fire Marshal	FM	Center for Public Safety Excellence (CPSE)
Chief EMS Officer	CEMSO	Center for Public Safety Excellence (CPSE)
Chief Training Officer	CTO	Center for Public Safety Excellence (CPSE)
Fire Officer	FO	Center for Public Safety Excellence (CPSE)
Certified Homeland Protection Professional	CHPP	National Sheriffs' Association
Certified Forensic Manager I	CFM-I	National Forensic Science Academy
Certified Forensic Manager II	CFM-II	National Forensic Science Academy
Certified Forensic Manager III	CFM-III	National Forensic Science Academy

== Engineering ==
Name	Post-nominal	Notes
Certified Energy Manager	CEM	Certified by Association of Energy Engineers (AEE)
Professional Engineer	PE	Licensure by individual state boards, examination by National Council of Examiners for Engineering and Surveying
Certified Sales Engineer	CSE	Certified by the North American Association of Sales Engineers (NAASE)
Master of Engineering Management	MEM	Professional engineering business degree comparable to an MBA.
Model Law Engineer	MLE	Designation bestowed by the National Council of Examiners for Engineering and Surveying
Model Law Structural Engineer	MLSE	Designation bestowed by the National Council of Examiners for Engineering and Surveying
Structural Engineer	SE	Licensure by individual state boards, examination by National Council of Examiners for Engineering and Surveying
Structural Engineering Certification Board	SECB	Designation bestowed by Structural Engineering Certification Board
Engineer Intern	EI	Designation bestowed by individual state boards, examination (FE) by National Council of Examiners for Engineering and Surveying
Engineer-in-Training	EIT	Designation bestowed by individual state boards, examination (FE) by National Council of Examiners for Engineering and Surveying
National Institute For Certification In Engineering Technologies	NICET I/II/III/IV	Also, TT, AET, ET, SET, or simply CET (technicians) – CT, CET (technologists)
Certified Engineering Technician	CET	
Member of the National Academy of Engineering	MNAE	
Student Member of the Institute of Electrical and Electronics Engineers	StMIEEE	
Graduate Student Member of the Institute of Electrical and Electronics Engineers	GSMIEEE	
Associate Member of the Institute of Electrical and Electronics Engineers	AMIEEE	
Member of the Institute of Electrical and Electronics Engineers	MIEEE	
Senior Member of the Institute of Electrical and Electronics Engineers	SMIEEE	
Fellow of the Institute of Electrical and Electronics Engineers	FIEEE	
Member of the American Institute of Chemical Engineers	MAIChE	
Senior Member of the American Institute of Chemical Engineers	SMAIChE	
Fellow of the American Institute of Chemical Engineers	FAIChE	
Senior Member of the Institute of Industrial Engineers	SIIE	
Certified Drafter	CD	
Distinguished Member, American Society of Civil Engineers	Dist.M.ASCE	A person who has attained eminence in some branch of engineering or in the arts and sciences related thereto, including the fields of engineering education and construction.
Fellow, American Society of Civil Engineers	F.ASCE	A prestigious honor held by 3% of ASCE members.
Member, American Society of Civil Engineers	M.ASCE	
Associate, American Society of Civil Engineers	A.M.ASCE	
Affiliate, American Society of Civil Engineers	Aff.M.ASCE	
Student Member, American Society of Civil Engineers	S.M.ASCE	

== Fine and performing arts ==
Name	Post-nominal	Notes
Artist Diploma	AD	A non-degree program offered by various conservatories and schools of music for exceptional and experienced performers
Service Playing Certificate of the American Guild of Organists	SPC	Professional designation by the American Guild of Organists
Colleague of the American Guild of Organists	CAGO	Professional designation by the American Guild of Organists
Associate of the American Guild of Organists	AAGO	Professional designation by the American Guild of Organists
Choir Master of the American Guild of Organists	ChM	Professional designation by the American Guild of Organists
Fellow of the American Guild of Organists	FAGO	Professional designation by the American Guild of Organists
Certified Entertainment Electrician	ETCP-EE	Certification by the Entertainment Technician Certification Program
Certified Theatrical Rigger	ETCP-RT	Certification by the Entertainment Technician Certification Program
Certified Portable Power Distribution Technician	ETCP-PPD	Certification by the Entertainment Technician Certification Program
Certified Arena Rigger	ETCP-RA	Certification by the Entertainment Technician Certification Program
Fellow of the Hymn Society	FHS	Professional designation by the Hymn Society in the United States and Canada

== Genealogy ==
Name	Post-nominal	Notes
Accredited Genealogist	AG	Accreditation by the International Commission for the Accreditation of Professional Genealogists (ICAPGen)
Certified Genealogist	CG	Certification by the Board for Certification of Genealogists (BCG)
Certified Genetic Genealogist	CGG	Certification by the BCG
Certified Genealogical Lecturer	CGL	Certification by the BCG
Qualified Genealogist	QG	Qualification by the Register of Qualified Genealogists

== Geology, soil science, and other earth sciences ==
Name	Post-nominal	Notes
Professional Geologist	PG	Licensure by individual state boards, examination by National Association of State Boards of Geology
Geologist-in-Training	GIT	Licensure by individual state boards, examination by National Association of State Boards of Geology
Certified Professional Geologist	CPG	American Institute of Professional Geologists
Professional Hydrologist	PH	Designation bestowed by the Society for Certification of Hydrology Professionals
Associate Professional Soil Scientist	APSS	Designation bestowed by the Soil Science Society of America Soils Certifying Board, examination by the Soil Science Society of America Council of Soil Science Examiners
Certified Professional Soil Classifier	CPSC	Designation formerly bestowed by the Soil Science Society of America Soils Certifying Board, examination by the Soil Science Society of America Council of Soil Science Examiners
Certified Professional Soil Scientist	CPSS	Designation bestowed by the Soil Science Society of America Soils Certifying Board, examination by the Soil Science Society of America Council of Soil Science Examiners
Licensed Professional Soil Scientist, or similar	LPSS	Lincensure by individual state boards, examination by the Soil Science Society of America Council of Soil Science Examiners

== Geospatial and surveying ==
Name	Post-nominal	Agency
Certified Photogrammetrist	CP	American Society for Photogrammetry and Remote Sensing (ASPRS)
Geographic Information Systems Professional	GISP	GIS Certification Institute (GISCI)
Professional Land Surveyor	PLS	Licensure by individual state boards, examination by National Council of Examiners for Engineering and Surveying
Surveying Intern	SI	Designation bestowed by individual state boards, examination (FS) by National Council of Examiners for Engineering and Surveying
Model Law Surveyor	MLS	Designation bestowed by National Council of Examiners for Engineering and Surveying
Professional Surveyor & Mapper	PSM	
Registered Land Surveyor	RLS	
Land Surveyor Intern	LSI	
Land Surveyor-in-Training	LSIT	
Certified Federal Surveyor	CFedS	

== Government ==
Name	Post-nominal
Certified Environmental Authority Supervisor	CEAS
Credentialed Manager	ICMA-CM
Certified Government Chief Information Officer	CGCIO
Certified Municipal Clerk	CMC
Certified Municipal Finance Officer	CMFO
Certified Municipal Official (MO)	CMO
Certified Public Manager	CPM
Certified Public Works Manager (NJ)	CPWM
Certified Tax Assessor (NJ)	CTA
Certified Tax Collector (NJ)	CTC
Professional County Collector	PCC
Qualified Purchasing Agent (NJ)	QPA
Registered Municipal Accountant	RMA
Registered Municipal Clerk (NJ)	RMC
Registered Public Purchasing Official (NJ)	RPPO
Registered Public Purchasing Specialist (NJ)	RPPS

== Hospitality, tourism and recreation ==
Name	Post-nominal	Agency
Aquatic Facility Operator	AFO	National Recreation & Park Association
Designated Aquatics Professional	AqP	Association of Aquatic Professionals
Certified Meeting Professional	CMP	Convention Industry Council
Certified in Exhibition Management	CEM	International Association of Exhibitions and Events
Certified Hospitality Digital Marketer	CHDM	Hospitality Sales and Marketing International
Certified Revenue Management Executive	CRME	Hospitality Sales and Marketing International
Certified in Hospitality Business Acumen	CHBA	Hospitality Sales and Marketing International
Certified in Hospitality Sales Competences	CHSC	Hospitality Sales and Marketing International
Certified Hospitality Sales Executive	CHSE	Hospitality Sales and Marketing International
Certified Ganjier	CG	The Ganjier Cannabis Sommelier Certification Program
Certified Guest Service Professional	CGSP	American Hotel & Lodging Association Educational Institute
Certified Hospitality Administrator	CHA	American Hotel & Lodging Association Educational Institute
Certified Hospitality Educator	CHE	American Hotel & Lodging Association Educational Institute
Certified Hospitality Instructor	CHI	American Hotel & Lodging Association Educational Institute
Certified Room Division Executive	CRDE	American Hotel & Lodging Association Educational Institute
Certified Hospitality Revenue Manager	CHRM	American Hotel & Lodging Association Educational Institute
Certified Lodging Security Director	CLSD	American Hotel & Lodging Association Educational Institute
Certified Interpretive Guide	CIG	National Association for Interpretation
Certified Park & Recreation Professional	CPRP	National Recreation & Park Association
Certified Park & Recreation Executive	CPRE	National Recreation & Park Association
Certified Playground Safety Inspector	CPSI	National Recreation & Park Association
Certified Special Events Professional	CSEP	International Live Events Association
Certified Specialist of Spirits	CSS	Society of Wine Educators
Certified Specialist of Wine	CSW	Society of Wine Educators
Certified Spirits Educator	CSE	Society of Wine Educators
Certified Youth Sports Administrator	CYSA	National Association of Youth Sports
Certified Wedding and Event Planner	CWEP	The Wedding Planning Institute, a division of Lovegevity
Certified Wedding Planner	CWP	The Bridal Society
Certified Wine Educator	CWE	Society of Wine Educators
Digital Events Strategist	DES	Professional Convention Management Association
Master Sommelier	MS	Court of Master Sommeliers

== Human resources professions ==
Name	Post-nominal
SHRM Certified Professional	SHRM-CP
SHRM Senior Certified Professional	SHRM-SCP
IPMA-HR Certified Professional	IPMA-CP
IPMA-HR Senior Certified Professional	IPMA-SCP
Certified Benefits Professional	CBP
Certified Compensation Professional	CCP
Global Remuneration Professional	GRP
Associate Professional in Human Resources	aPHR
Professional in Human Resources	PHR
Professional in Human Resources – California	PHRca
Senior Professional in Human Resources	SPHR
Global Professional in Human Resources	GPHR
Certified Employee Benefits Specialist	CEBS
Group Benefits Associate	GBA
Compensation Management Specialist	CMS
Retirement Plans Associate	RPA
Certification in Volunteer Administration	CVA
Certified Conflict Manager	CCM

== Insurance industry ==
Name	Post-nominal
Accredited Claims Adjuster	ACA
Accredited Claims Professional	ACP
Accredited Claims Professional Candidate	ACAc
Associate in Claims	AIC
Applied Microbial Remediation Technician	AMRC
Casualty General Adjuster	CGA
Certified Claims Adjuster	CCA
Certified Claims Professional	CCP
Certified Claims Professional Candidate	CCPc
Chartered Property Casualty Underwriter	CPCU
Chartered Property Casualty Underwriter candidate	CPCUc
Certified Forensic Litigation Consultant	CFLC
Certified General Adjuster	CrtGA
Certified Mold Specialist	CMS
Certified Mold Inspector	CMI
Certified Property Appraiser and Umpire	CPAU
Certified Property Loss Appraiser	CPLA
Certified Property Loss Umpire	CPLU
Casualty General Adjuster	CGA
Certified General Adjuster	CrtGA
Casualty General Adjuster	CGA
Executive General Adjuster	EGA
Fire & Smoke Restoration Technician	FSRT
General Adjuster, Board Certified	GA-BC
GrandMaster General Adjuster	GMGA
HAAG Engineering Certified Roofing Inspector Residential/Commercial	HCI-R/C
Insurance Claims Expert / Insurance Claims Expert Prof./ Practitioner	ICE; ICEP
Litigation Specialist / Litigation Consultant	LS-LC
Legal Principles Claims Specialist	LPCS
Master General Adjuster	MGA
Master Public Adjuster	MPA
Property Claims Law Associate	PCLA
Property General Adjuster	PGA
Registered General Adjuster	RGA
Senior Professional Public Adjuster	SPPA
Universal Claims Certification	UCC
Windstorm Insurance Network Professional	WIND-P
Water Remediation Technician	WRT

== IT industry ==
Name	Post-nominal
Accredited Operations Specialist	AOS
Accredited Sustainability Advisor	ASA
Accredited Tier Designer	ATD
Accredited Tier Specialist	ATS
Accredited Operations Professional	AOP
Accredited Tier Professional	ATP
Certified Business Analysis Professional	CBAP
Certified Computer Examiner	CCE
Certified Data Center Audit Professional	CDCAP®
Certified Data Center Design Professional	CDCDP®
Certified Data Center Energy Professional	CDCEP®
Certified Data Center Management Professional	CDCMP®
Certified Data Center Project Management	CDCPM®
Certified Data Center Sustainability Professional	CDCSP®
Certified Data Center Technician Professional	CDCTP®
Certified Digital Marketing Professional	CDMP
Certified Chief Information Security Officer	CCISO
Certified Cloud Security Knowledge	CCSK
Certified Ethical Hacker	CEH
Certified Green IT Professional	IFGICT
Certified Forensic Computer Examiner	CFCE
CyberSec First Responder	CFR
Certified in the Governance of Enterprise IT	CGEIT
Certified in Cybersecurity	CC
Certified Information Professional	CIP
Certified Information Systems Auditor	CISA
Certified Information Security Manager	CISM
Certified Information Systems Security Professional	CISSP
Certified Network Professional	CNP
Certified in Risk and Information Systems Control	CRISC
Certified Scrum Master	CSM
Certified Scrum Professional	CSP
Certified Scrum Product Owner	CSPO
Certified Speaking Professional	CSP
Certified Secure Computer User	CSCU
Certified Secure Software Lifecycle Professional	CSSLP
Certified Software Tester	CSTE
Certified Technology Specialist	CTS
Certified Virtualization Professional	CVP
Certified Wireless Network Administrator	CWNA
Certified Wireless Analysis Professional	CWAP
Certified Wireless Design Professional	CWDP
Certified Wireless Security Professional	CWSP
Certified Wireless Network Expert	CWNE
Comptia Advanced Security Practitioner	CASP
Cisco Certified DevNet Associate	CCDevA
Cisco Certified DevNet Professional	CCDevP
Cisco Certified Network Associate	CCNA
Cisco Certified Network Professional	CCNP
Cisco Certified Internetworking Expert	CCIE
CyberSAFE	CBS
Cyber Secure Coder	CSC
Certified Usability Analyst	CUA
Certified User Experience Analyst	CXA
Google Associate Cloud Engineer	ACE
Lean IT Kaizen	LITK
Lean IT Leadership	LITL
Lean IT Professional	LITP
Master of Library and Information Science	MLIS
Master Mobile Application Developer	MMAD
Master of Mobile Application Security	MMAS
Microsoft Certified Database Administrator	MCDBA
Microsoft Certified Professional	MCP
Microsoft Certified Professional Developer	MCPD
Microsoft Certified Solutions Associate	MCSA
Microsoft Certified Solutions Developer	MCSD
Microsoft Certified Solutions Expert	MCSE
Microsoft Certified Systems Administrator	MCSA
Microsoft Certified Systems Engineer	MCSE
Microsoft Certified Trainer	MCT
Modern Certified Classroom Trainer	MCCT
Offensive Security Certified Professional	OSCP
Open-Source Certified	OSC
Oracle Certified Associate	OCA
Oracle Certified Professional	OCP
Oracle Certified Master	OCM
PMI Agile Certified Practitioner	PMI-ACP
Professional Scrum Master I	PSM I
Professional Scrum Master II	PSM II
Professional Scrum Master III	PSM II
Red Hat Certified Architect	RHCA
Registered Communication Distribution Designer	RCDD
SAFe Agilist	SA
SAFe Advanced Scrum Masters	SASM
Training from the BACK of the Room Certified Trainer	TBR-CT
User Experience Certification	UXC
User Experience Master Certification	UXMC
VMware Certified Professional	VCP
Zend Certified Engineer (PHP)	ZCE

== Law ==
Name	Post-nominal Abbreviation	Agency or Description
Juris Doctor	J.D.	An academic, not a professional designation. Identifies a person who has obtained the academic degree Juris Doctor or Doctor of Jurisprudence, which are different names for the same professional degree in law. Arizona discourages use of the initials by people who are not members of the Arizona Bar, in case that might mislead the general public into thinking the person is licensed; and other U.S. jurisdictions may do likewise. However, this may be unenforceable on First Amendment grounds and because the letters indicate an academic degree, not a professional qualification to practice law.
Doctor of Jurisprudence	D.Jur. or J.D.	An academic, not a professional designation. Identifies a person who has obtained the academic degree Doctor of Jurisprudence – functionally the same degree as Juris Doctor but conferred in English instead of Latin. Although conferred in English, the degree may be abbreviated in Latin (viz., compare Latin Ed.D. used for either Doctor of Education or Educationis Doctor; and M.D., used for both Medicinae Doctor and Doctor of Medicine, the latter which can also be abbreviated D.M.).
Doctor of Juridical Science	S.J.D.	An academic, not a professional designation. Identifies a person who has obtained the academic degree Scientiae Juridicae Doctor. It is academically the equivalent of a Ph.D. and is designed for aspiring legal academics who wish to pursue sustained independent study, research, and writing.
Master of Laws	LL.M.	An academic, not a professional designation. Identifies a person who has obtained the degree Legum Magister. Originally the second of three degrees in sequence – Legum Baccalaureus (LL.B., last conferred by an American law school in 1970); LL.M.; and Legum Doctor (LL.D.) or Doctor of Laws, which has only been conferred in the United States as an honorary degree but is an earned degree in other countries. In American legal academia, the LL.M. was historically conferred after the LL.B. When the LL.B. was replaced by the J.D., the LL.M. functionally metamorphosed from a post-baccalaureate degree into a post-doctoral degree.
Bachelor of Civil Law	BCL	An academic, not a professional designation. The BCL is a degree in professional law conferred by some Anglophone universities. It originated as a second baccalaureate degree at Oxford University, where it is still conferred as a law degree higher than the BA in law. However, it is also conferred by other institutions as a first baccalaureate degree.
Esquire	Esq.	Used by attorneys who have been admitted to the bar. Use by non-attorneys may be restricted by law (see unauthorized practice of law); however, these provisions may not be enforceable on First Amendment grounds, and because the abbreviation has never been limited to the legal profession. It is used by some fraternal organisations, including a branch of Freemasonry that uses it as a degree; and, perhaps more importantly, it can be used by and in address to commissioned officers in the United States foreign service. Otherwise, 'Esq.' has been historically used by non-attorneys who are the fourth or later generation with the same name as a forebear, e.g., Henry Smith I, Henry Smith II, Henry Smith III, thereafter Henry Smith, Esq. Traditional etiquette directs that courtesy titles like Esquire are not used with honorific or post-nominal abbreviations. But when Esquire or Esq. represent a professional qualification (legal or otherwise), the opposite rule applies; especially if there are multiple pre- and/or post-nomial abbreviations, e.g. Dr. Lt.Col. Henry J. Smith, Esq., J.D., M.D., Ph.D., USA (the last set of letters representing United States Army).
Justice of the Peace	J.P.	Denotes a level of judgeship
Notary Public	N.P.	Notaries in the USA are commissioned by the Secretary of State or equivalent officers of a state, commonwealth, territory, or the District of Columbia. The federal United States does not commission notaries public. Notarial responsibility varies from state to state, with California notaries required to use a seal that contains the Great Seal of California. In contrast, notaries from some other states are not required to have a seal.
Board Certified Civil Trial Attorney		National Board of Trial Advocacy
Board Certified Criminal Trial Attorney		National Board of Trial Advocacy
Board Certified Family Law Attorney		National Board of Trial Advocacy
Certified Legal Assistant	CLA	National Association of Legal Assistants; NALA, The Paralegal Association
Certified Paralegal	CP	National Association of Legal Assistants; NALA, The Paralegal Association
Advanced Certified Paralegal	ACP	National Association of Legal Assistants; NALA, The Paralegal Association
Accredited Legal Professional	ALP	NALS (formerly the National Association of Legal Secretaries)
Professional Legal Secretary	PLS	NALS (formerly the National Association of Legal Secretaries)
Professional Paralegal	PP	NALS (formerly the National Association of Legal Secretaries)
Professional Registered Parliamentarian	PRP	National Association of Parliamentarians
Registered Paralegal	RP	NFPA (National Federation of Paralegal Associations)
Registered Parliamentarian	RP	National Association of Parliamentarians
CORE Registered Paralegal	CRP	NFPA (National Federation of Paralegal Associations)
Indiana Registered Paralegal	IRP	Indiana State Bar Association
North Carolina State Bar Certified Paralegal	NCCP	North Carolina State Bar
South Carolina Certified Paralegal	SCCP	South Carolina Bar

Additionally, many jurisdictions grant some or all judges the right to use postnominal letters, which they generally employ in place of "Esq." The most common is "J." (for "Judge" or "Justice"), but more complex systems exist. For instance, in New Jersey, Judges of the New Jersey Superior Court are entitled to the postnomials "J.S.C.", except for the a Presiding Judges of the Family, Civil, Criminal, and General Equity Parts in a vicinage (entitled to the letters "P.J.F.P.", "P.J. Civ. P.", "P.J. Cr. P.", and "P.J. Ch. P."), a vicinage assignment judge (entitled to "A.J.S.C."), Appellate Division judges ("J.A.D.") and the Presiding Judge of the Appellate Division ("P.J.A.D."). Justices of the Supreme Court of New Jersey are entitled to the simple postnominal "J.", except for the Chief Justice, who uses "C.J."

== Supply chain, logistics, and transportation ==
Name	Designation	Agency
Certified Professional in Supply Management	CPSM	Institute for Supply Management (ISM)
Certified Professional in Supplier Diversity	CPSD	Institute for Supply Management (ISM)
Certified Professional Logistician	CPL	International Society of Logistics
Certified in Production & Inventory Management	CPIM	Association for Supply Chain Management (ASCM)
Certified in Transformation for Supply Chain	CTSC	Association for Supply Chain Management (ASCM)
Certified Supply Chain Analyst	CSCA	International Supply Chain Education Alliance (ISCEA)
Certified Supply Chain Professional	CSCP	Association for Supply Chain Management (ASCM)
Certified Transportation Professional	CTP	National Private Truck Council
Certified in Logistics, Transportation and Distribution	CLTD	Association for Supply Chain Management (ASCM)
Airline Transport Pilot	ATP	United States Federal Aviation Administration (FAA)
Commercial Pilot	CP	United States Federal Aviation Administration (FAA)
Certified Flight Instructor	CFI	United States Federal Aviation Administration (FAA)
Certified Flight Instructor Instrument	CFII	United States Federal Aviation Administration (FAA)
Certified Member	CM	American Association of Airport Executives (AAAE)
Accredited Airport Executive	AAE	American Association of Airport Executives (AAAE)

== Medicine and health care ==
Name	Post-nominal	Explanation or Issuing Agency
Professional Practice Degrees (required for state licensure)
Doctor of Chiropractic	DC	A professional doctoral degree for Chiropractors
Doctor of Dental Medicine	DMD	A professional doctoral degree for Dentists
Doctor of Dental Surgery	DDS	A professional doctoral degree for Dentists
Doctor of Medical Science	DMSc, DMS	A professional degree for physician assistants
Doctor of Health Science	DHSc	A professional degree for health scientists
Doctor of Medicine	MD	A professional doctoral degree for allopathic Physicians
Doctor of Naturopathic Medicine	ND, NMD	A professional doctoral degree for naturopathic Physicians
Doctor of Nurse Anesthesia Practice	DNAP	A professional doctoral degree for Nurse Anesthetists
Doctor of Nursing Practice	DNP	A professional doctoral degree for Nurse Practitioners
Doctor of Occupational Therapy	OTD	A professional doctoral degree for Occupational Therapists
Doctor of Optometry	OD	A professional doctoral degree for Optometrists
Doctor of Osteopathic Medicine	DO	A professional doctoral degree for osteopathic Physicians
Doctor of Pharmacy	PharmD	A professional doctoral degree for Pharmacists
Doctor of Physical Therapy	DPT	A professional doctoral degree for Physical Therapists
Doctor of Physician Assistant Studies	DPAS	A professional doctoral degree for Physician Assistants
Doctor of Science in Physician Assistant Studies	DScPAS	A professional doctoral degree for Physician Assistants
Doctor of Podiatric Medicine	DPM	A professional doctoral degree for Podiatrists
Doctor of Public Health	DrPH	A professional doctoral degree for Public Health professionals
Doctor of Psychology	PsyD	A professional doctoral degree for clinical Psychologists
Doctor of Speech-Language Pathology	SLPD	A professional doctoral degree for Speech-Language Pathologists
Master of Physician Assistant Studies	MPAS, MSc	The minimum degree required for licensure as a Physician Assistant
Master of Science in Speech-Language Pathology	MS-SLP	The minimum degree required for licensure as a Speech-Language Pathologist
Master of Science in Nursing	MSN	A professional master's degree for Registered Nurses
Bachelor of Science in Nursing	BSN	A professional bachelor's degree for Registered Nurses
Associate Degree in Nursing	ASN or ADN	The minimum degree required for licensure as a Registered Nurse
Associate Degree in Paramedicine	AAS	The minimum degree required for licensure as a Paramedic
State Licensure (post-nominals different than degree)
Certified Nursing Assistant	CNA	Assistive personnel who are state-licensed and work under the direction of a Registered Nurse
Emergency Medical Technician	EMT	An EMT must be certified by the NREMT to be eligible for initial state licensure
Advanced Emergency Medical Technician	AEMT	An AEMT must be certified by the NREMT to be eligible for initial state licensure
Paramedic	NRP	An NRP must be certified by the NREMT to be eligible for initial state licensure
Licensed Clinical Social Worker	LCSW	State-licensed Social Worker
Licensed Master Social Worker	LMSW	State-licensed Social Worker
Licensed Practical Nurse	LPN	Licensed by a state board of nursing and works under the direction of a Registered Nurse
Licensed Vocational Nurse	LVN	Licensed by a state board of nursing and works under the direction of a Registered Nurse
Nurse Practitioner	NP	State-licensed Advanced Practice Registered Nurse
Advanced Practice Nurse	APN	State-licensed Advanced Practice Registered Nurse
Advanced Practice Registered Nurse	APRN	State-licensed Advanced Practice Registered Nurse
Certified Registered Nurse Anesthetist	CRNA	State-licensed Advanced Practice Registered Nurse
Certified Nurse Midwife	CNM	State-licensed Advanced Practice Registered Nurse
Occupational Therapist	OT	State-licensed Occupational Therapist
Physician Assistant	PA-C	A Physician Assistant must be certified by the NCCPA to be eligible for initial state licensure
Physical Therapist	PT	State-licensed Physical Therapist
Registered Dental Hygienist	RDH	State-licensed Dental Hygienist
Registered Dietitian	RD or RDN	A Registered Dietitian must be certified by the Commission on Dietetic Registration to be eligible for initial state licensure
Registered Nurse	RN	State-licensed Registered Nurse
Registered Pharmacist	RPh	State-licensed Pharmacist
Registered Respiratory Therapist	RRT or CRT	A Respiratory Therapist must be certified by the NBRC to be eligible for initial state licensure
Speech-Language Pathologist	CCC-SLP	State-licensed Speech-Language Pathologist
Fellowships
Fellow of the American Academy of Family Physicians	FAAFP	American Academy of Family Physicians
Fellow of the American Society for Parenteral and Enteral Nutrition	FASPEN	American Society for Parenteral and Enteral Nutrition
Fellow of the American Geriatrics Society	AGSF	American Geriatrics Society
Fellow of the American Academy of Neurology	FAAN	American Academy of Neurology
Fellow of the American Society of Health-System Pharmacists	FASHP	American Society of Health-System Pharmacists
Fellow of the American Academy of Emergency Physicians	FAAEP	American Academy of Emergency Physicians Board of Certification in Emergency Medicine American Association of Physician Specialists
Fellow of the American College of Emergency Physicians	FACEP	American College of Emergency Physicians
Fellow of the Aerospace Medical Association	FAsMA	Aerospace Medical Association
Fellow of the Academy of Emergency Medical Services	FAEMS	National Association of EMS Physicians
Fellow of the Academy of Operational Medicine	FAOM	Academy of Operational Medicine
Fellow of the Academy of Wilderness Medicine	FAWM	Wilderness Medical Society
Fellow of the American Academy of Pediatrics	FAAP	American Academy of Pediatrics
Fellow of the American College of Cardiology	FACC	American College of Cardiology
Fellow of the American College of Dentists	FACD	American College of Dentists
Fellow of the American College of Endocrinology	FACE	American College of Endocrinology
Fellow of the American College of Epidemiology	FACE	American College of Epidemiology
Fellow of the American College of Physicians	FACP	American College of Physicians
Fellow of the American Heart Association	FAHA	American Heart Association
Fellow of the American Vein & Lymphatic Society	FACPh	American Vein & Lymphatic Society
Fellow of the American College of Surgeons	FACS	American College of Surgeons
Fellow of the American Academy of Orthopaedic Surgeons	FAAOS	American Academy of Orthopaedic Surgeons
Fellow of the American Academy of Neurological Surgeons	FAANS	American Academy of Neurological Surgeons
Fellow of the American College of Foot and Ankle Surgeons	FACFAS	American College of Foot and Ankle Surgeons
Fellow of the American College of Osteopathic Family Physicians	FACOFP	American College of Osteopathic Family Physicians
Fellow of the American Congress of Obstetricians and Gynecologists	FACOG	American Congress of Obstetricians and Gynecologists
Fellow of the American Psychiatric Association	FAPA	American Psychiatric Association
Fellow of the Infectious Diseases Society of America	FIDSA	Infectious Diseases Society of America
Certifications (not required for licensure)
American Board of Professional Psychology	ABPP	Qualification beyond state licensure currently in 13 specialties, including clinical, school, and forensic psychology
Basic Life Support Instructor	BLS-I	Any credentialing organization that conforms to the recent International Liaison Committee on Resuscitation guidelines for Basic Life Support.
Certified Genetic Counselor	CGC	The American Board of Genetic Counseling (ABGC) is the credentialing organization for the genetic counseling profession in the United States and Canada. The ABGC certifies and recertifies qualified genetic counseling professionals. In this way, the work of the ABGC protects the public and promotes the ongoing growth and development of the genetic counseling profession.
Certified Dietitian or Certified Dietitian Nutritionist	CD or CDN	(State) Department of Health. Minimum degree and practice requirements for certification as a Certified Dietitian or Certified Dietitian Nutritionist. Must be certified or eligible for certification by the Commission on Dietetic Registration to be eligible for initial state certification (must be eligible to hold RD/RDN credentials [Registered Dietitian/Registered Dietitian Nutritionist credentials]).
Certified Eating Disorder Specialist	CEDS	International Association of Eating Disorder Professionals
Certified Health Education Specialist	CHES	National Commission for Health Education Credentialing, Inc.
Certified Nutritionist	CN	(State) Department of Health. Minimum degree required for certification as a Certified Nutritionist.
Credentialed Professional Gerontologist	CPG	National Association for Professional Gerontologists
Master Certified Health Education Specialist	MCHES	National Commission for Health Education Credentialing, Inc.
Certified Director of Assisted Living	CDAL	Senior Living Certification Commission (SLCC) is a nonprofit corporation, autonomous from Argentum, with its own governing Board of Commissioners. SLCC offers a voluntary certification program for assisted living executive directors.
Certified Healthcare Simulation Educator	CHSE	Society for Simulation in Healthcare
Certified Healthcare Simulation Educator (Advanced)	CHSE-A	Society for Simulation in Healthcare
Certified Healthcare Simulation Operations Specialist	CHSOS	Society for Simulation in Healthcare
Certified Health Physicist	CHP	Certification as a professional health physicist awarded by the American Board of Health Physics and the American Academy of Health Physics.
Diplomate of the American Board of Health Physics	DABHP	Certification as a professional health physicist awarded by the American Board of Health Physics and the American Academy of Health Physics.
Registered Radiation Protection Technologist	RRPT	Registration as a Radiation Protection Technologist by meeting the required standards set forward by the National Registry of Radiation Protection Technologists.
Certified HIPAA Professional	CHP	
Certified Professional in Infection Control	CIC	
Certified Hospice and Palliative Licensed Nurse	CHPLN	must hold a current, unrestricted practical/vocational nurse license in the United States or its territories and must have hospice and palliative licensed practical/vocational nursing practice of 500 hours in the most recent 12 months or 1000 hours in the most recent 24 months before applying for the examination.
Certified HIPAA Security Expert	CHSE	Intermediate level certification for covered entities and business associates' employees who need to validate their HIPAA Security knowledge. This certification is primarily intended for IT staff, security consultants, and members of the security compliance team.
Certified HIPAA Security Specialist	CHSS	
Certified in Medical Quality	CMQ	American College of Medical Quality (ACMQ)
Certified Orthotist	CO	Certified by the American Board for Orthotist/Prosthetics Certification (ABC)
Certified Sex Therapist	CST	
Certified Tissue Banking Specialist	CTBS	
Certified Wound, Ostomy, and Continence Nurse	CWOCN, CWCN, COCN, CCCN or CWON	Must hold a bachelor's degree in Nursing and complete WOC Education Program accredited by the WOCN Society. Certification must be re-established every five years.
Diplomate of the American Board of Medical Physics	DABMP	
Diplomate of the American Board of Radiology	DABR	
Diplomate of the American Board of Science in Nuclear Medicine	DABSNM	
National Board for Certification in Hearing Instrument Sciences	NBC-HIS	The achievement of this designation represents the initiative to excel beyond the standard requirements for operating a hearing instrument dispensing practice. The designation, BC-HIS (Board Certified in Hearing Instrument Sciences), distinguishes the Board Certificant's outstanding skills and professional expertise needed for completion of the National Competency Exam.
Board Certified Critical Care Paramedic	CCP-C	International Board of Specialty Certification (IBSC)
Board Certified Flight Paramedic	FP-C	International Board of Specialty Certification (IBSC)
Board Certified Community Paramedic	CP-C	International Board of Specialty Certification (IBSC)
Board Certified Tactical Paramedic	TP-C	International Board of Specialty Certification (IBSC)
Board Certified Tactical Responder	TR-C	International Board of Specialty Certification (IBSC)
Board Certified Designated Infection Control Officer	DICO-C	International Board of Specialty Certification (IBSC)
Board Certified Wilderness Paramedic	WP-C	International Board of Specialty Certification (IBSC) [In preparatory phase as of August, 2022]
Mobile Intensive Care Paramedic (Alaska)	MICP	MICPs are currently licensed by the Alaska State Medical Board
Certified Massage Therapist	CMT	Certification by individual state boards
Licensed Massage Therapist	LMT	Licensure by individual state boards Requires passing of NCETMB or MBLEx
Licensed Clinical Massage Therapist	LCMT	Licensure by individual state boards Requires passing of NCETMB or MBLEx; Clinical education specialized for health care practice
Licensed Midwife	LM	state or provincial licensing
Certified Professional Midwife	CPM	North American Registry of Midwives
Nationally Certified EMS Educator	NCEE	Education credential awarded by the National Association of EMS Educators upon demonstrated experience teaching EMS programs and earning a successful passing score on the National EMS Educator Certification (NEMSEC) Exam
Music Therapist- Board Certified	MT-BC	Certification Board for Music Therapists
Certified Occupational Therapy Assistant	COTA	State licensure; National Board for Certification of Occupational Therapists
Physical Therapy Assistant	PTA	State licensure
Certified in Public Health	CPH	National Board of Public Health Examiners
Medical Laboratory Scientist	MLS	American Society for Clinical Pathology
Medical Technologist	MT	State Licensure, American Medical Technologists
Medical Laboratory Technician	MLT	State Licensure, American Society for Clinical Pathology, American Medical Technologists
Licensed Professional Counselor	LPC or LCPC	State licensure
Licensed Associate Counselor	LAC	State licensure
Certified Tissue Bank Specialist	CTBS	American Association of Tissue Banks
National Board Certified Clinical Hypnotherapist	NBCCH	National Board for Certified Clinical Hypnotherapists
National Board Certified Clinical Hypnotherapist in Public Service	NBCCH-PS	National Board for Certified Clinical Hypnotherapists
National Board Certified Diplomate in Clinical Hypnotherapy	NBCDCH	National Board for Certified Clinical Hypnotherapists
National Board Certified Diplomate in Clinical Hypnotherapy in Public Service	NBCDCH-PS	National Board for Certified Clinical Hypnotherapists
National Board Certified Fellow in Clinical Hypnotherapy	NBCFCH	National Board for Certified Clinical Hypnotherapists
National Board Certified Fellow in Clinical Hypnotherapy in Public Service	NBCFCH-PS	National Board for Certified Clinical Hypnotherapists
Licensed Acupuncturist	L.Ac.	State licensure
Diplomate in Acupuncture	Dipl.Ac.	National Certification Commission for Acupuncture and Oriental Medicine
Diplomate in Oriental Medicine	Dipl.O.M.	National Certification Commission for Acupuncture and Oriental Medicine
Diplomate of the American Board of Family Medicine	DABFM	American Board of Family Medicine
Diplomate of the American Board of Medical Microbiology	D(ABMM)	American Board of Medical Microbiology
Diplomate of the American Board of Venous & Lymphatic Medicine	DABVLM	American Board of Venous & Lymphatic Medicine
Certified Aerospace Physiologist	CAsP	Aerospace Medical Association
Certified Pharmacy Technician	CPhT	Pharmacy Technician Certification Board
Certified Phlebotomy Technician	CPT	National Healthcareer Association
Certified Personal Trainer	CPT	Aerobics and Fitness Association of America, National Academy of Sports Medicine, American Council on Exercise, National Strength & Conditioning Association
Certified Athletic trainer	ATC	Board of Certification, Inc. May be restricted by state licensure.
Certified Medical Assistant	CMA	American Association of Medical Assistants
Registered Diagnostic Medical Sonographer	RDMS	American Registry for Diagnostic Medical Sonography
Registered Vascular Technologist	RVT	American Registry for Diagnostic Medical Sonography
Registered Diagnostic Cardiac Sonographer	RDCS	American Registry for Diagnostic Medical Sonography
Registered Musculoskeletal Sonographer	RMSKS	American Registry for Diagnostic Medical Sonography

== Military ==
Name	Post-nominal
United States Army	USA
United States Army Reserve	USAR
United States Navy	USN
United States Navy Reserve	USNR
United States Air Force	USAF
United States Air Force Reserve	USAFR
Civil Air Patrol	CAP
United States Marine Corps	USMC
United States Marine Corps Reserve	USMCR
United States Coast Guard	USCG
United States Coast Guard Auxiliary	USCG Aux
United States Space Force	USSF
Retired	(Ret.)
Veteran	(Vet.)

== Real estate ==
Name	Post-nominal	Agency
Right of Way Agent	RWA	International Right of Way Association
Right of Way Professional	RWP	International Right of Way Association
Senior Right of Way Agent	SRWA	International Right of Way Association
Member of the Appraisal Institute	MAI	Appraisal Institute
Senior Residential Appraiser	SRA	Appraisal Institute
Accredited Member	AM	American Society of Appraisers
Accredited Senior Appraiser	ASA	American Society of Appraisers
Real Property Administrator	RPA	Building Owners and Managers Association International
Facilities Management Administrator	FMA	Building Owners and Managers Association International
Systems Maintenance Technician	SMT	Building Owners and Managers Association International
Systems Maintenance Administrator	SMA	Building Owners and Managers Association International
High-Performance Sustainable Building Management	HP	Building Owners and Managers Association International
Counselor of Real Estate	CRE	The Counselors of Real Estate
Assessment Administration Specialist	AAS	International Association of Assessing Officers
Certified Assessment Evaluator	CAE	International Association of Assessing Officers
Cadastral Mapping Specialist	CMS	International Association of Assessing Officers
Personal Property Specialist	PPS	International Association of Assessing Officers
Residential Evaluation Specialist	RES	International Association of Assessing Officers
Master in Residential Marketing	MIRM	National Association of Home Builders
Certified Green Professional	CGP	National Association of Home Builders
Certified Graduate Builder	CGB	National Association of Home Builders
Certified Graduate Associate	CGA	National Association of Home Builders
Master Certified New Home Sales Professional	Master CSP	National Association of Home Builders
Certified Aging-in-Place Specialist	CAPS	National Association of Home Builders
Certified New Home Marketing Professional	CMP	National Association of Home Builders
Housing Credit Certified Professional	HCCP	National Association of Home Builders
Certified New Home Sales Professional	CSP	National Association of Home Builders
Graduate Master Remodeler	GMR	National Association of Home Builders
Graduate Master Builder	GMB	National Association of Home Builders
Certified Graduate Remodeler	CGR	National Association of Home Builders
Facilities Management Professional	FMP	International Facility Management Association
Sustainability Facility Professional	SFP	International Facility Management Association
Certified Facilities Manager	CFM	International Facility Management Association
Accredited Buyer's Representative	ABR	National Association of Realtors
Graduate Realtor Institute	GRI	National Association of Realtors
Accredited Land Consultant	ALC	National Association of Realtors
Certified International Property Specialist	CIPS	National Association of Realtors
Certified Property Manager	CPM	National Association of Realtors
Certified Commercial Investment Member	CCIM	National Association of Realtors
Certified Corporate Housing Professional	CCHP	Corporate Housing Providers Association
Member of the National Association of Appraisers	MNAA	National Association of Appraisers
General Appraiser	MRA	Massachusetts Board of Real Estate Appraisers
Residential Appraiser	RA	Massachusetts Board of Real Estate Appraisers

== Religion and theology ==
Name	Post-nominal	Agency
Doctor of Divinity	DD	Used by those who a theological seminary or university in the United States has granted an honorary degree.
Doctor of Theology	ThD	Used by those who have earned a doctorate in academic studies at a theological seminary or university. At those institutions offering it, it is considered a terminal degree in academic theology (at other institutions, it is the PhD or DPhil in theology).
Doctor of Ministry	DMin	Used by those who have earned a professional doctorate at a theological seminary or university.
Master of Theology	ThM	Used by those who have earned a master's in academic studies at a theological seminary or university.
Master of Divinity	MDiv	Used by those who have earned a master in academic studies at a theological seminary or university.
Certified Spiritual Director	CSD	Used by those who have earned certification at a theological seminary or university.
Board Certified Chaplain	BCC	Used by those who have earned certification by an accredited chaplain association.
Master of Theological Studies	MTS	Used by those who have earned a master's degree at a theological seminary or university.
Certified Church Business Administrator	CCA	National Association of Church Business Administrators
Knight/Dame of the Equestrian Order of the Holy Sepulchre of Jerusalem	KHS/DHS	Equestrian Order of the Holy Sepulchre of Jerusalem
Knight/Dame Commander of the Equestrian Order of the Holy Sepulchre of Jerusalem	KCHS/DCHS	Equestrian Order of the Holy Sepulchre of Jerusalem
Knight/Dame Commander with Star of the Equestrian Order of the Holy Sepulchre of Jerusalem	KC*HS/DC*HS	Equestrian Order of the Holy Sepulchre of Jerusalem
Knight/Dame Grand Cross of the Equestrian Order of the Holy Sepulchre of Jerusalem	GCHS	Equestrian Order of the Holy Sepulchre of Jerusalem

== Telecommunications and cable ==
Name	Post-nominal	Agency
Broadband Installation Professional	BPI	Society of Cable and Telecommunication Engineers / International Society of Broadband Experts
Broadband Premises Technician	BPT	Society of Cable and Telecommunication Engineers / International Society of Broadband Experts
Broadband Premises Expert	BPE	Society of Cable and Telecommunication Engineers / International Society of Broadband Experts
Business Class Services Specialist	BCSS	Society of Cable and Telecommunication Engineers / International Society of Broadband Experts
Broadband Distribution Specialist	BDS	Society of Cable and Telecommunication Engineers / International Society of Broadband Experts
Broadband Transport Specialist	BTS	Society of Cable and Telecommunication Engineers / International Society of Broadband Experts
Broadband TelecomCenter Specialist	BTCS	Society of Cable and Telecommunication Engineers / International Society of Broadband Experts
DOCSIS Engineering Professional	DEP	Society of Cable and Telecommunication Engineers / International Society of Broadband Experts
Digital Video Engineering Professional	DVEP	Society of Cable and Telecommunication Engineers / International Society of Broadband Experts
Internet Protocol Engineering Professional	IPEP	Society of Cable and Telecommunication Engineers / International Society of Broadband Experts

== Veterinary medicine ==
Name	Post-nominal	Agency
Doctor of Veterinary Medicine	DVM	A professional doctoral degree for veterinarians. VMD stands for the Latin "Veterinariae Medicinae Doctoris" and is exclusively conferred by the University of Pennsylvania School of Veterinary Medicine.
Doctor of Veterinary Medicine	VMD	A professional doctoral degree for veterinarians. VMD stands for the Latin "Veterinariae Medicinae Doctoris" and is exclusively conferred by the University of Pennsylvania School of Veterinary Medicine.
Diplomate of the American Board of Veterinary Practitioners	DABVP	Used by veterinarians who have pursued specialized training in a specific species and passed the board examination. The ABVP has 12 recognized specialty groups: Avian; Beef cattle; Canine and feline; Dairy; Equine; Exotic companion mammal; Feline; Fish; Food animal; Reptile and amphibian; Shelter medicine; Swine health management
Diplomate of the American Board of Veterinary Toxicology	DABVT	
Diplomate of the American College of Animal Welfare	DACAW	The diplomates of ACAW are specialized in the practice of advancing animal welfare and veterinary medical ethics.
Diplomate of the American College of Laboratory Animal Medicine	DACLAM	
Diplomate of the American College of Poultry Veterinarians	DACPV	
Diplomate of the American College of Theriogenologists	DACT	
Diplomate of the American College of Veterinary Anesthesia and Analgesia	DACVAA	
Diplomate of the American College of Veterinary Behaviorists	DACVB	
Diplomate of the American College of Veterinary Clinical Pharmacology	DACVCP	
Diplomate of the American College of Veterinary Dermatology	DACVD	
Diplomate of the American College of Veterinary Internal Medicine	DACVIM	Used by veterinary internal medicine specialists who have completed a post-doctoral internship and an accredited residency program. There are six concentrations that can be pursued: Cardiology; Small animal internal medicine; Large animal internal medicine; Neurology; Nutrition; Oncology
Diplomate of the American College of Veterinary Microbiologists	DACVM	There are four concentrations within this specialty: Bacteriology and mycology; Immunology; Parasitology; Virology
Diplomate of the American College of Veterinary Nephrology and Urology	DACVNU	Provisional recognition was granted by the American Board of Veterinary Specialties in 2022.
Diplomate of the American College of Ophthalmologists	DACVO	
Diplomate of the American College of Veterinary Pathologists	DACVP	Used by veterinarians who have pursued specialized training in either anatomic or clinical pathology and achieved board certification.
Diplomate of the American College of Veterinary Preventive Medicine	DACVPM	
Diplomate of the American College of Veterinary Radiology	DACVR	
Diplomate of the American College of Veterinary Sports Medicine and Rehabilitation	DACVSMR	
Diplomate of the American College of Veterinary Surgeons	DAVCS	Used by veterinarians who have pursued specialized training in either small or large animal surgery and achieved board certification.
Diplomate of the American College of Zoological Medicine	DACZM	
Diplomate of the American College of Veterinary Emergency and Critical Care	DACVECC	
Diplomate of the American Veterinary Dental College	DAVDC	
Certified Veterinary Technician	CVT	Credentialed veterinary nurses are recognized by titles that vary by state. All veterinary nurses are required to attend an AVMA-approved program and pass the Veterinary Technician National Exam to become credentialed.
Licensed Veterinary Medical Technician	LVMT	Credentialed veterinary nurses are recognized by titles that vary by state. All veterinary nurses are required to attend an AVMA-approved program and pass the Veterinary Technician National Exam to become credentialed.
Licensed Veterinary Technician	LVT	Credentialed veterinary nurses are recognized by titles that vary by state. All veterinary nurses are required to attend an AVMA-approved program and pass the Veterinary Technician National Exam to become credentialed.
Registered Veterinary Technician	RVT	Credentialed veterinary nurses are recognized by titles that vary by state. All veterinary nurses are required to attend an AVMA-approved program and pass the Veterinary Technician National Exam to become credentialed.
Veterinary Technician Specialist	VTS	Credentialed veterinary nurses can pursue specialized training in one of 16 NAVTA/CVTS-approved academies that specialize in subjects such as dentistry, ophthalmology, or internal medicine. Post-nominal titles typically include the specialty academy's abbreviation to indicate subject (e.g., Jane Doe, LVTS, ADVT).
Academy of Dermatology Veterinary Technicians	ADVT	
Academy of Equine Veterinary Nursing Technicians	AEEVT	
Academy of Internal Medicine for Veterinary Technicians	AIMVT	
Academy of Laboratory Animal Veterinary Technicians and Nurses	ALAVTN	
Academy of Physical Rehabilitation Veterinary Technicians	APRVT	
Academy of Veterinary Behavior Technicians	AVBT	
Academy of Veterinary Clinical Pathology Technicians	AVCPT	
Academy of Veterinary Dental Technicians	AVDT	
Academy of Veterinary Emergency & Critical Care Technicians and Nurses	AVEECTN	
Academy of Veterinary Nutrition Technicians	AVNT	
Academy of Veterinary Ophthalmic Technicians	AVOT	
Academy of Veterinary Surgical Technicians	AVST	
Academy of Veterinary Technicians in Anesthesia and Analgesia	AVTAA	
Academy of Veterinary Technicians in Clinical Practice	AVTCP	
Academy of Veterinary Technicians in Diagnostic Imaging	AVTDI	
Academy of Veterinary Zoological Medicine Technicians	AVZMT	
Certified Veterinary Assistant	CVA	
Approved Veterinary Assistant	AVA	
Certified Veterinary Healthcare Documentation Professional	CVHDP	
Certified Veterinary Practice Manager	CVPM	Awarded by the Veterinary Hospital Managers Association

== Workplace learning and performance ==
Name	Post-nominal	Agency
Certified Professional in Talent Development	CPTD	Association for Talent Development
Associate Professional in Talent Development	APTD	Association for Talent Development
Certified Performance Technologist	CPT	International Society for Performance Improvement
Certified Professional in Training Management	CPTM	Training Industry

== Other ==
Name	Post-nominal	Agency
Certified Customer Experience Professional	CCXP	Customer Experience Professionals Association
Certified Archivist	CA	Academy of Certified Archivists
Digital Archives Specialist	DAS	Society of American Archivists
Certified Energy Manager	CEM	Association of Energy Engineers (AEE)
Certified Energy Auditor	CEA	Association of Energy Engineers (AEE)
Certified Environmental Specialist	CES	OSHA
Certified At-Risk Adult Crime Tactics Specialist	CACTS	Georgia Department of Human Services
American Board Certified Teacher	ABCTE	American Board for Certification of Teacher Excellence
Associate Safety Professional	ASP	Board of Certified Safety Professionals
Associate in Risk Management	ARM	Insurance Institute of America
Associate Wildlife Biologist	AWB	The Wildlife Society
Certified Administrative Professional	CAP	International Association of Administrative Professionals (IAAP)
Certified Analytics Professional	CAP	INFORMS, Institute for Operations Research and the Management Sciences
Certified Anti-Terrorism Specialist	CAS	
Certified Assistant Refrigeration Operator	CARO	Refrigerating Engineers & Technicians Association
Certified Associate in Project Management	CAPM	Project Management Institute
Certified Biological Safety Professional	CBSP	ABSA International
Certified Broadcast Meteorologist	CBM or AMS	American Meteorological Society
Certified Cost Professional	CCP	AACE International
Certified Cost Technician	CST	AACE International
Certified Disability Specialist	CDS	
Certified E-Discovery Specialist	CEDS	Association of Certified E-Discovery Specialists
Certified Estimating Professional	CEP	AACE International
Certified Executive Pastry Chef	CEPC	American Culinary Federation, Inc.
Certified Forester	CF	Society of American Foresters
Certified Experience Analyst	CXA	Human Factors International
Certified Fire Protection Specialist	CFPS	
Certified Forensic Claims Consultant	CFCC	AACE International
Certified Forensic Interviewer	CFI	International Association of Interviewers
Certified Hazardous Materials Manager	CHMM	Institute of Hazardous Materials Management (IHMM)
Certified Industrial Refrigeration Operator	CIRO	Refrigerating Engineers & Technicians Association
Certified Manager	CM	
Certified Master Anti-Terrorism Specialist	CMAS	
Certified Modeling and Simulation Professional	CMSP	National Training and Simulation Association
Certified Professional in Accessibility Core Competencies	CPACC	International Association of Accessibility Professionals
Certified Professional in Web Accessibility	CPWA	International Association of Accessibility Professionals
Certified Professional Organizer	CPO	Board of Certification for Professional Organizers
Certified Professional Services Marketer	CPSM	Society for Marketing Professional Services
Certified Protection Professional	CPP	ASIS International, International Foundation for Protection Officers
Certified Protection Executive	CPE	National Protective Services
Certified Protection Officer	CPO	International Foundation for Protection Officers
Certified in Security Supervision and Management	CSSM	International Foundation for Protection Officers
Certified Institutional Protection Specialist	CIPS	International Foundation for Cultural Property Protection
Certified Visitor Relations Specialist	CVRS	International Foundation for Cultural Property Protection
Certified Public Relations Counselor	CPRC	Florida Public Relations Association
Certified Safety Professional	CSP	Board of Certified Safety Professionals
Certified Sales Engineer	CSE	Certified by the National Association of Sales Engineers (NAASE) via submission online
Certified Scheduling Technician	CST	AACE International
Certified Senior Advisor	CSA	Society of Certified Senior Advisors
Certified Systems Engineering Professional	CSEP	International Council on Systems Engineering
Certified Usability Analyst	CUA	Human Factors International
Certified Utility Safety Professional	CUSP	Utility Safety & Ops Leadership Network
Certified Wildlife Biologist	CWB	The Wildlife Society
Certified Youth Development Specialist	CYDS	
Credentialed Advocate	CA	National Advocate Credentialing Program, National Office for Victim Assistance. Designation indicates a professional victim advocate credential.
Designated Erosion Control Inspector	DECI	Lake County Stormwater Management
Decision & Risk Management Professional	DRMP	AACE International
Distinguished Toastmaster	DTM	The highest educational achievement in Toastmasters International
Divemaster	DM	Professional Association of Diving Instructors
Assistant Instructor	AI	Professional Association of Diving Instructors
Open Water Scuba Instructor	OWSI	Professional Association of Diving Instructors
Master Scuba Diver Trainer	MSDT	Professional Association of Diving Instructors
Master Instructor	MI	Professional Association of Diving Instructors
Course Director	CD	Professional Association of Diving Instructors
Doctor of Science	DSc or ScD	
Doctor of Management	D.M.	
Doctor of Musical Arts	DMA or D.M.A.	
Doctor of Arts	DA or D.A.	
Doctor of Naturopathic Medicine	ND or NMD	A professional doctoral degree for naturopathic practitioners in the United States. Holders of the ND or NMD degree are known as naturopathic physicians in states where they may be licensed. The designation NMD is used in Arizona.
Doctor of Business Administration	DBA or DrBA	
Doctor of Education	EdD or DEd	
Doctor of Philosophy	Ph.D.	
Doctor of Philosophy Candidate	ABD	Doctor of Philosophy Candidate ("all but dissertation")
Doctor of Philosophy Candidate	Ph.C.	Doctor of Philosophy Candidate
Doctor of Public Health	DrPH or Dr.PH	
Doctor of Emergency Management	DEM	
Doctor of Liberal Studies	DLS	
Doctorate of Strategic Security	DSS	Henley-Putnam University
Earned Value Professional	EVP	AACE International
Editor in the Life Sciences	ELS	Board of Editors in the Life Sciences
Fellow of The Explorers Club	FEC	The Explorers Club
Member of The Explorers Club	MEC	The Explorers Club
Fellow of the Society of Decision Professionals	FSDP	The Society of Decision Professionals
French Wine Scholar	FWS	
Investment Adviser Certified Compliance Professional	IACCP	Investment Adviser Association and National Regulatory Services
ISSP Sustainability Associate	ISSP-SA	International Society of Sustainability Professionals
ISSP Certified Sustainability Professional	ISSP-CSP	International Society of Sustainability Professionals
Licensed Funeral Director	FD	
Fellow of the National Speleological Society	FNSS	National Speleological Society
Master of Arts	MA or M.A.	
Master of Education	MEd or M. Ed.	
Master Training Specialist	MTS or M.T.S.	
Master of Fine Arts	MFA or M.F.A.	
Master of Liberal Arts	MLS or M.L.S.	
Master of Library Science	MLS or M.L.S.	
Master of Music	MM or M.M.	
Master of Science	MS or M.S.	
Master of Engineering Management	MEM or MME or MSEM	
Master of Business Administration	MBA or M.B.A.	
Master of Business and Science	MBS	
Master of Public Administration	MPA or M.P.A.	
Master of Transportation Safety Administration	MTSA	
Member of the ACE	ACE	American Cinema Editors
Member of the ASC	ASC	American Society of Cinematographers
Member of the CSA	CSA	Casting Society of America
Member of the MPSE	MPSE	Motion Picture Sound Editors
Mobile Certified Marketer	MCM	Mobile Marketing Association
Multi Sport Athlete	MSA	
National Board Certified Teacher	NBCT	
Nationally Certified School Psychologist	NCSP	National Association of School Psychologists
NERC Certified System Operator	NCSO	NERC Personnel Subcommittee (PS) and Personnel Certification Governance Committee (PGSC)
Planning & Scheduling Professional	PSP	AACE International
Producers Mark	PGA	Producers Guild of America. The post-nominal letters are only used on film credits as a certification mark that certifies that the credited film producer performed a major portion of the film's producing duties.
Portfolio Management Professional	PfMP	Project Management Institute
Professional Certified Investigator	PCI	
Professional Manager Certification	PMC	The Air University
Program Management Professional	PgMP	Project Management Institute
Project Management Professional	PMP	Project Management Institute
Professional Operator	PO	Water Professionals International
Professional Science Masters	PSM	
Sports Industry Management	SIM	Sports Management Worldwide, Inc. (SMWW); Columbia University at New York; New York University (NYU)
Qualified SWPPP Designer	QSD	California Stormwater Quality Association
Qualified SWPPP Practitioner	QSP	California Stormwater Quality Association
Registered Business Analyst	RBA	American Academy of Financial Management
Registered Construction Inspector (Division I, II, III, or IV)	RCI	American Construction Inspectors Association
Registered Archaeologist	RA	Registry of Professional Archaeologists
Registered Piano Technician	RPT	Piano Technicians Guild
Registered Professional Archaeologist	RPA	Registry of Professional Archaeologists
Registered Resort Professional	RPP	American Resort Development Association (ARDA)
Registered Quality Assurance Professional in Good Clinical Practices	RQAP-GCP	Society of Quality Assurance
Registered Quality Assurance Professional in Good Laboratory Practices	RQAP-GLP	Society of Quality Assurance
Registered Quality Assurance Professional in Good Manufacturing Practices	RQAP-GMP	Society of Quality Assurance
RETA Authorized Instructor	RAI	Refrigerating Engineers & Technicians Association
Systems Security Certified Practitioner	SSCP	
Web Accessibility Specialist	WAS	International Association of Accessibility Professionals
Utility Management Certification	UMC	National Rural Water Association The Utility Management Certification (UMC) is the first credential to acknowledge an operator’s expertise in managing a water or wastewater utility. The UMC has become a standard for recognizing management expertise and potential for advancement.

== See also ==
- Credential
- Licensure
- Tech certificate
- List of post-nominal letters
- Professional association
