= Operator (profession) =

Profession that involves the operation of specific equipment or service

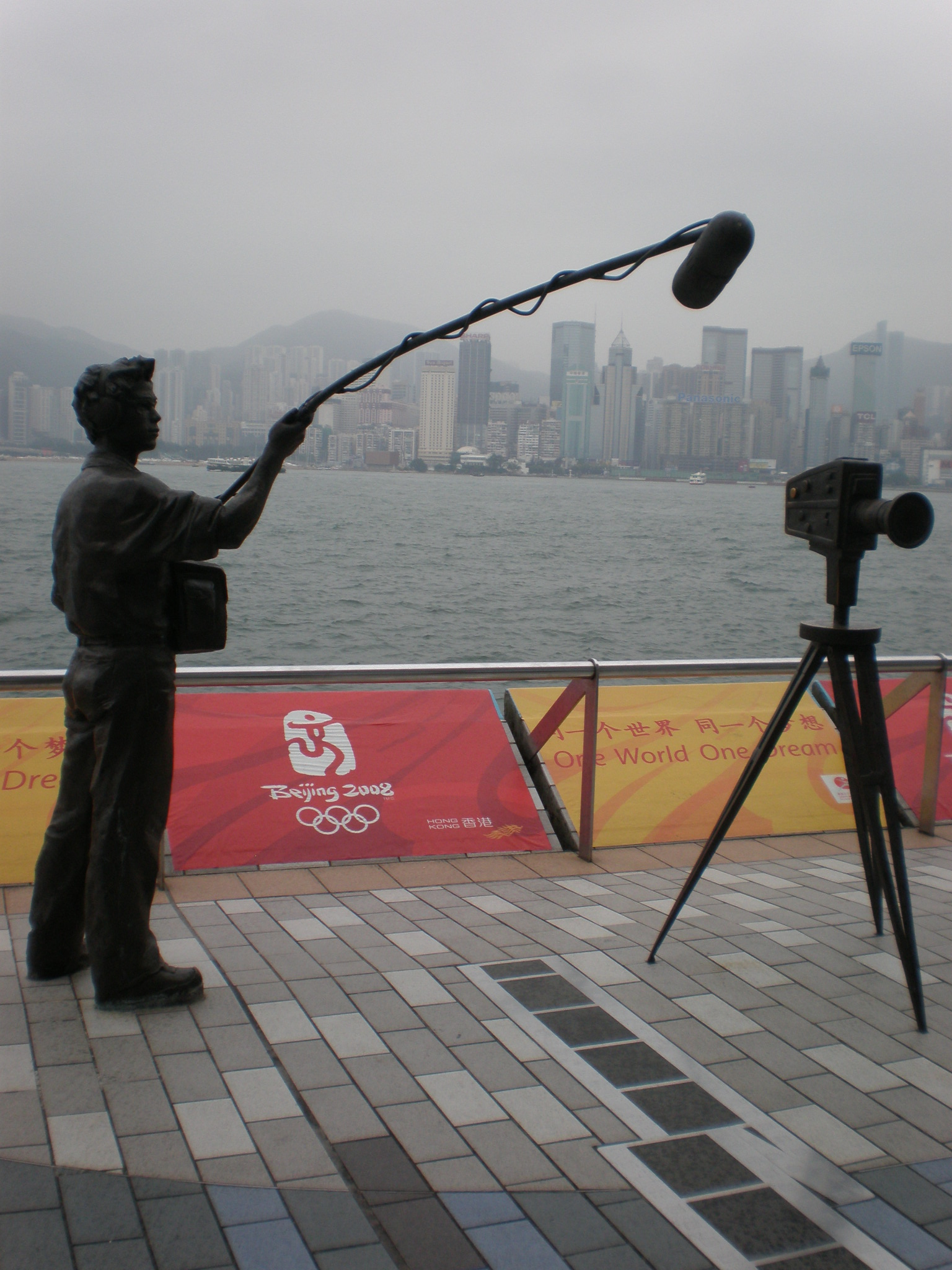
Statue of a boom operator on the Avenue of Stars in Hong Kong.

An operator is a professional designation used in various industries, including horse-drawn vehicles, broadcasting (in television and radio), computing, power generation and transmission, customer service, physics, and construction. Operators are day-to-day end users of systems, that may or may not be mission-critical, but are typically managed and maintained by technicians or engineers. They might also work on a 24-hour rotating shift schedule.

== Types of operators ==
Broadcasting

- Technical operator, transmission controller or broadcast operator:
  - Master control (MCR) operator
  - Production control room (PCR) operator
  - Transmission control room (TCR) operator
  - Video tape operator (VTO)
  - Certified Television Operator (CTO) by Society of Broadcast Engineers (SBE)
  - Certified Radio Operator (CRO) operator - by (SBE)
- Studio technical operator (gallery operator):
  - Vision mixer operator - technical director (TD)
  - Sound and comms (talkback) studio operator

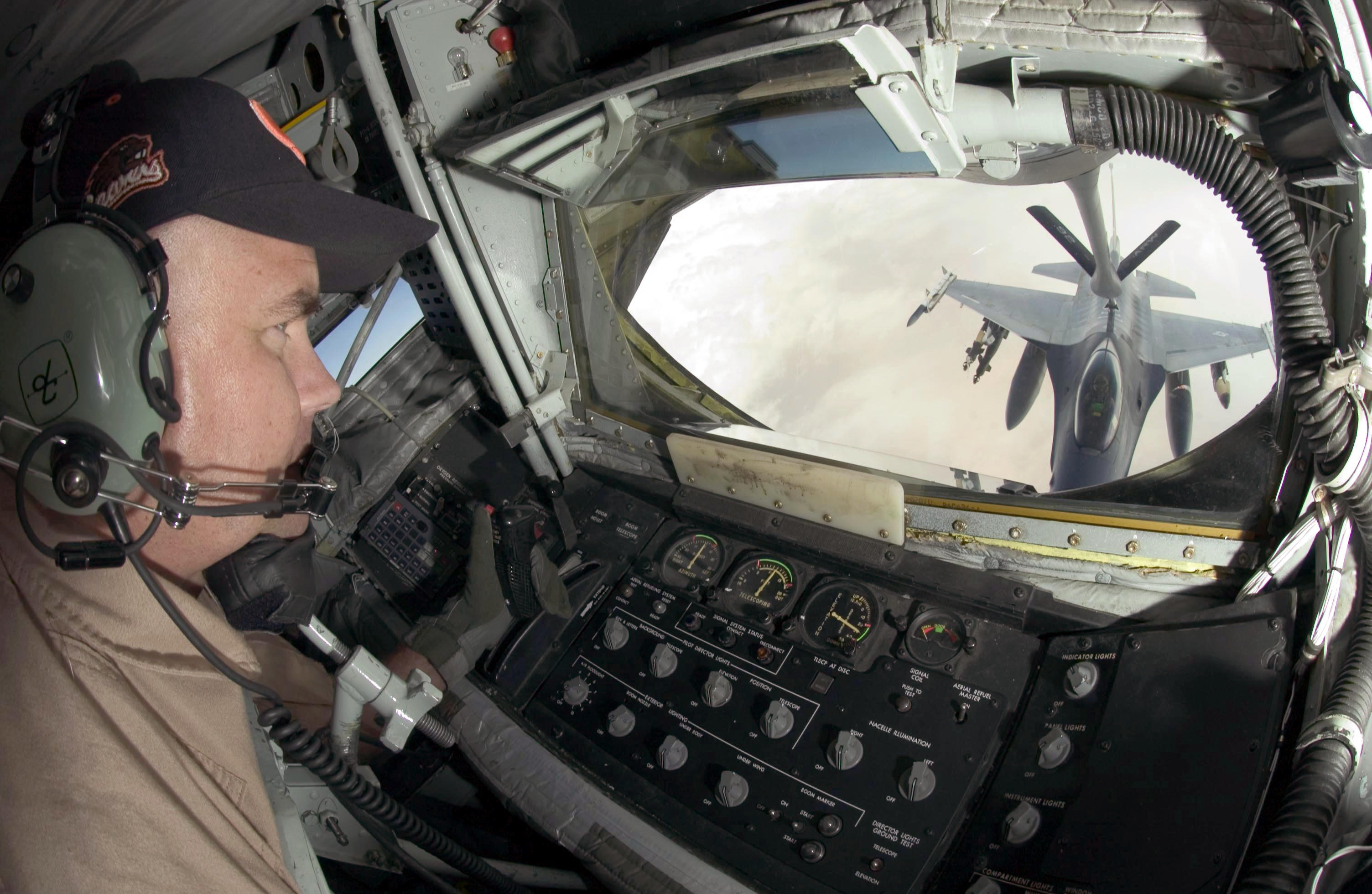
KC-135 Boom operator

- Camera operator
  - Jib (camera) operator
- Boom operator
- Dolly grip operator

Other

- Computer operator
- Network operations center (NOC) operator
- Crane operator
- Radio operator
- Satellite controller
- Switchboard operator
- Winch operator
- Nuclear power plant operator

== Gallery ==
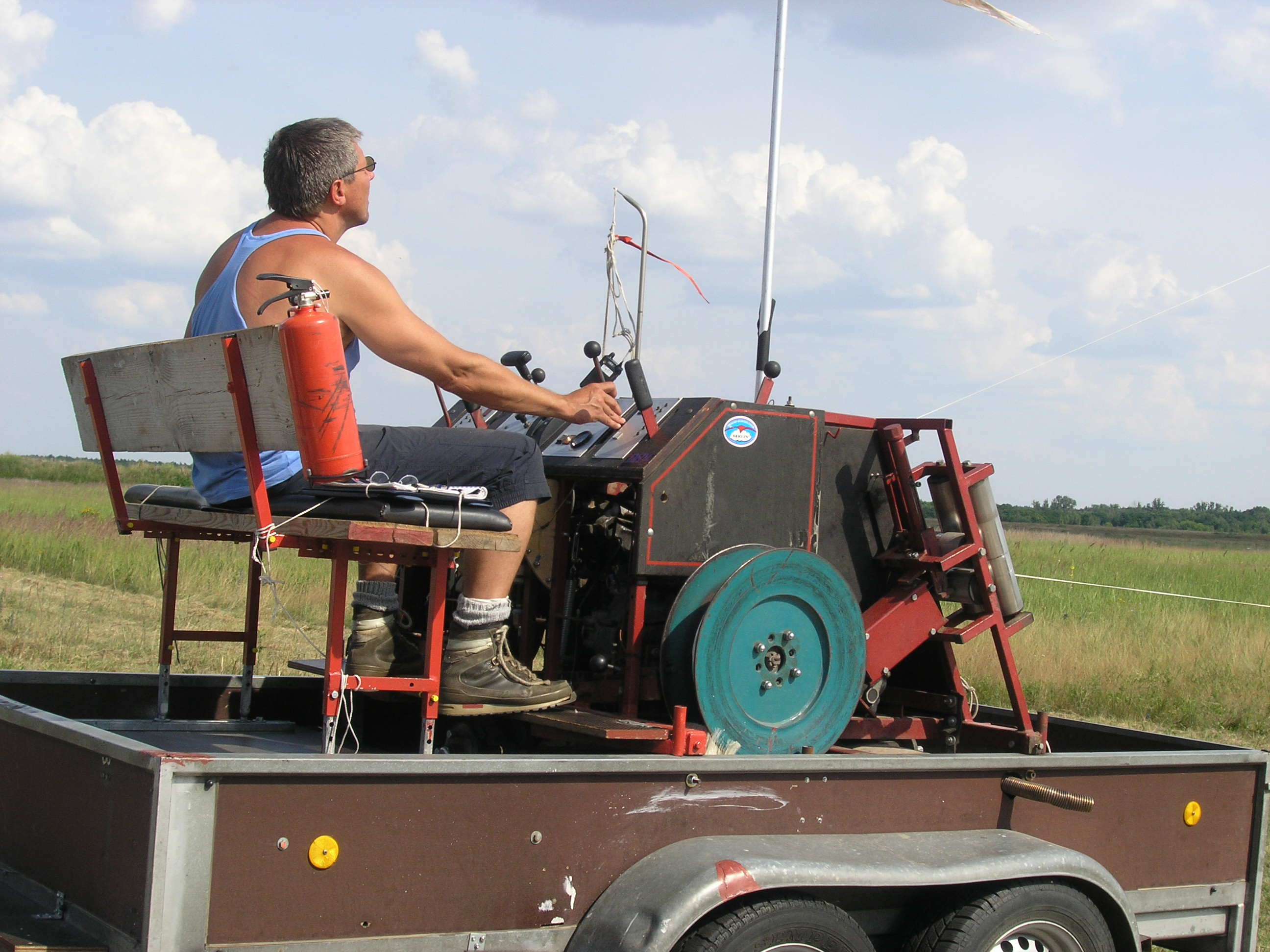
Operator of a stationary winch, launching a hang glider.

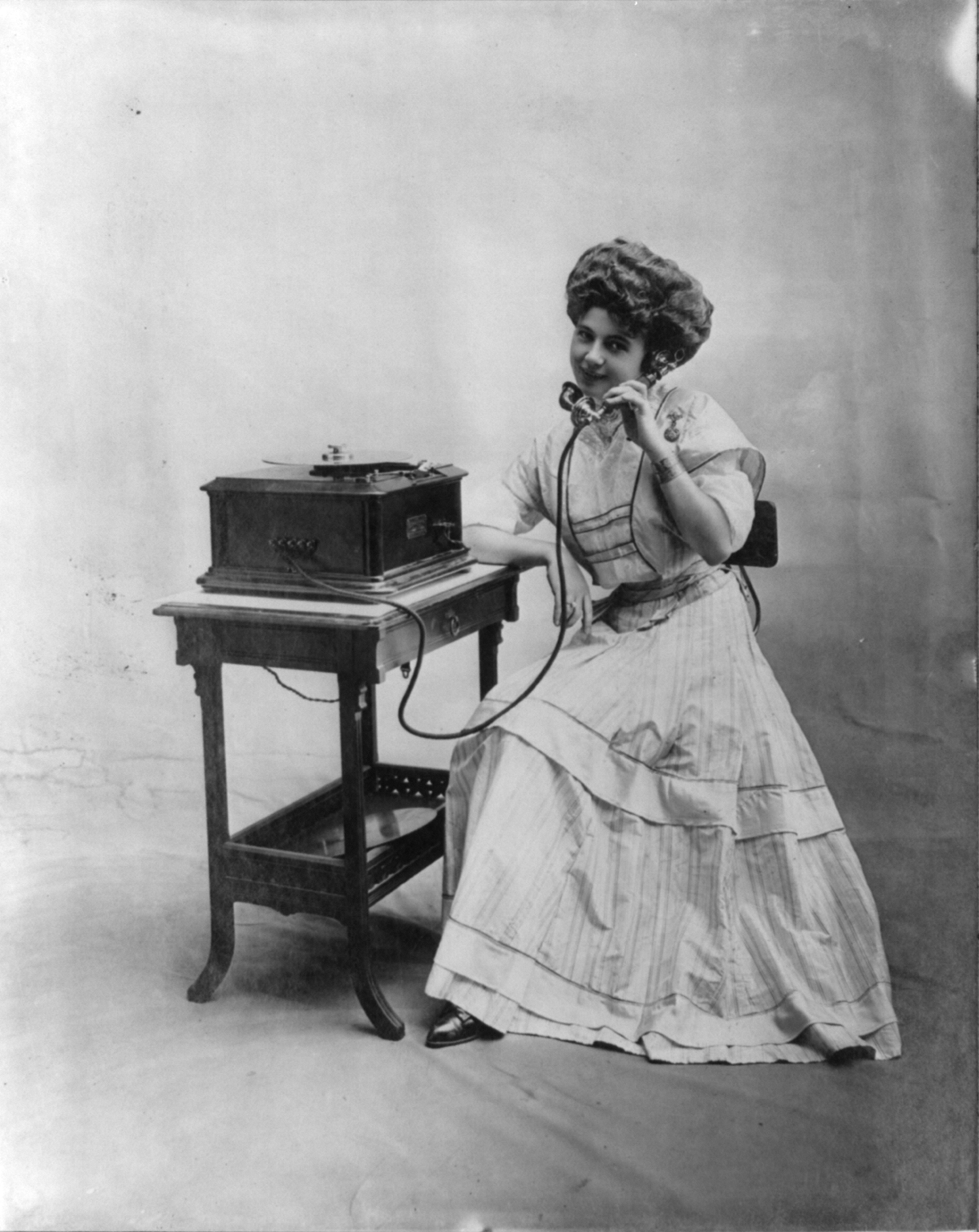
Telegraphone with operator
