= Cleveland Institute of Electronics =

Technical College in Cleveland, Ohio, United States

- Former name: Smith Practical Radio Institute
- Motto: A School of thousands. A class of one. Since 1934.
- Type: Private, for-profit technical college
- Active: 1934–September 30, 2022
- Affiliations: Society of Broadcast Engineers
- President: John R. Drinko
- Dean: Keith Conn
- Students: Over 1,000 World Wide
- Location: Cleveland, Ohio, United States
- Campus: Urban
- Website: cie-wc.edu

Cleveland Institute of Electronics (CIE) was a privately held, for-profit, distance learning technical college located in Cleveland, Ohio, United States. CIE permanently closed on September 30, 2022.

CIE offered Diplomas and Certificates from a variety of electronics and computer technology programs. The school was certified through the Ohio State Board of Career Colleges and Schools to offer post secondary programs of electronics technology, computer technology and electronic engineering technology.

== History ==
The Institute was established in 1934 by Carl E. Smith under the name Smith Practical Radio Institute to provide correspondence learning courses in the field of Radio and Electronics, and has attracted an international student body since its inception. In 1972, enrollment reached 40,000 students from 70 countries. In 1992, a wholly owned subsidiary, World College, was added to CIE, but this subsidiary college has since closed in Summer of 2014. CIE permanently closed on September 30, 2022.

== Innovations ==
In 1956, Cleveland Institute of Electronics conceptualized and patented its "Auto-Programmed" method, a new approach to curriculum presentation.

In the 1960s, Carl Smith commissioned Pickett & Eckel Company to manufacture a slide rule tailored toward the school's course modules. The model became known as the Pickett N515-T Electronic Slide Rule.

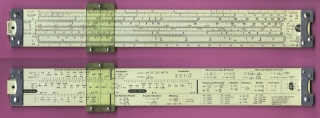
The Pickett N515-T CIE Electronic Slide Rule. Image courtesy of Mike Konshak, Curator, International Slide Rule Museum.

== Programs of study ==
CIE offered numerous certificates and diplomas in Electronics, Broadcast Engineering Technology (Leading to CBT designation by the Society of Broadcast Engineers), and Computing fields.

=== Undergraduate Diplomas and Certificates ===
- Broadcast Engineering
- CompTIA A+ Certification and Computer Technology
- Network+ Certification and Computer Technology
- Programming with Java and C#
- Engineering
- Electronics Technology and Advanced Troubleshooting I & II
- Electronics Technology with Digital and Microprocessor Laboratories
- Electronics Technology with FCC License Preparation
- Electronics Technology with Laboratory
- Industrial Electronics with PLC Technology
- Introduction to Computers and Microsoft Office
- Introduction to Home Automation Installation
- Introduction to Photovoltaic Systems
- Wireless and Electronic Communications

=== Associate's of Applied Science Degrees ===
- A.A.S. in Computer Information Technology and Systems Management
- A.A.S. in Electronic Engineering Technology
- A.A.S. in Software Engineering
- Bachelor in Electronic Engineering Technology - via World College
- Bachelor in Computer Information Technology and Systems Management - Via World College
