= NPTC =

NPTC may refer to

- National Park Travelers Club
- National Private Truck Council
- National Proficiency Tests Council, specialists for agricultural land based qualifications in the UK
- Neath Port Talbot College, further education institution in Wales, United Kingdom
