= CFPS =

CFPS is an abbreviation which can refer to:

- Cell-free protein synthesis
- Certified Fire Protection Specialist
- China Family Panel Studies
- cubic foot per second - cubic foot flow rate
- CFPS-FM
