= IAAP =

IAAP may refer to:

- International Association for Analytical Psychology
- International Association of Accessibility Professionals
- International Association of Administrative Professionals
- Iowa Army Ammunition Plant
