= Certified audio engineer =

Certified Audio Engineer (CEA) is a title granted to an individual that successfully meets the experience and examination requirements of the certification. The certification is regulated by the Society of Broadcast Engineers.

The SBE certifications were created to recognize individuals who practice in career fields which are not regulated by state licensing programs. Audio engineering is not a concern of civil or governmental regulation.

== See also ==
- List of post-nominal letters
