= DRB =

DRB may refer to:

- Defence Research and Development Canada, the Canadian Defence Research Board
- Deshastha Rigvedi Brahmins
- Deutsche Reichsbahn, the German Imperial Railways or its wartime locomotive classes such as the DRB Class 50
- Deutscher Richterbund, the German Association of Judges
- 5,6-Dichloro-1-beta-D-ribofuranosylbenzimidazole, a chemical compound that inhibits gene transcription
- Digital Radio Broadcast Specialist, a professional title regulated by the Society of Broadcast Engineers
- Douay–Rheims Bible
- DRB-HICOM, a Malaysian automotive company
- The Dublin Review of Books, a literary publication based in Ireland
- The IATA airport code for Derby Airport (Western Australia) in Western Australia
