= CSRE =

CSRE may refer to:

- Centre of Studies in Resources Engineering of the Indian Institute of Technology Bombay
- Certified Senior Broadcast Radio Engineer of the Society of Broadcast Engineers
