= Certified video engineer =

Certified Video Engineer (CEV) is a title granted to an individual that successfully meets the experience and examination requirements of the certification. The certification is regulated by the Society of Broadcast Engineers. The CEV title is protected by copyright laws. Individuals who use the title without consent from the Society of Broadcast Engineers could face legal action.

The SBE certifications were created to recognize individuals who practice in career fields which are not regulated by state licensing programs. Video engineering is not a concern of civil or governmental regulation.
