= IFPO =

IFPO may refer to:

- International Foundation for Protection Officers
- Institut français du Proche-Orient; the French Institute of the Near East
