= Theodore I. Koskoff =

American lawyer

Theodore I. Koskoff (June 23, 1913 – March 13, 1989) was an American trial lawyer. Described as "one of Connecticut's most widely known trial lawyers," Koskoff was the chairman of the Bridgeport, Connecticut-based Koskoff, Koskoff & Bieder law firm and led several legal professional associations.

Koskoff was born in New Haven, Connecticut on June 23, 1913, and was as the youngest of seven children born to Israel and Hattie Koskoff. He graduated from Wesleyan University and received his law degree from Boston University School of Law in 1936. He was a solo practitioner from 1937 until 1972, when he became chairman of Koskoff, Koskoff & Bieder, which also included his son and partner Michael P. Koskoff. Koskoff was lead defense counsel in the New Haven Black Panther trials of the 1970s and represented Black Panther Lonnie McLucas, who was charged with kidnapping and conspiracy. Koskoff also represented Dare to be Great salesman Glen Turner and F. Lee Bailey.

Koskoff was "well-known for his efforts to improve the image of his profession and to persuade his colleagues to give legal assistance to people unable to obtain it on their own." He served as president of the Association of Trial Lawyers of America (ATLA) from 1979 to 1980. He also served as president of its Connecticut affiliate, the Connecticut Trial Lawyers Association. Koskoff also founded and was chairman of the National Board of Trial Advocacy, a board certification organization, and founded the Roscoe Pound-American Trial Lawyers Foundation (now the Pound Civil Justice Institute). Koskoff was also instrumental in the establishment of the National Advocacy College educational programs at several law schools across the country.

Koskoff died in 1989 at the age of 75 of a heart attack while being driven to a doctor's office in Milford. At the time of his death he lived in Westport.
