= Certified professional broadcast engineer =

Certified Professional Broadcast Engineer (CPBE) is a title granted to an individual who already holds an SBE Senior Broadcast Engineer certification or registered as a professional electrical engineer and also successfully meets the experience and reference requirements of the certification. The certification is regulated by the Society of Broadcast Engineers (SBE). The CPBE title is protected by copyright laws. Individuals who use the title without consent from the Society of Broadcast Engineers could face legal action.

The SBE certifications were created to recognize individuals who practice in career fields which are not regulated by state licensing or Professional Engineering programs. Broadcast Engineering is regulated at the national level and not by individual states.

== See also ==
- List of post-nominal letters
