= Certified broadcast television engineer =

Certified Broadcast Television Engineer (CBTE) is a title granted to an individual who successfully meets the experience and examination requirements of the certification. The certification is regulated by the Society of Broadcast Engineers (SBE). The CBTE title is protected by copyright laws. Individuals who use the title without consent from the Society of Broadcast Engineers could face legal action.

Broadcast Television engineers, also known as broadcast engineering technicians, set up and operate video and audio equipment for television or radio broadcasts. At small stations, their work might involve all aspects of production, while at large stations, each engineer might have his or her own specialized tasks. Work hours might include nights and weekends because of 24-hour broadcasting. Heavy lifting may be involved when setting up equipment, and maintenance functions might call for climbing towers or poles.

The SBE certifications were created to recognize individuals who practice in career fields which are not regulated by state licensing or Professional Engineering programs. Marine Radio and radar systems still require a Federal Communications Commission (FCC) license apart from an SBE certification. Broadcast Engineering is regulated at the national level, and not by individual states.

== See also ==
- List of post-nominal letters
