= Certified broadcast networking engineer =

Professional certification

Certified Broadcast Networking Engineer (CBNE) is a title granted to an individual that passes the exam requirements of the certification. The certification is regulated by the Society of Broadcast Engineers (SBE) and shows competence in computer network equipment and their specialized applications in radio and television broadcast stations. The CBNE title is protected by copyright laws. Individuals who use the title without consent from the Society of Broadcast Engineers could face legal action.

The SBE certifications were created to recognize individuals who practice in career fields which are not regulated by state licensing or Professional Engineering programs.

== See also ==
- List of post-nominal letters
