= Certified radio operator =

Certified Radio Operator (CRO) is a title granted to an individual in the United States who passes the examination requirements of the certification. The certification is regulated by the Society of Broadcast Engineers. The CRO title is protected by copyright laws.

The U.S. Federal Communications Commission (FCC) previously required radio announcers to hold a Third-class License, which was later relaxed to simply require a Restricted Operator's Permit. There is currently no FCC requirement for radio announcers. The Radio Operator Certification exam covers much of the information required for a Third-class license, and demonstrates proficiency in radio station operation.

The SBE certifications were created to recognize individuals who practice in career fields which are not regulated by state licensing programs. Radio announcers are no longer regulated at the national level.

== See also ==
- List of post-nominal letters
