= Camera operator =

Professional operator of a film or video camera

A camera operator at the 2020 FIS Cross-Country World Cup

A camera operator, or depending on the context cameraman or camerawoman, is a professional operator of a film camera or video camera as part of a film crew.

== Duties and functions ==
In filmmaking, the cinematographer or director of photography (DP or DoP) is responsible for bringing the director's vision to life on screen. The cinematographer handles all the technical aspects of visual storytelling and is the head of the camera crew and light crew on the set. The DP may operate the camera themselves, or enlist the aid of a camera operator or second cameraman to operate it or set the controls. The first assistant cameraman (1st AC), also known as a focus puller, is responsible for maintenance of the camera, such as clearing dirt from the film gate and adjusting the follow focus. A second assistant cameraman (2nd AC), also known as a clapper loader, might be employed to load film, slate scenes, or maintain the camera report (a log of scenes, takes, rolls, photographic filters used, and other production data).

A camera operator in a video production may be known by titles like television camera operator, video camera operator, or videographer, depending on the context and technology involved, usually operating a professional video camera. As of 2016, there were approximately 59,300 television, video, and motion picture camera operators employed in the United States.

Important camera operator skills include choreographing and framing shots, knowledge of and the ability to select appropriate camera lenses, and other equipment (dollies, camera cranes, etc.) to portray dramatic scenes. The principles of dramatic storytelling and film editing fundamentals are also important skills. Camera operators are also required to communicate clearly and concisely, especially on productions with time and film budget constraints.

== Gallery ==
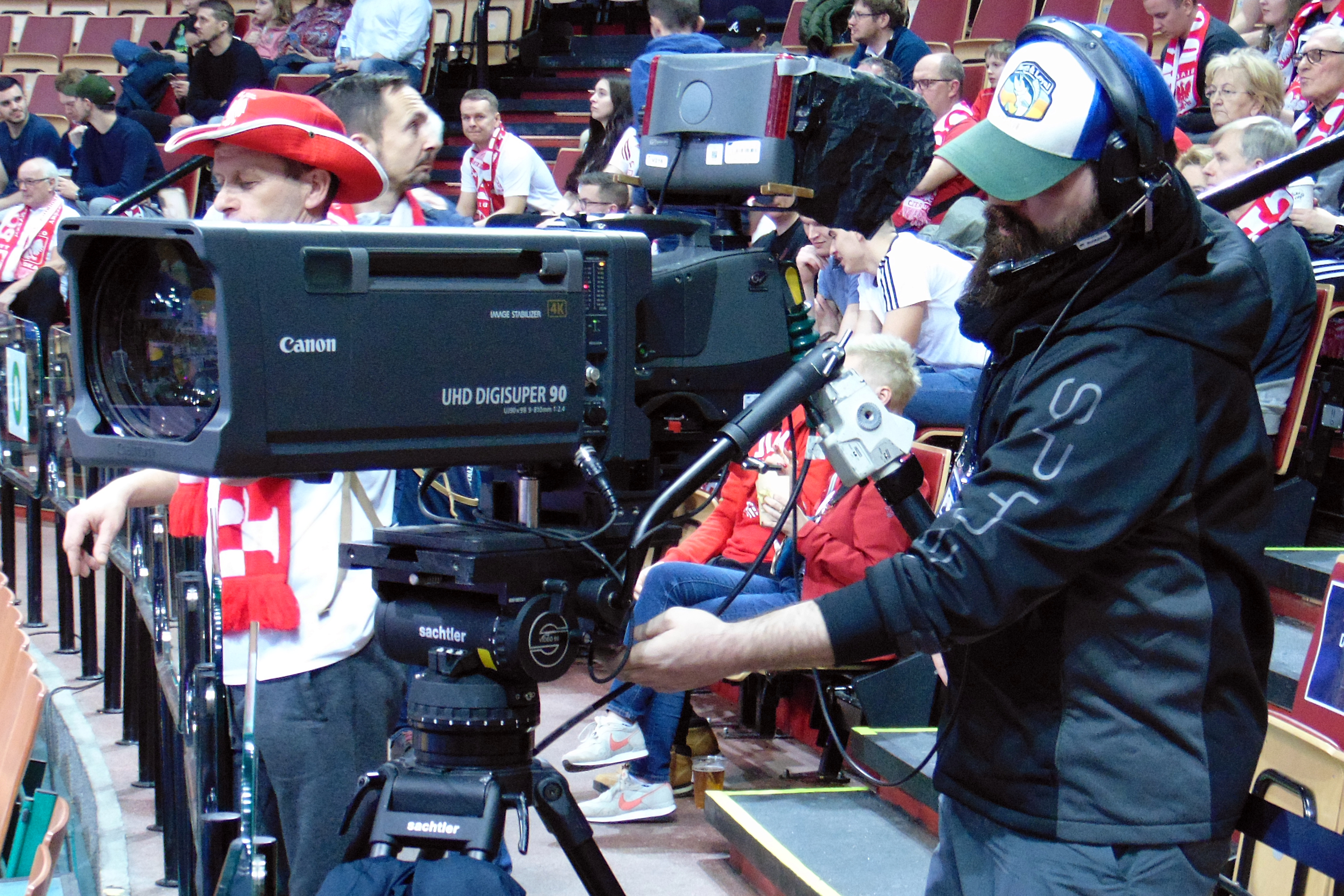
Camera operator in a sports stadium 2023 World Men's Handball Championship

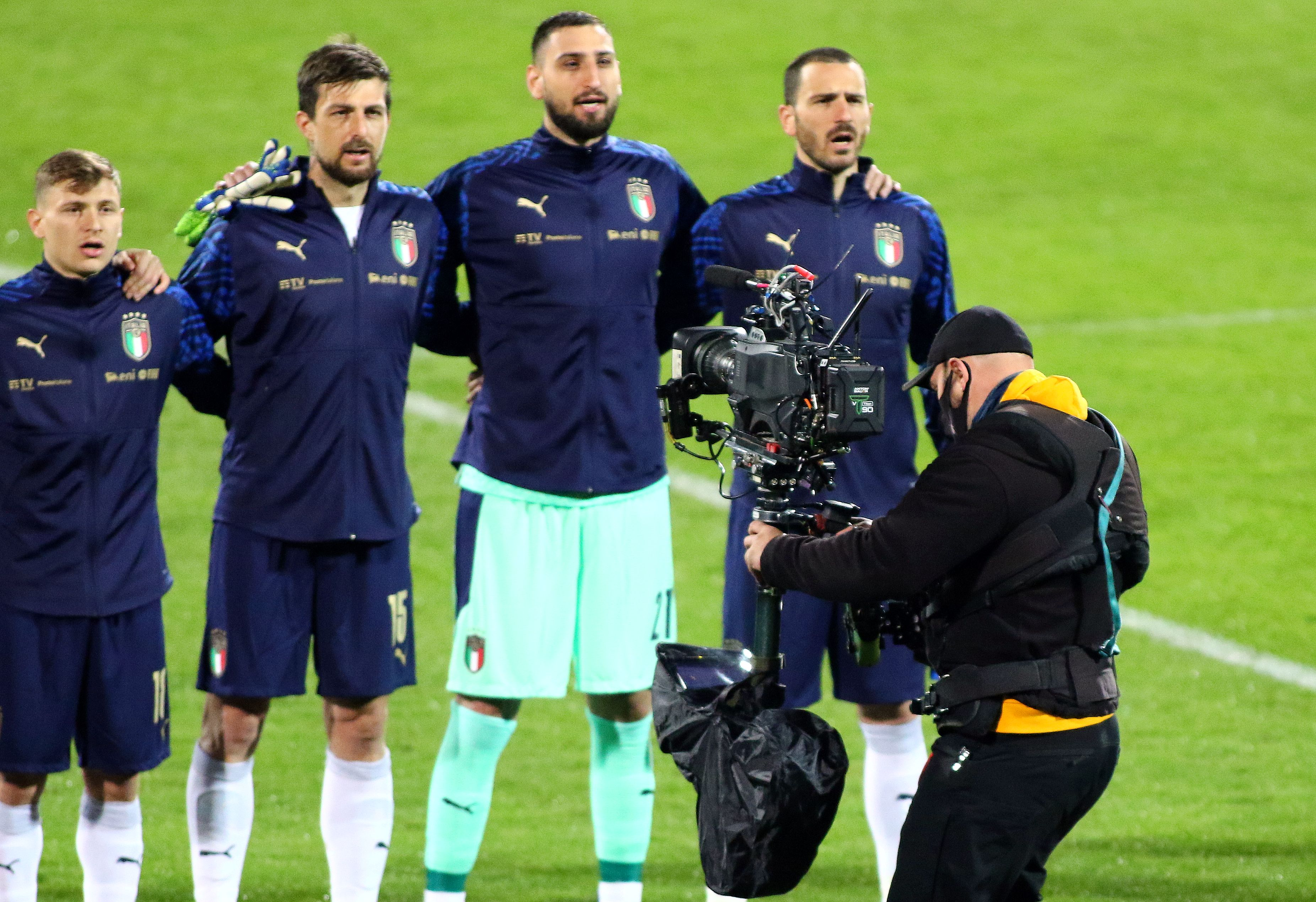
A football camera operator shoots the Italy national team before a match (2021)

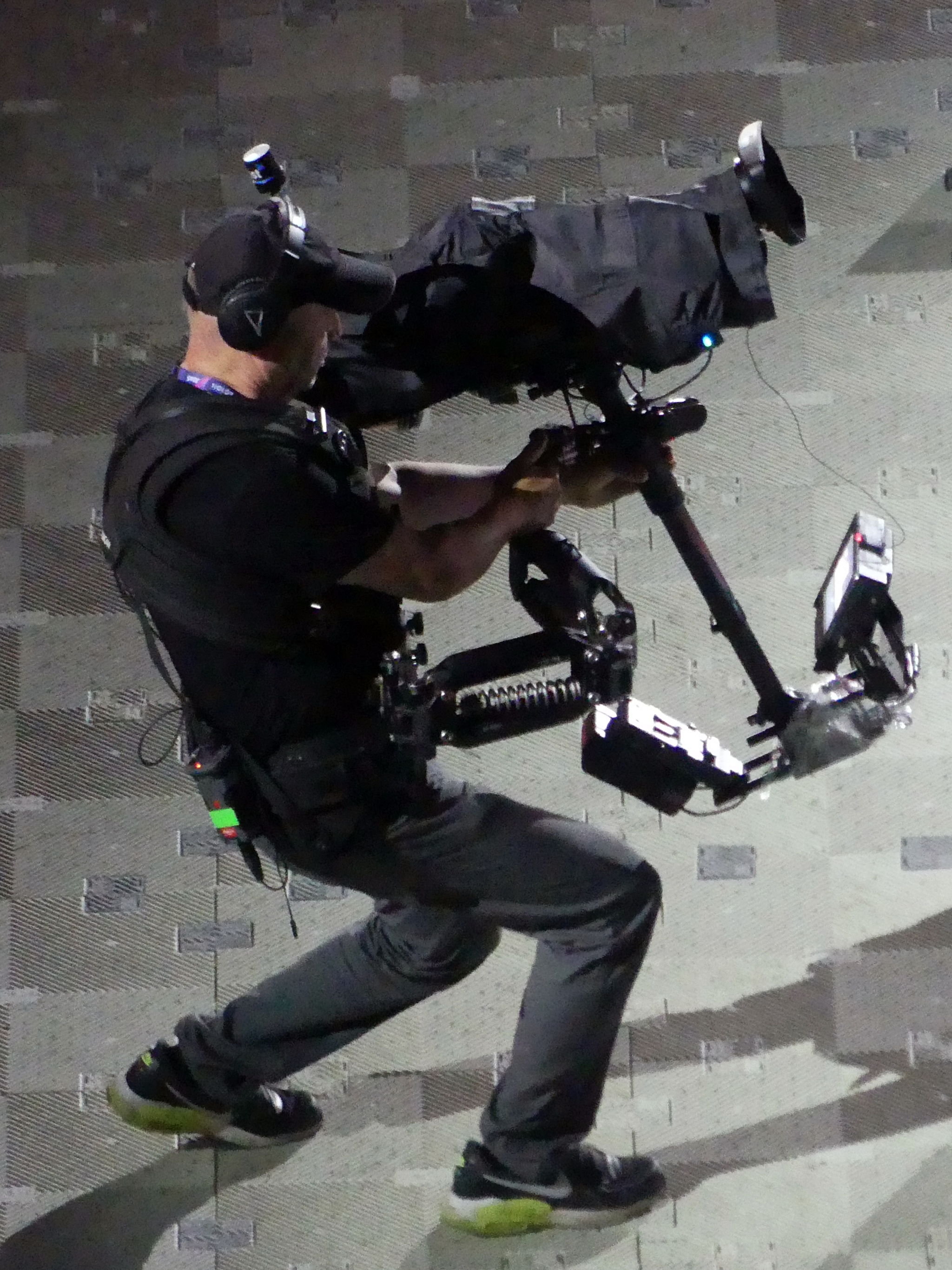
Camera operator during 2023 European Games

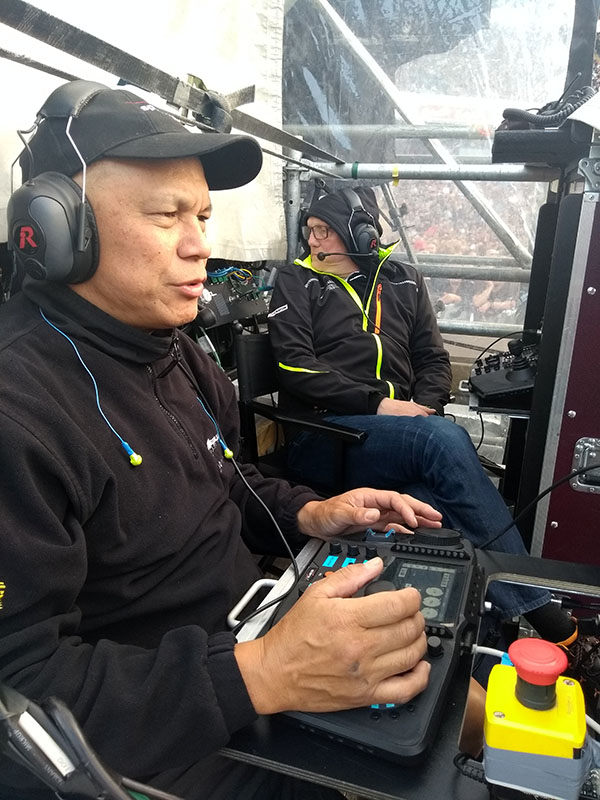
Cameramen operating Newton stabilized remote heads on spidercam cablecam systems flying over the audience at Metallica tour (2019)

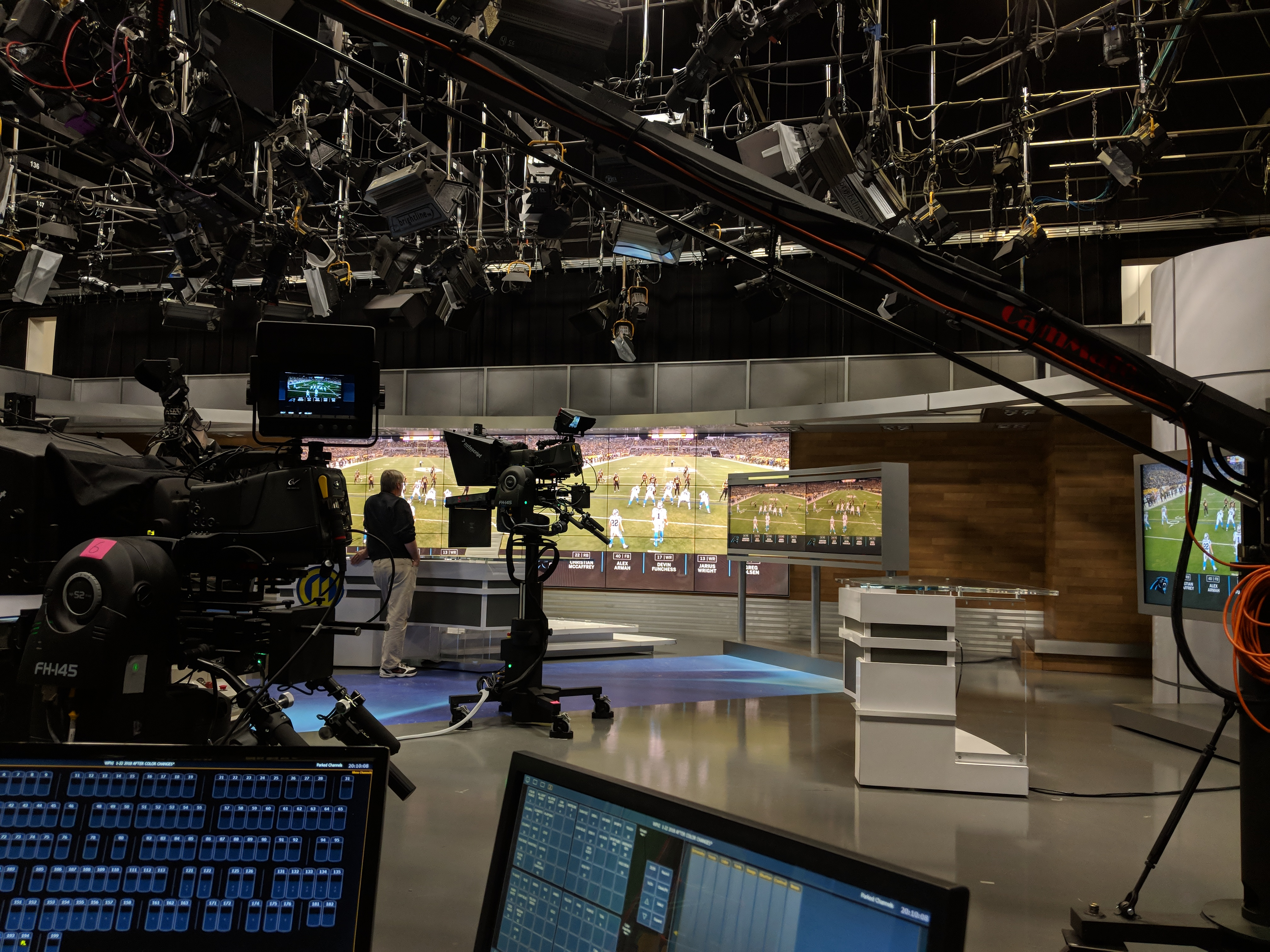
A live TV studio cameraman watches a football game on the monitors in the studio in between broadcasts (2018)

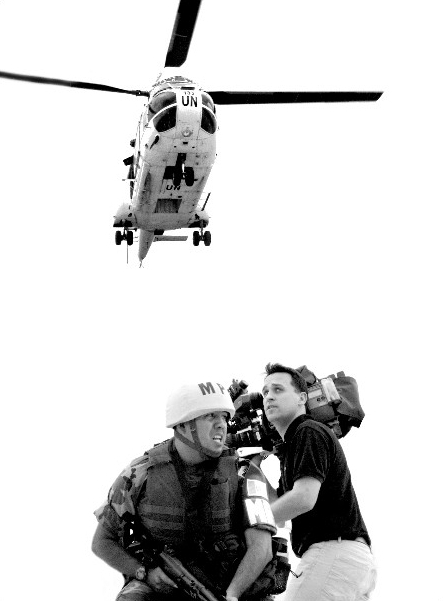
War camera operator (2006)

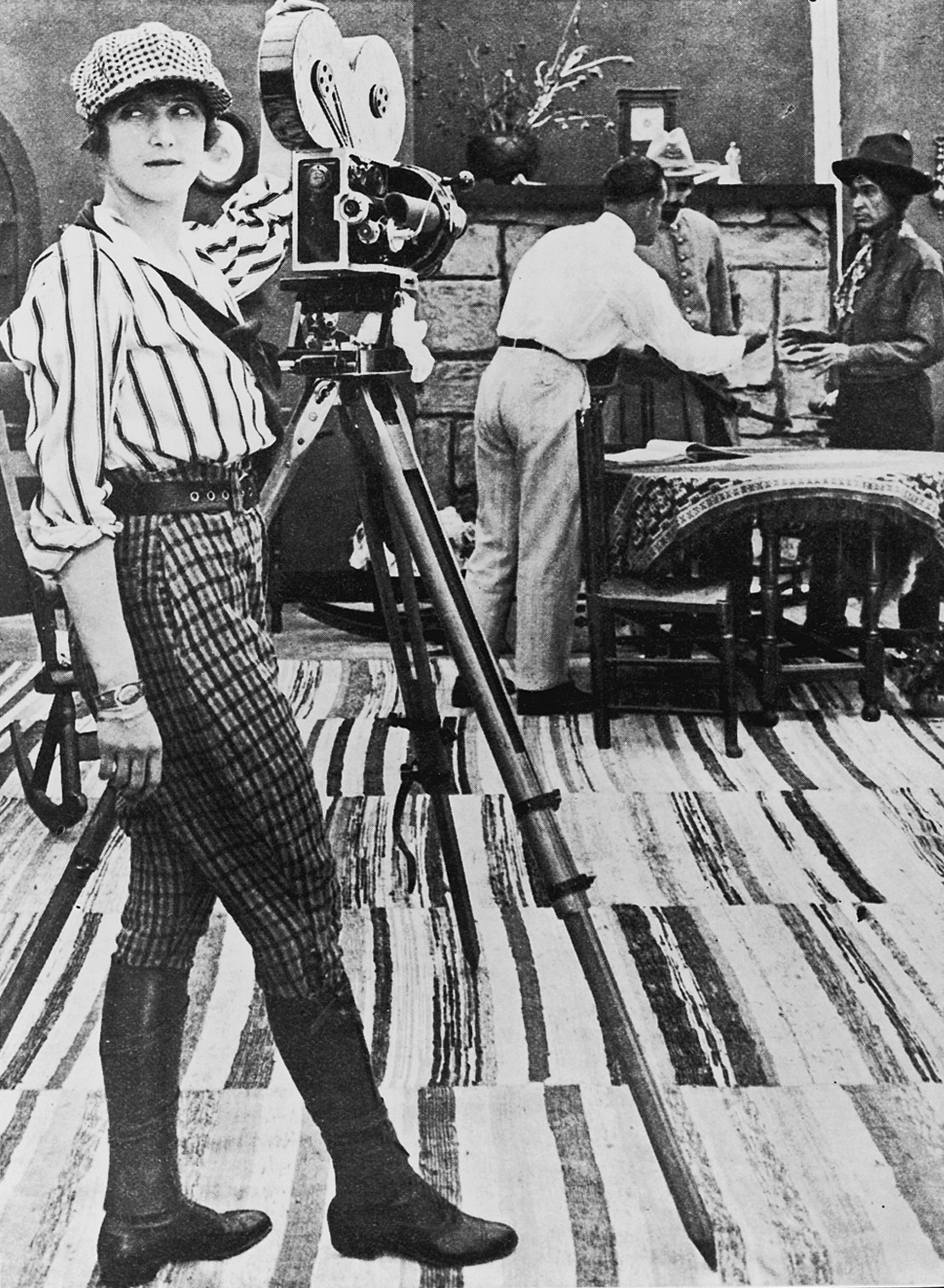
Margery Ordway, one of the first women camera operators of the silent film era (1916)

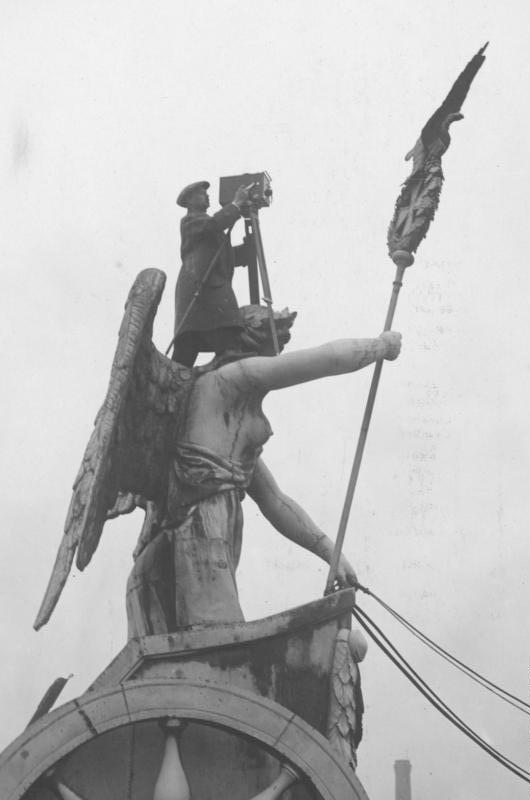
A camera operator atop Brandenburg Gate (1926)
