= Society for Simulation in Healthcare =

- The society's logo
- Abbreviation: SSH
- Formation: 2004; 22 years ago
- Type: Nonprofit
- Purpose: medical education and administration
- Headquarters: Minneapolis, Minnesota, U.S.
- Website: https://www.ssih.org/
- Formerly called: Society for Medical Simulation

The Society for Simulation in Healthcare (SSH), formerly known as the Society for Medical Simulation is a non-profit organization founded in 2004 to advance the application of medical simulation in healthcare. It serves as a resource for young professionals in their growth in medical education and administration.

== History ==
The society was formed was founded as a nonprofit organization in 2004.

The society formally changed its name in February 2006 to the Society for Simulation in Healthcare (SSH) in an attempt to increase appeal to non-physician healthcare providers.

By the end of 2006, membership in the organization was just over 1,500 people. Membership continued to steadily grow to be over 3,000 people by 2012.

== Annual meeting ==
The first annual International Meeting on Medical Simulation (IMMS) was held in 1995. The SSH has wholly supported the meeting since 2006. In 2007, the IMMS meeting was renamed to become International Meeting for Simulation in Healthcare (IMSH).

== Simulation in Healthcare ==
Simulation in Healthcare is the journal of the SSH. The journal was first published in January 2006 with Dr. David Gaba as the founding Editor in Chief. The journal is published by Lippincott Williams & Wilkins.

The SSH was envisioned as an umbrella organization and the journal also serves as the official publication for other groups such as the Australian Society for Simulation in Healthcare.

The journal is indexed by National Library of Medicine.

== SSH accreditation ==
In 2010 the SSH Council for Accreditation of Healthcare Simulation Programs began an accreditation process for simulation centers to show that they are performing at the high standards recommended by the organization. In addition to university or hospital based education programs, the Clinical Simulation Program for the American College of Chest Physicians (ACCP) became the first medical association to become accredited by the SSH in 2013. As of 2015, there have been fifty-four programs in six countries have passed the accreditation process.

The SSH has also partnered with groups such as the Association of Standardized Patient Educators (ASPE) in conducting these surveys.

== Certification ==
The need for a “uniform mechanism to educate, evaluate, and certify simulation instructors for the health care profession” was recognized by McGaghie et al. in their critical review of simulation-based medical education research. In 2012 the SSH piloted two new certifications to provide recognition to educators in an effort to meet this need. By the end of 2012 the final programs were in place.

The SSH Certified Healthcare Simulation Educator (CHSE) program was established to provide “formal professional recognition of your specialized knowledge, skills, abilities and accomplishments in simulation education.” The CHSE had been issued to 600 simulationists in 17 countries by 2015. The National Council of State Boards of Nursing cited CHSE as a recommended certification in their 2015 NCSBN Simulation Guidelines for Prelicensure Nursing Programs. The CHSE-A (Advanced) certification was designed to further distinguish simulationists as a “simulation expert and leader in the field”.

The SSH Certified Healthcare Simulation Operations Specialist (CHSOS) program was established to provide “an inclusive “umbrella” term that embodies many different roles within healthcare simulation operations, including simulation technician, simulation technology specialist, simulation specialist, simulation coordinator, simulation AV specialist, etc."
