= National Board of Trial Advocacy =

American legal board certification organization

The National Board of Trial Advocacy (NBTA) is a non-profit board certification organization in the United States which administers eight national board certification programs for attorneys in Civil Trial Law, Criminal Trial Law, Truck Accident Law, Family Trial Law, Civil Practice Advocacy, Social Security Disability Law, Complex Litigation, and Patent Litigation. Each practice area is managed by a specialty program commission of five leading practitioners. To become board-certified, an attorney must meet substantial professional requirements and undergo a peer review process. There are currently close to 2,000 attorneys who are certified by the NBTA. The organization is led by board of directors of noted trial lawyers, law professors, and judges.

Based in Wrentham, Massachusetts, the NBTA's stated mission is to "inform and educate the public concerning legal representation by board-certified specialists" and "recognize and promote excellence in legal advocacy through a national program certifying specialists predicated on high standards of demonstrated competence and integrity." In 2020, NBTA announced the formation of the National Board of Trial Advocacy Foundation.

In addition to its board certification programs, the NBTA annually sponsors the Tournament of Champions, an invitation-only competition that showcases some of the nation's top law students from 16 of the nation's most prestigious schools. Participating schools are invited based on a three-year performance record at the National Trial Competition and the American Association for Justice National Student Trial Advocacy Competition, and performances at prior Tournament of Champions competitions.

NBTA is the largest and oldest of the eight private board-certification organizations for attorneys that the American Bar Association (ABA) accredits through its Standing Committee on Specialization. In addition, many state bar organizations maintain certification programs.

== History ==
In 1973 at the annual Sonnett Lecture at Fordham University School of Law, Chief Justice of the United States Warren Burger stated that "some system of certification for trial advocates is an imperative and long overdue step." Burger stated that the absence of certification programs "has helped bring about the low state of American trial advocacy and a consequent diminution in the quality of our entire system of justice." Burger endorsed board certification of trial lawyers as "basic to a fair system of justice" and, referring to barristers, wrote that the idea had "historic recognition in the common law system." By the time Burger promoted the idea, board certification for physicians was already well-established, with Dr. Derrick T. Vail first proposing certification in his presidential address to the American Academy of Ophthalmology and Otolaryngology in 1908. However, the idea of board certification for trial lawyers was new, and one author describes the reaction of the American legal profession as "startled.".

In response to Burger's call to action, the National Board of Trial Advocacy was founded in 1977 by prominent Connecticut trial attorney Theodore I. Koskoff. Koskoff established the non-profit organization as a group "dedicated to bettering the quality of trial advocacy in our nation's courtrooms and assisting the consumer of legal services in finding experienced and highly qualified trial lawyers."

Initially, NBTA was housed within the offices of the Association of Trial Lawyers of America. In 1987, the Association moved to Suffolk University Law School in Boston, where the law school provided office space. Shortly thereafter, the NBTA became fully self-supporting and set up offices on Tremont Street one block from Government Center. The NBTA remained in Boston until about 2001, when it moved to its current headquarters in Wrentham, Massachusetts.

== Certification ==
Board-certified attorneys undergo thorough screening of credentials. This includes "documentation of their experience, judicial and peer references, an exam, and they must report all disciplinary matters brought before any official body, whether public or private, for scrutiny by the NBTA Standards Committee." An attorney who meets NBTA's stringent requirements and becomes board-certified remains an active member for five years and may apply for re-certification after this time. All board-certified attorneys must meet annual reporting requirements for the NBTA Standards Committee. The NBTA states that "All members have an ongoing responsibility to inform NBTA of any misconduct which may arise during the course of the certification. Good standing is also confirmed on an annual basis by way of a formal annual reporting component of the NBTA certification. All misconduct matters are reviewed and ruled upon in the same fashion as initial certification."

In 1990, Associate Justice John Paul Stevens quoted the Task Force on Lawyer Competence, Report With Findings and Recommendations to The Conference of Chief Justices, Publication No. NCSC-021, pp. 33–34 (May 26, 1982), in Peel v. Atty. Registration & Disciplinary Comm'n, 496 U.S. 91, 95-96 (U.S. 1990) on the quality of the vetting process: "NBTA certification has been described as a 'highly-structured' and 'arduous process that employs a wide range of assessment methods.'" The Minnesota Supreme Court wrote that the "NBTA applies a rigorous and exacting set of standards and examinations on a national scale before certifying a lawyer as a trial specialist." In re Johnson, 341 N.W.2d 282, 283 (Minn. 1983).

== Acceptance ==
By 1973, board certification for physicians was well established. In contrast, when Chief Justice Burger called for board certification of trial lawyers, relying on analogies to medical specialization, aviation specialization and the barrister system, no state in the United States recognized trial lawyers as specialists, and there were no organizations accredited to certify trial lawyers as specialists. Thus, when Chief Justice Burger called for board certification of trial lawyers, one author described the American legal profession as "startled".

Now, there is a greater prevalence of trial advocacy training in law schools and continuing legal education, and attorney board certification is well established and growing. For example, by 1995 there were almost 20,000 board certified lawyers in the United States and by 2009 that number increased to more than 35,000 lawyers. According to the American Bar Association's research in 2008 there were 1,180,386 attorneys licensed to practice law in the United States. Of these the ABA estimates 74% are in private practice; thus approximately 4% of practicing lawyers are currently board certified by states or ABA accredited agencies. Moreover, there are now seven private organizations with ABA-accredited certification programs, 12 state sponsored certification plans and eight state sponsored plans to accredit private certifiers. Today attorney board certification is now available in 49 specialty fields by certifying agencies either operated by a state or one of the ABA accredited private agencies like the NBTA.

Nevertheless, full acceptance of the validity and importance of board certification by all courts and all states has not been achieved. Still, there are NBTA certified attorneys in most if not all states and their numbers are growing.

== See also ==
- American Board of Medical Specialties
- Board certification
- Professional certification
