= Veterinary Hospital Managers Association =

The Veterinary Hospital Managers Association is a professional organisation for veterinarian practice managers.

The association's main objectives are to:

· Develop professional competence by offering relevant educational resources.
· Promote and define veterinary practice management as a profession; promote certification as a standard.
· Provide individuals with a network for professional connection and support.

The American organisation is based in Florida and claims 2500 members.

In 2018 the Veterinary Hospital Managers Association (VHMA) launched an online program to help prepare participants to earn their Certified Veterinary Practice Manager (CVPM) certification.

NOTE - The equivalent UK organisation is called the Veterinary Practice Management Association trading as the Veterinary Management Group
