= International Association of Emergency Managers =

- Abbreviation: IAEM
- Formation: 1952
- Headquarters: Falls Church, VA
- Members: 5,000
- Global Chair: Ellis Stanley
- USA President: Marty Shaub, CEM
- Website: https://www.iaem.org/

The International Association of Emergency Managers (IAEM) is a non-profit organization, dedicated to promoting the profession of emergency management by working with its membership to promote the goals of saving lives and protecting property during emergencies and disasters.

IAEM currently has over 5,000 members in more than 58 countries and is structured in seven Councils around the world.

IAEM promotes its Principles of Emergency Management, and also aims to provide information, networking and professional development for its members.

IAEM was founded in 1952 as the U.S. Civil Defense Council, becoming the National Coordinating Council of Emergency Managers (NCCEM) in 1985, and the International Association of Emergency Managers in 1997.

== Councils ==
IAEM is organized into councils throughout the world. Membership in any of the councils is based on the primary residence of an individual. The councils designated by the association are:

- Asia
- Canada
- Europa
- Latin Americas and the Caribbean
- Oceana
- USA (broken into regions based on the FEMA region designations)
- International (for parts of the world not represented by a council)
- Student

== Certifications ==
The International Association of Emergency Managers (IAEM) created the Associate Emergency Manager (AEM) and the Certified Emergency Manager (CEM) Program to raise and maintain professional standards for emergency managers. In 1988–1989, FEMA granted IAEM funds to produce a report on how to accomplish this. A Professional Standards Advisory Council was formed of subject matter experts representing all aspects of emergency management and related fields. They determined that the best way to implement standards was to define professional benchmarks and provide practitioners with a certification program to document their qualifications.

Criteria	Associate Emergency Manager (AEM)	Certified Emergency Manager (CEM)
Work History	Not Required	Required Three Years of Comprehensive Emergency Management Experience
Experience (Exercise or Actual Disaster)	Not Required	One Full-Scale Exercise, Two Functional Exercises, One Actual Disaster, or One Major Public Event
Professional Contributions	Not Required	Six Required (Membership; Professional Conference; Speaking; Teaching; Service Role; Leadership Role; Special Assignment; Course Development; Audio-Visual; Certification in Emergency Management; Legislative Contact; Award; Conducting Research; or Other)
Education	Not Required	Bacculaureate Degree for USA Applicants (Other countries differ slightly)
References	One minimum (on letterhead from current supervisor); two additional points-of-contact	
Training Hours	100 Hours of Emergency Management; 100 Hours of General Management	
Examination	75% or better, multiple-choice exam	

Certifications at either level must be renewed every fifth year.

The Certified Emergency Manager (CEM) and the Associate Emergency Manager (AEM) are certifications awarded through a peer-reviewed process via emergency management professionals known as the IAEM Certification Commission.

The Certification Commission is composed of volunteer representatives nominated by their respective sponsoring Council Board for each Council except the Student Council, and approved by the USA Board. The nominees must meet the requirements to serve on the Commission including, being a full-time emergency manager, be a current CEM, having successfully recertified at least once, and they must be living and working within the geographic boundaries of the nominating Council. There are 18-30 Commission seats depending on workload/volume of applicants.

The Certification Commission reflects the spectrum of emergency management expertise including all levels of governmental emergency management programs (local, state, tribal, federal) and all environments of practice including but not limited to private sector, military installations, not-for-profit/volunteer-based, campuses and healthcare organizations. This ensures that all candidates are peer-reviewed.

The Certification Executive Committee provides management and oversight of the Certification Commission, and reports to the IAEM-USA Board of Directors.
