= Certified digital radio broadcast specialist =

Certified Digital Radio Broadcast Specialist (DRB) is a specialized title granted in the United States to a previously SBE-certified individual who successfully meets the examination requirements. The certification is regulated by the Society of Broadcast Engineers (SBE), and demonstrates competence in the design and maintenance of digital radio broadcast facilities. The "Certified Digital Radio Broadcast Specialist" title is protected by copyright laws. Individuals who use the title without consent from the Society of Broadcast Engineers could face legal action.

The SBE certifications were created to recognize individuals who practice in career fields which are not regulated by state licensing or Professional Engineering programs. Marine Radio and radar systems still require a Federal Communications Commission (FCC) license apart from an SBE certification. Broadcast Engineering is regulated at the national level and not by individual states.

== See also ==
- List of post-nominal letters
