= Society of Broadcast Engineers =

Professional organization for engineers in broadcast radio and television

- SBE Logo
- Company type: Incentive
- Industry: professional organization
- Founded: 1975
- Headquarters: 39°55′13.5″N 86°9′31.3″W, United States

The Society of Broadcast Engineers (SBE) is a professional organization for engineers in broadcast radio and television. The SBE also offers certification in various radio frequency and video and audio technology areas for its members.

== Background ==
The organization was founded in 1964.

The society elected its first female president, Andrea Cummis, in 2021.

== Certifications ==
Operator Level Certifications

- Certified Radio Operator (CRO)
- Certified Television Operator (CTO)

Broadcast Networking Certifications

- Certified Broadcast Networking Technologist (CBNT)
- Certified Broadcast Networking Engineer (CBNE)

Engineer Level Certifications

- Certified Broadcast Technologist (CBT)
- Certified Audio Engineer (CEA)
- Certified Video Engineer (CEV)
- Certified broadcast radio engineer (CBRE)
- Certified Broadcast Television Engineer (CBTE)
- Certified Senior Broadcast Radio Engineer (CSRE)
- Certified Senior Broadcast Television Engineer (CSTE)
- Certified Professional Broadcast Engineer (CPBE)

Specialist Certifications

- Certified 8-VSB Specialist (8-VSB)
- Certified AM Directional Specialist (AMD)
- Certified Digital Radio Broadcast Specialist (DRB)

Previous Certifications

These certifications are still in use but are no longer issued.

- Certified Senior Broadcast Engineer (CSBE)
- Certified Radio and Television Broadcast Engineer (CBRTE)
- Certified Senior Radio and Television Broadcast Engineer (CSRTE)

== See also ==
- List of post-nominal letters
- Broadcast engineering
