= Certified television operator =

Certification regulated by the Society of Broadcast Engineers

Certified television operator (CTO) is a title granted to an individual that successfully passes the examination requirements of the certification in the United States. The certification is regulated by the Society of Broadcast Engineers (SBE). The certification title is protected by copyright laws. Individuals who use the title without consent from the Society of Broadcast Engineers could face legal action.

The FCC previously required television operators to hold a First Class License, however there is currently no longer any such FCC restriction. The Television Operator Certification exam demonstrates knowledge required for entry-level, non-technical television master control operators. Many television stations now require this certification for employment.

The SBE certifications were created to recognize individuals who practice in career fields that are not regulated by state licensing programs. Television operators are no longer regulated at the national level.

== See also ==
- List of post-nominal letters
