= Certified senior broadcast radio engineer =

Certified Senior Broadcast Radio Engineer (CSRE) is a title granted to an individual in the United States who successfully meets the experience and examination requirements of the certification. The certification is regulated by the Society of Broadcast Engineers (SBE). The CSRE title is protected by copyright laws. Individuals who use the title without consent from the Society of Broadcast Engineers could face legal action.

The SBE certifications were created to recognize individuals who practice in career fields which are not regulated by state licensing or Professional Engineering programs. Marine Radio and radar systems still require a Federal Communications Commission (FCC) license apart from an SBE certification. Broadcast Engineering is regulated at the national level and not by individual states.

== See also ==
- List of post-nominal letters
