= GIS Certification Institute =

Non-profit organization

The GIS Certification Institute (GISCI) is a non-profit 501(c)(6) organization that administers the GIS Professional (GISP) credential certification program and Emerging GIS Professional (GISP-E) for geographic information systems (GIS) professionals.

== Background ==
Formal certification in geographic information systems (GIS) emerged as a topic of professional interest in the early 1990s. In 1993, Nancy Obermeyer published an article titled "Certifying GIS Professionals: Challenges and Alternatives" in the URISA Journal, initiating discussions on the certification of GIS professionals. Responding to member interest, the Urban and Regional Information Systems Association (URISA) established a Certification Committee in 1998, chaired by Obermeyer, to evaluate the potential structure of a certification program.

In 2001, a committee comprising William Huxhold, Karen Kemp, and Lyna Wiggins recommended a portfolio-based certification model. The model proposed assessing candidates based on education, professional experience, contributions to the GIS field, adherence to a professional Geospatial Code of Ethics, and periodic certification renewal. These criteria were aimed at standardizing qualifications for GIS professionals.

URISA piloted this model in the state of Georgia in 2003. Following the pilot and broader consultation within the GIS community, URISA incorporated the GIS Certification Institute (GISCI) as an independent entity in 2002. GISCI officially launched in 2003, initially managed by an interim board composed of URISA leadership. A permanent, independent board of directors was convened in 2004.

From inception, GISCI included participation from several geospatial professional organizations. Founding organizations were URISA, the Association of American Geographers (AAG), the National States Geographic Information Council (NSGIC), and the University Consortium for Geographic Information Science (UCGIS). Each organization was represented on the GISCI board of directors. Lynda Wayne became the first president of GISCI in 2004.

== Certification program ==
The GIS Professional (GISP) certification formally began in 2004. In its first year, 553 individuals were awarded the GISP credential. Several state GIS councils, including those of North Carolina, Oregon, California, Ohio, and New Jersey, recognized or endorsed the GISP certification shortly after its introduction.

From 2004 to 2015, GISCI relied solely on the portfolio, emphasizing verified academic coursework, at least four years of full-time GIS experience, documented contributions to the profession and acceptance of a Code of Ethics. Concern that the system lacked an objective knowledge test led the board to add the Geospatial Core Technical Knowledge Exam in July 2015. The computer-based, four-hour examination was developed through a formal job-analysis study that engaged more than 400 GISPs and was mapped to the U.S. Department of Labor’s Geospatial Technology Competency Model and the GIS&T Body of Knowledge. Since 2015, passing the exam plus meeting the portfolio thresholds has been mandatory for all new applicants, with recertification required every three years.

In 2024, the GISP certification achieved accreditation by the Council of Engineering and Scientific Specialty Boards (CESB).

In March 2025, GISCI introduced PreGISP, an entry-level pathway for recent graduates that awards the GISP-E (Emerging) title to candidates who pass a shortened exam before accumulating full professional experience.
