= National Private Truck Council =

US trade association

- Founded: 1939; 87 years ago
- Type: Trade Association
- Purpose: Trucking industry in the United States
- Location: Arlington, Virginia, United States
- Region served: United States
- Key people: Gary Petty (President and CEO)
- Website: www.nptc.org

The National Private Truck Council (NPTC) is an American trade association which represents private motor carrier fleets in the United States.

Headquartered in Arlington, Virginia, the NPTC is the national trade association representing private motor carrier fleets, corporate or private truck fleets operated by manufacturers, distributors, processors, and retailers. Such fleets are also operated by food, retail, wholesale, construction and service companies.

Private motor carrier fleets account for approximately 82 percent of the medium and heavy-duty trucks registered in the United States, travel approximately 53 percent of all the U.S. miles traveled by medium and heavy-duty trucks, and consist of slightly more than two million vehicles, the largest segment of the trucking industry in the United States.

== History ==
The Association was founded in 1939 as an independent organization initially named the "National Council of Private Motor Truck Operators" after attempts during the 1930s to organize a special private truck conference of the American Trucking Associations (ATA) failed. In 1947, the ATA created a competing organization called "The Private Carrier Conference (PCC)" and it became the largest affiliate of the ATA. In 1953 the National Council of Private Motor Truck Operators changed its name to the "Private Truck Council of America" (PTCA). For over forty years, the PCC and the PTCA operated separately as competitors representing the private fleet trucking industry in Washington, D.C.

In 1987 the PCC disaffiliated with the ATA and renamed itself the "National Private Trucking Association" (NPTA). In 1988 the NPTA and the PTCA voted to merge the two organizations into one. A year later, in 1989, as a result of this merger, the National Private Truck Council was chartered in the Commonwealth of Virginia. Since its inception, NPTC has been an independent national trade association unaffiliated with any other organization in the trucking industry.

In 1992 NPTC formed the Institute for Truck Transportation Management (ITTM), a non-profit charitable and educational corporation operating as a subsidiary of NPTC. The NPTC Institute provides training and certification services for the private fleet industry and oversees the Certified Transportation Professional (CTP) program, the only national certification credential for private fleet managers in the United States.

NPTC represents a broad cross-section of America's Fortune 500 elites such was Wal-Mart, ConAgra, Sysco, Kraft, Linde, General Mills, Nestle, Schwans, Pepsi, Bridgestone, Batesville, Frito-Lay, and hundreds of other manufacturers, distributors, retailers and public service agencies, and small to medium companies of all kinds with private fleets.

NPTC celebrated its combined 75th Anniversary at the Annual Education Management Conference and Exhibition in Cincinnati, April 13–15, 2014.

== Industry profile ==
Private trucking hauls an estimated 4.45 billion tons of freight per year with a value of commodities shipped at US$2.4 trillion. In total, private carriers transport 56 percent of all truck tonnage. They generate about 308 billion ton-miles of transportation having an overall average length of haul of 51 miles. (Source: Census Bureau, 1993-1997 Commodity Flow Survey)

Major commodities hauled by private fleets include petroleum, stone and concrete, wood and paper, beverages, grain mill products, chemicals, food and dairy products, construction materials, and finished goods.
