= International Foundation for Protection Officers =

- Abbreviation: IFPO
- Formation: January 1988
- Type: Non-profit organization
- Headquarters: Florida
- Location: Florida, United States
- Region served: Worldwide
- Website: www.ifpo.org

The International Foundation for Protection Officers (IFPO) is a non-profit organization headquartered in Naples, Florida, United States. The organization was established in January 1988 to help address the training and certification needs of security/protection officers and their supervisors internationally.

== Training and certification ==
The IFPO offers several distance delivered and traditional classroom training programs that can result in certification if completed successfully. The most basic award is the Certified Protection Officer (CPO), and the most advanced is the Certified in Security Supervision and Management (CSSM) course.

Completion of the Security Supervision and Management Program (SSMP) is the first step in the CSSM process. Once the candidate has successfully completed the SSMP, he or she may choose to apply to IFPO to be accepted into the official CSSM certification program.

== Newsletter ==
IFPO publishes a quarterly newsletter. Its circulation, via the IFPO.org web site, includes all IFPO members and candidates enrolled in either their CPO or CSSM programs. The newsletter is designed to keep security professionals current on trends within the security industry. It contains information about physical security, life-safety, as well as personal and property protection.
