= International Association of Accessibility Professionals =

Non-profit organization advocating for accessibility and accessibility professionals

International Association of Accessibility Professionals (IAAP)
- Formation: March 19, 2014
- Headquarters: Atlanta, Georgia, US
- Members: c. 11,000 members
- CEO and President: Christopher M. Lee
- Website: www.accessibilityassociation.org

The International Association of Accessibility Professionals (IAAP) is a nonprofit organization focused on accessibility. It is headquartered in Atlanta, Georgia, United States, and was founded on March 19, 2014, with 38 international organizations from various global industries committed to being founding members. As of 8 July 2026, IAAP has over 10,000 professional members and over 10,000 organizational members representing 130 countries. IAAP became a division of the Global Initiative for Inclusive Information and Communication Technologies (G3ict) in July 2016.
