= Certified Fire Protection Specialist =

The Certified Fire Protection Specialist (CFPS) is a certification provided by the NFPA Certification Department in the U.S.A. The board was formed in 1971 and in 1998 partnered with the National Fire Protection Association (NFPA) to offer the professional certification. The purpose of the certification is to document and recognise an individual's knowledge of fire protection, fire prevention, and fire safety. The certification received ANSI certification in 2006 as an ANSI/ISO/IEC 17024 standard qualification.

Certification is equivalent to a tertiary level degree requiring applicants to have either at least a high school diploma with at least six years of verifiable professional experience in fire loss prevention or at least an associate degree specialising in some aspect of fire loss prevention. Applicants with an associate degree with a relevant specialisation require four years of additional work experience and applicants with a bachelor's degree require at least two years of additional experience.
