= Professional licensure in the United States =

In the United States, the state governments have jurisdiction for issuing most professional licenses to individuals and corporations. In areas that naturally cross states' borders, the national government may be the issuer. Thus the Federal Aviation Administration certifies pilots and other aviation related professionals, such as mechanics and instructors. The Federal Communications Commission certifies persons operating and repairing amateur and many (depending on their power and frequencies) commercial radio transmitters. The Environmental Protection Agency requires that technicians recycling Freon be examined. In many of these areas the federal government approves organizations (and for the FAA designated pilot examiners) to test and certify applicants who meet its standards.

Fields that are regulated and licensed vary among individual states. Among regulated fields are health care professionals (medical doctors, nurses); psychologists; lawyers; teachers; engineers; social workers; occupational therapists; architects; tradesmen (plumbers, electricians); certain service industry workers (bartenders, massage therapists, barbers); and accounting professionals (CPA), among others.

It is now possible to verify an individual state license in all states online, via websites set up by each state government, through different agencies. Some private websites provide links to all such databases, in one location.

== License standards and issues ==
Licensing standards can differ widely from state to state, and the fields and occupations which states require to be licensed may differ widely. Some states may require a written examination for a license, while others may require several years of field experience as a student or intern, or both.

The requirements regarding who must be licensed may include uncommon or strange licenses; for example, four states require licensing for interior designers. The State of Illinois requires four exams to become a nail stylist.

On the other hand, there are states which do not license potentially dangerous professions such as radiologic technicians, despite their delivering ionizing radiation to the general public. This is an example of a less-standardized licensure that is part of the licensing debate. For example, the gold standard in radiologic technician is a JCERT accredited 24-month program, but some states allow for only 6-week programs.

There is often debate about the level and type of regulation needed. For example, Texas' law regarding horse floaters has been debated since at least 2007, as state regulations which prohibit horse floating by anyone who is not a licensed veterinarian, regardless of experience.

Some standards and procedures are the product of state boards working together. For example, the United States Medical Licensing Examination (USMLE) is a medical exam which was created by the Federation of State Medical Boards.

== Immigration law ==
Individuals' ability to receive state or local public benefits, which includes professional and commercial licensure, is dependent on their particular immigration status. Certain non-citizens may be barred from licensure based on their visa type or other immigration considerations.

== See also ==
- Licensure
- Driver's license
- Accreditation
- Law of Agency
