= Lists of post-nominal letters =

Post-nominal letters are letters placed after the name of a person to indicate that the individual holds a position, office, or honour.

An individual may use several different sets of post-nominal letters. Honours are listed first in descending order of precedence, followed by degrees and memberships of learned societies in ascending order.

Some obsolete positions are not listed unless recipients who continue to use the post-nominals even after the order becomes obsolete are still living.

== Morocco ==
- Fellow of the World Amazigh Congress (FWAC)

== Spain ==
- Grandee of Spain (GE)

== See also ==
- Suffix (name)
- Pre-nominal letters
- Orders, decorations, and medals of the Commonwealth realms
- List of religious institutes
