= Professional certification =

Designation earned by a person to assure qualification to perform a job or task

Professional certification, trade certification, or professional designation, often called simply certification or qualification, is a designation earned by a person to assure qualification to perform a job or task. Not all certifications that use post-nominal letters are an acknowledgement of educational achievement, or an agency appointed to safeguard the public interest.

== Overview ==
A certification is a third-party attestation of an individual's level of knowledge or proficiency in a certain industry or profession. They are granted by authorities in the field, such as professional societies and colleges, or by private certificate-granting agencies. Most certifications are time-limited; some expire after a period of time (e.g., the lifetime of a product that requires certification for use), while others can be renewed indefinitely as long as certain requirements are met. Renewal usually requires ongoing education to remain up-to-date on advancements in the field, evidenced by earning the specified number of continuing education credits (CECs), or continuing education units (CEUs), from approved professional development courses.

Certification is different from occupational licensing. In the United States, licenses are typically issued by state agencies, whereas certifications are usually awarded by professional societies or educational institutes. Obtaining a certificate is voluntary in some fields, but in others, certification from a government-accredited agency may be legally required to perform certain jobs or tasks. In other countries, licenses are typically granted by professional societies or universities and require a certificate after about three to five years and so on thereafter. The assessment process for certification may be more comprehensive than that of licensure, though sometimes the assessment process is very similar or even the same, despite differing in terms of legal status.

According to The Guide to National Professional Certification Programs (1997) by Phillip Barnhart, "certifications are portable, since they do not depend on one company's definition of a certain job" and they provide potential employers with "an impartial, third-party endorsement of an individual's professional knowledge and experience".

Many certification programs are affiliated with professional associations, trade organizations, or private vendors interested in raising industry standards. Certification programs are often created or endorsed by professional associations, but are typically completely independent from membership organizations. Certifications are very common in fields such as aviation, construction, technology, environment, and other industrial sectors, as well as healthcare, business, real estate, and finance.

The American National Standards Institute (ANSI) defines the standard for being a certifying agency as meeting the following two requirements:

1. Delivering an assessment based on industry knowledge that is independent from training courses or course providers
2. Granting a time-limited credential to anyone who meets the assessment standards

The Institute for Credentialing Excellence (ICE) is a U.S.-based organization that sets standards for the accreditation of personnel certification and certificate programs based on the Standards for Educational and Psychological Testing, a joint publication of the American Educational Research Association (AERA), the American Psychological Association (APA), and the National Council on Measurement in Education (NCME). Many members of the Association of Test Publishers (ATP) are also certification organizations.

== Categorization ==
There are three general types of certification. Listed in order of development level and portability, they are: corporate (internal), product-specific, and profession-wide.

Corporate, or "internal" certifications, are made by a corporation or low-stakes organization for internal purposes. For example, a corporation might require a one-day training course for all sales personnel, after which they receive a certificate. While this certificate has limited portability – to other corporations, for example – it is the most simple to develop.

Product-specific certifications are more involved, and are intended to be referenced to a product across all applications. This approach is very prevalent in the information technology (IT) industry, where personnel are certified on a version of software or hardware. This type of certification is portable across locations (for example, different corporations that use that software), but not across other products. Another example could be the certifications issued for shipping personnel, which are under international standards even for the recognition of the certification body, under the International Maritime Organization (IMO).

The most general type of certification is profession-wide. Certification in the medical profession is often offered by particular specialties. In order to apply professional standards, increase the level of practice, and protect the public, a professional organization might establish a certification. This is intended to be portable to all places a certified professional might work. Of course, this generalization increases the cost of such a program; the process to establish a legally defensible assessment of an entire profession is very extensive. An example of this is a certified public accountant (CPA), which would not be certified for just one corporation or one piece of accountancy software but for general work in the profession.

== Professional certificates awarded by tertiary education providers ==
Many tertiary education providers grant professional certificates as acknowledgment for the completion of an educational program. The curriculum of a professional certificate is most often in a focused subject matter. Many professional certificates have the same curriculum as master's degrees in the same subject. Many other professional certificates offer the same courses as master's degrees in the same subject, but require the student to take fewer total courses to complete the program. Some professional certificates have a curriculum that more closely resembles a baccalaureate major in the same field. The typical professional certificate program is between 200 and 300 class-hours in size. It is uncommon for a program to be larger or smaller than that. Most professional certificate programs are open enrollment, but some have admissions processes. A few universities put some of their professional certificates into a subclass they refer to as advanced professional certificates.

=== Advanced professional certificate ===
Advanced professional certificates are professional credentials designed to help professionals enhance their job performance and marketability in their respective fields. In many other countries, certificates are qualifications in higher education. In the United States, a certificate may be offered by an institute of higher education. These certificates usually signify that a student has reached a standard of knowledge of a certain vocational subject. Certificate programs can be completed more quickly than associate degrees and often do not have general education requirements.

An advanced professional certificate is a result of an educational process designed for individuals. Certificates are designed for both newcomers to the industry as well as seasoned professionals. Certificates are awarded by an educational program or academic institution. Completion of a certificate program indicates completion of a course or series of courses with a specific concentration that is different from an educational degree program. Course content for an advanced certificate is set forth through a variety of sources i.e. faculty, committee, instructors, and other subject matter experts in a related field. The end goal of an advanced professional certificate is so that professionals may demonstrate knowledge of course content at the end of a set period in time.

== Areas of certification ==
=== Accountancy, auditing and finance ===
There are many professional bodies for accountants and auditors throughout the world; some of them are legally recognized in their jurisdictions. Public accountants are the accountancy and control experts that are legally certified in different jurisdictions to work in public practices, certifying accounts as statutory auditors, eventually selling advice and services to other individuals and businesses. Today, however, many work within private corporations, financial industry, and government bodies.

==== Accounting and external auditing ====
Cf. Accountancy qualifications and regulation

- CPA (Chartered Professional Accountant), the unified accounting designation in Canada conferred by CPA Canada.
- CA or Chartered Accountant conferred by the Institute of Chartered Accountants of India.
- Institute of Chartered Accountants within the Commonwealth e.g. Australia and New Zealand, South Africa, Canada (before merger into CPA). With mutual recognition with each other and with the UK
- ACA, FCA or CA (Chartered Accountant) conferred by Institutes of Chartered Accountants in various territories, namely the United Kingdom of Great Britain and Northern Ireland and the Republic of Ireland.
- ACMA or FCMA (Associate or Fellow Chartered Management Accountant) conferred by the Chartered Institute of Management Accountants (UK)
- Associate or Fellow Chartered Certified Accountant (ACCA or FCCA) conferred by Association of Chartered Certified Accountants (UK)
- AFA or FFA (Associate or Fellow Incorporated Financial Accountant) conferred by the Institute of Financial Accountants (UK)
- AAIA or FAIA (Associate or Fellow International Accountant) conferred by Association of International Accountants
- MIPA or FIPA (Member or Fellow of the Institute of Public Accountants who use the designation "Public Accountant") conferred by the Institute of Public Accountants (Australia)
- CPA (Certified Public Accountant) conferred by State Accountancy Boards in the US, Hong-Kong, Canada ...
- CMA (Certified Management Accountant) conferred by Institute of Certified Management Accountants (ICMA in Australia), Institute of Management Accountants (IMA in US)
- CCC (Chartered Cost Controllers) issued and conferred by the American Academy of Financial Management USA Certifying Board (AAFM)
- CFS (Certified Finance Specialist) conferred by IQN

==== Internal auditing and fraud combat ====
- CIA (Certified Internal Auditor): CCSA, Certification in Control Self Assessment; CGAP, Certified Government Auditing Professional; CRMA, Certification in Risk Management Assurance; QIAL, Qualification in Internal Audit Leadership, conferred by the internationally recognized Institute of Internal Auditors (IIA) headquartered in Lake Mary, Florida, with chapters in many countries
- CFE (Certified Fraud Examiner) conferred by the Association of Certified Fraud Examiners (ACFE) headquartered in Texas with chapters in many countries
- CFF (Certified in Financial Forensics) awarded by the American Institute of CPAs
- CISA (Certified Information Systems Auditor) awarded by the Information Systems Audit and Control Association headquartered in the US with chapters in many countries
- CAMS (Certified Anti-Money Laundering Specialist) offered by Association of Certified Anti-Money Laundering Specialists (ACAMS) and advanced CAMS
- CGSS (Certified Global Sanctions Specialist) conferred by Association of Certified Anti-Money Laundering Specialists (ACAMS)

==== Finance ====
- CFA (Chartered Financial Analyst) conferred by CFA Institute (CFA)
- CIIA (Certified International Investment Analyst) conferred by the Association of Certified International Investment Analysts (ACIIA)

===== Investments =====
- CFA (Chartered Financial Analyst) conferred by CFA Institute (CFA)
- CFOA (Certified Futures and Options Analyst), conferred by the International Council for Derivative Trading (ICFDT)
- CIPM (Certificate in Investment Performance Measurement) conferred by CFA Institute (CFA)
- CIIA (Certified International Investment Analyst) conferred by the Association of Certified International Investment Analysts (ACIIA)
- ASA (Accredited Senior Appraiser), AM (Accredited Member), and CEIV (Certified in Entity and Intangible Valuations) conferred by the American Society of Appraisers
- CBV (Chartered Business Valuator) conferred by the CBV Institute.
- CAIA (Chartered Alternative Investment Analyst) conferred by the CAIA Association
- FRM (Financial Risk Manager) conferred by Global Association of Risk Professionals (GARP)
- PRM (Professional Risk Manager) conferred by Professional Risk Managers' International Association (PRMIA)
- FMVA (Financial Modeling and Valuation Analyst) conferred by Corporate Finance Institute (CFI).
- CQF (Certificate in Quantitative Finance), conferred by the CQF Institute

===== Payroll =====
- CPP (Certified Payroll Professional) and FPC (Fundamental Payroll Specialist) conferred by the American Payroll Association.
- Payroll Compliance Practitioner (PCP) and Certified Payroll Manager (CPM) conferred by the National Payroll Institute

===== Personal finance =====
- CFA (Chartered Financial Analyst) conferred by CFA Institute (CFA)
- CFP (Certified Financial Planner) conferred by Certified Financial Planner Board of Standards and Financial Planning Standards Board
- EA (Enrolled Agent) by the Internal Revenue Service (IRS)

===== Public finance =====
- CCMT (Certified California Municipal Treasurer) conferred by California Municipal Treasurers Association (CMTA)
- CGAP (Certified Government Auditing Professional) conferred by the Institute of Internal Auditors, based on the US Government Auditing Standards (Yellow Book) and additionally on COSO, IIA standards and INTOSAI ISSAI standards recognized worldwide in public finance
- CDFM (Certified Defense Financial Manager) conferred by Society of Defense Financial Management (SDFM) (previously named American Society of Military Comptrollers (ASMC))
- CFO (Certified Financial Officer) conferred by the Carl Vinson Institute of Government of the University of Georgia
- CGFM (Certified Government Financial Manager) conferred by Association of Government Accountants (AGA)
- CGAT (Certified Governmental Accounting Technician), conferred by Government Finance Officers Association of Alabama
- CGFO (Certified Government Finance Officer) conferred by Government Finance Officers Association of Texas (GFOAT)
- CMFO (Certified Municipal Finance Officer) conferred by Government Finance Officers of New Jersey, Rutgers University, and the State of New Jersey
- CMFO (Certified Municipal Finance Officer) conferred by Tennessee Comptroller of the Treasury and the Municipal Technical Advisory Service
- CPFO (Certified Public Finance Officer) conferred by Government Finance Officers Association
- CPFA (Certified Public Finance Administrator) conferred by Association of Public Treasurers of the United States and Canada (APTUSC)

=== Architecture ===
- AIA (Member, American Institute of Architects) conferred by American Institute of Architects
- FAIA (Fellow, American Institute of Architects) conferred by American Institute of Architects
- RA (Registered Architect) conferred by National Council of Architecture Registration Boards
- NCARB (Certified) issued by National Council of Architecture Registration Boards – this allows for state-state reciprocity.

=== Archival science, information privacy, and records management ===
- CA (Certified Archivist), conferred by Academy of Certified Archivists
- CIPM (Certified Information Privacy Manager) conferred by International Association of Privacy Professionals
- CIPP (Certified Information Privacy Professional) conferred by International Association of Privacy Professionals
- CIPT (Certified Information Privacy Technologist) conferred by International Association of Privacy Professionals
- CRA (Certified Records Analyst) conferred by Institute of Certified Records Managers
- CRM (Certified Records Manager) conferred by Institute of Certified Records Managers
- IGP (Information Governance Professional) conferred by ARMA International

=== Aviation ===
Aviators are certified through theoretical and in-flight examinations. Requirements for certifications are quite equal in most countries and are regulated by each National Aviation Authority. The existing certificates or pilot licenses are:

- SPL (Sport Pilot License) conferred by the FAA (Federal Aviation Administration)
- PPL (Private Pilot License) conferred by the FAA (Federal Aviation Administration) or JAA (Joint Aviation Authorities)
- CPL (Commercial Pilot Licence) conferred by the FAA (Federal Aviation Administration) or JAA (Joint Aviation Authorities)
- ATP (Airline Transport Pilot) conferred by the FAA (Federal Aviation Administration) or JAA (Joint Aviation Authorities)

Licensing in these categories require not only examinations but also a minimum number of flight hours. All categories are available for Fixed-Wing Aircraft (airplanes) and Rotatory-Wing Aircraft (helicopters). Within each category, aviators may also obtain certifications in:

- Instrument Flight Rules (IFR)
- Multi-engine aircraft
- Turbojet Engines
- Jet Engines
- Experimental aircraft
- Amphibious aircraft
- Seaplanes

Usually, aviators must be certified also in their log books for the type and model of aircraft they are allowed to fly. Currency checks as well as regular medical check-ups with a frequency of 6 months, 12 months, or 36 months, depending on the type of flying permitted, are obligatory. An aviator can fly only if holding:

- A valid pilot license
- A valid medical certificate
- Valid certifications for the type of aircraft and type of flight.

In Europe, the ANSP, ATCO & ANSP technicians are certified according to EUROCONTROL Safety Regulatory Requirement (ESARRs) (according to EU regulation 2096/2005 "Common Requirements").

=== Biomedical ===
- BMD (Biomedical Electronics Technician) conferred by Electronics Technicians Association
- BIET (Biomedical Imaging Electronics Technician) conferred by Electronics Technicians Association

=== Communications ===
In the United States, several communications certifications are conferred by the Electronics Technicians Association.

=== Computer technology ===
Certification is often used in the professions of software engineering and information technology.

- CITP (Chartered IT Professional) conferred by British Computer Society, The Institution of Engineering and Technology and by other professional engineering institutions in the UK and commonwealth

=== Dance ===
Conferred by the International Dance Council CID at UNESCO, the International Certification of Dance Studies is awarded to students who have completed 150 hours of classes in a specific form of dance for Level 1. Another 150 hours are required for Level 2 and so on till Level 10. This is the only international certification for dance since the International Dance Council CID is the official body for all forms of dance; it is usually given in addition to local or national certificates, that is why it is colloquially called "the dancer's passport". Students cannot apply for this certification directly – they have to ask their school to apply on their behalf. This certification is awarded free of charge, there is no cost other than membership fees.

International Dance Council CID at UNESCO administers the International Certification of Dance Studies.

=== Data management ===
- Business Intelligence and Data Analyst (BIDA) by Corporate Finance Institute (CFI).
- Certified Data Management Professional (CDMP) by DAMA International.

=== Electronics ===
In the United States, several electronics certifications are provided by the Electronics Technicians Association.

=== Emergency management ===
The Federal Emergency Management Agency's EMI offers credentials and training opportunities for United States citizens. Students do not have to be employed by FEMA or be federal employees for some of the programs.

=== Engineering ===
Professional engineering is any act of planning, designing, composing, measuring, evaluating, inspecting, advising, reporting, directing or supervising, or managing any of the foregoing, that requires the application of engineering principles and that concerns the safeguarding of life, health, property, economic interests, the public interest or the environment.

- P.Eng. (Professional Engineer), conferred by provincial licensing bodies in Canada.
- Ir. or P.Eng. (Professional Engineer), conferred by Board of Engineers Malaysia (BEM) in Malaysia.
- PE (Professional Engineer), conferred by Pakistan Engineering Council (PEC) and state licensing bodies in the United States.
- PE (Power Engineer), conferred by provincial safety authorities in Canada.
- EUR ING (European Engineer), conferred by the European Federation of National Engineering Associations (FEANI).
- C.Eng. (Chartered Engineer), conferred by professional engineering institutions in the UK and commonwealth.
- SMIEEE (Senior member of the IEEE), a professional designation throughout all of the United States.
- CET (certified engineering technologist) or AScT (applied science technologist), conferred by provincial licensing bodies in Canada.
- SPE Society of Petroleum Engineers Certificate Is a program whereby it certifies the technical knowledge of petroleum engineers. The certification is granted based on an examination in conjunction with experience of the applicant.

=== Event planning ===
Event planning includes budgeting, scheduling, site selection, acquiring necessary permits, coordinating transportation and parking, arranging for speakers or entertainers, arranging decor, event security, catering, coordinating with third-party vendors, and emergency plans.

=== Warehousing management ===
A warehouse management system (WMS) is a part of the supply chain and primarily aims to control the movement and storage of materials within a warehouse and process the associated transactions, including shipping, receiving, putaway and picking. The systems also direct and optimize stock putaway based on real-time information about the status of bin utilization. A WMS monitors the progress of products through the warehouse. It involves the physical warehouse infrastructure, tracking systems, and communication between product stations.

More precisely, warehouse management involves the receipt, storage and movement of goods, (normally finished goods), to intermediate storage locations or to a final customer. In the multi-echelon model for distribution, there may be multiple levels of warehouses. This includes a central warehouse, a regional warehouses (serviced by the central warehouse) and potentially retail warehouses (serviced by the regional warehouses).

=== Environment ===
- CEnvP – Certified Environmental Practitioner of Australia and New Zealand (CEnvP)

=== Environmental health ===
- CPHI(C) – Certified Public Health Inspector (Canada)

=== Explosive atmospheres ===
IECEx covers the specialized field of explosion protection associated with the use of equipment in areas where flammable gases, liquids and combustible dusts may be present. This system provides the assurance that equipment is manufactured to meet safety standards, and that services such as installation, repair and overhaul also comply with IEC International Standards on 60079 series. The UNECE (United Nations Economic Commission for Europe), cited IECEx as one example of a practice model for the verification of conformity to IEC Standards, for European smaller countries with no certification schemes for such equipment. It published a "Common Regulatory Framework" as a suggestion for those countries implementing a certification program for the explosive atmospheres' segment.

=== Fiber optics and data cabling ===
- DCI (Data Cabling Installer) conferred by Electronics Technicians Association
- FOI (Fiber Optics Installer) conferred by Electronics Technicians Association
- FOT (Fiber Optics Technician) conferred by Electronics Technicians Association
- FOT-OSP (Fiber Optics Technician-Outside Plant) conferred by Electronics Technicians Association
- FOD (Fiber Optics Designer) conferred by Electronics Technicians Association
- TTT (Termination and Testing Technician) conferred by Electronics Technicians Association

=== Genealogy ===
- CG (Certified Genealogist) conferred by the Board for Certification of Genealogists (BCG).
- CGL (Certified Genealogical Lecturer) conferred by the Board for Certification of Genealogists (BCG).

=== Health leadership ===
- CHE (Certified Health Executive) conferred by the Canadian College of Health Leaders (CCHL)

=== Hospitality and tourism ===
- CHA (Certified Hotel Administrator) conferred by American Hotel & Lodging Association
- CMP (Certified Meeting Professional) conferred by Convention Industry Council
- CEM (Certified in Exhibition Management) conferred by International Association of Exhibitions and Events

=== Insurance and risk management ===
In the United States, insurance professionals are licensed separately by each state. Many individuals seek one or more certifications to distinguish themselves from their peers.

- American College of Financial Services:
  - Chartered Life Underwriter (CLU)
  - Chartered financial consultant (ChFC)
- Academy of Professional Certification (APC) NGO:
  - Certified Professional - Enterprise Risk Management (CP-ERM)
  - ISO31000 Lead Risk Manager & Auditor (ISO 31000 LRMA )
- American Institute For Chartered Property Casualty Underwriters (The Institutes):
  - Chartered Property Casualty Underwriter (CPCU®)
  - Associate in Risk Management (ARM)
- National Alliance for Insurance Education & Research administers the Certified Insurance Counselor (CIC)
- Professional Liability Underwriting Society (PLUS) administers Registered Professional Liability Underwriter (RPLU).

=== Language education ===
TESOL is a large field of employment with widely varying degrees of regulation. Most provision worldwide is through the state school system of each individual country, and as such, the instructors tend to be trained primary- or secondary school teachers who are native speakers of the language of their pupils, and not of English. Though native speakers of English have been working in non-English speaking countries in this capacity for years, it was not until the last twenty-five years or so that there was any widespread focus on training particularly for this field. Previously, workers in this sort of job were people engaging in backpacker tourism hoping to earn some extra travel money or well-educated professionals in other fields volunteering, or retired people. These sorts of people are certainly still to be found, but there are many who consider TESOL their main profession.

One of the problems facing these full-time teachers is the absence of an international governing body for the certification or licensure of English language teachers. However, Cambridge University and its subsidiary body UCLES are pioneers in trying to get some degree of accountability and quality control to consumers of English courses, through their CELTA and DELTA programs. Trinity College London has equivalent programs, the CertTESOL and the LTCL DipTESOL. They offer initial certificates in teaching, in which candidates are trained in language awareness and classroom techniques, and given a chance to practice teaching, after which feedback is reported. Both institutions have as a follow-up a professional diploma, usually taken after a year or two in the field. Although the initial certificate is available to anyone with a high school education, the diploma is meant to be a post-graduate qualification and can in fact be incorporated into a master's degree program.

=== Legal affairs ===
An increasing number of attorneys are choosing to be recognized as having special expertise in certain fields of law. According to the American Bar Association, a lawyer who is a certified specialist has been recognized by an independent professional certifying organization as having an enhanced level of skill and expertise, as well as substantial involvement in an established legal specialty. These organizations require a lawyer to demonstrate special training, experience and knowledge to ensure that the lawyer's recognition is meaningful and reliable. Lawyer conduct with regard to specialty certification is regulated by the states.

Legal administrators vary in their day-to-day responsibilities and job requirements. The Association of Legal Administrators (ALA) is the credentialing body of the Certified Legal Manager (CLM) certification program. CLMs are recognized as administrators who have passed a comprehensive examination and have met other eligibility requirements.:

=== Logistics and transport ===
Logistician is the profession in the logistics and transport sectors, including sea, air, land and rail modes. Professional qualification for logisticians usually carries post-nominal letters.

Certification granting bodies include, but are not limited to, Institute for Supply Management (ISM), Association for Operations Management (APICS), Chartered Institute of Logistics and Transport (CILT), International Society of Logistics (SOLE), Canadian Institute of Traffic and Transportation (CITT), and Allied Council for Commerce and Logistics (ACCL).

=== Management Consulting ===
Management consulting is the practice of providing consulting services to organizations to improve their performance or in any way to assist in achieving any sort of organizational objectives.

The profession's primary certification is the "Certified Management Consultant" (CMC) designation.

Certification granting bodies are the approximately 50 Institutes of Management Consulting belonging to the International Council of Management Consulting Institutes (ICMCI).

=== Marketing ===
- CME (Certified Marketing Executive), conferred by Sales & Marketing Executives International, Inc..

=== Ministers ===
Churches have their own process of who may use various religious titles. Protestant churches typically require a Masters of Divinity, accreditation by the denomination and ordination by the local church in order for a minister to become a "Reverend". Those qualifications may or may not also give government authorization to solemnize marriages.

=== Medicine ===
Board certification is the process by which a physician in the United States documents by written, practical or computer based testing, illustrating a mastery of knowledge and skills that define a particular area of medical specialization. The American Board of Medical Specialties, a not-for-profit organization, assists 24 approved medical specialty boards in the development and use of standards in the ongoing evaluation and certification of physicians.

Medical specialty certification in the United States is a voluntary process. While medical licensure sets the minimum competency requirements to diagnose and treat patients, it is not specialty specific. Board certification demonstrates a physician's exceptional expertise in a particular specialty or sub-specialty of medical practice.

Patients, physicians, health care providers, insurers and quality organizations regard certification as an important measure of a physician's knowledge, experience and skills to provide quality health care within a given specialty.

Other professional certifications include certifications such as medical licenses, Membership of the Royal College of Physicians, Fellowship of the Royal College of Physicians and Surgeons of Canada, nursing board certification, diplomas in social work. The Commission for Certification in Geriatric Pharmacy certifies pharmacists that are knowledgeable about principles of geriatric pharmacotherapy and the provision of pharmaceutical care to the elderly. Additional certifying bodies relating to the medical field include:

- Royal Australian and New Zealand College of Radiologists
- American College of Emergency Physicians
- Royal Australasian College of Physicians
- Fellowship of the Royal College of Surgeons
- Membership of the College of Emergency Medicine
- Joint Commission on Allied Health Personnel in Ophthalmology
- American Registry for Diagnostic Medical Sonography

=== Peer support ===
NCPRP stands for "National Certified Peer Recovery Professional", and the NCPRP credential and exam were developed in collaboration with the International Certification Board of Recovery Professionals (ICBRP) and is currently being administered by PARfessionals.

PARfessionals is a professional organization and all of the available courses are professional development and pre-certification courses.

The NCPRP credential and exam focus primarily on the concept of peer recovery through mental health and addiction recovery. It has the main purpose of training student-candidates on how to become peer recovery professionals who can provide guidance, knowledge or assistance for individuals who have had similar experiences.

Each student-candidate must complete several key steps which include initial registration; the pre-certification review course; and all applicable sections of the official application in order to become eligible to complete the final step, which is the NCPRP certification exam.

The NCPRP credential is obtained once a participant successfully passes the NCPRP certification exam by the second attempt and is valid for five years.

=== Physical asset management ===
- MMP – Maintenance Management Professional

=== Project management ===
Organizations that offer various certifications include:

- American Academy of Project Management
- Project Management Institute
- Stanford University through the Stanford Advanced Project Management Certificate Program
- Association for Project Management

=== Public relations ===
In the US, the Universal Accreditation Board, an organization composed of the Public Relations Society of America, the Agricultural Relations Council, the National School Public Relations Association, the Religious Communicators Council and other public relations professional societies, administers the Accreditation in Public Relations (APR), a voluntary certification program for public relations practitioners.

=== Real estate management ===
The Building Owners and Managers Association and the International Facility Management Association offer professional certifications for the operation and management of commercial properties.

=== Renewable energy ===
- PVIP (PV Installation Professional) conferred by North American Board of Certified Energy Practitioners
- PVDS (PV Design Specialist) conferred by North American Board of Certified Energy Practitioners
- PVIS (PV Installation Specialist) conferred by North American Board of Certified Energy Practitioners
- PVCMS (PV Commissioning & Maintenance Specialist) conferred by North American Board of Certified Energy Practitioners
- PVSI (PV System Inspector) conferred by North American Board of Certified Energy Practitioners
- PVTS (PV Technical Sales) conferred by North American Board of Certified Energy Practitioners
- SHI (Solar Heating Installer) conferred by North American Board of Certified Energy Practitioners
- SHSI (Solar Heating System Inspector conferred by North American Board of Certified Energy Practitioners
- EVT (Electronic Vehicle Technician) conferred by Electronics Technicians Association
- PVI (Photovoltaic Installer) conferred by Electronics Technicians Association
- SWI (Small Wind Installer) conferred by Electronics Technicians Association

=== Safety and Occupational Hygiene ===
- Certified Safety Professional offered by the Board of Certified Safety Professionals
- Certified Industrial Hygienist

=== Sales ===
Organizations offering certification include:

- Sales & Marketing Executives International
- Canadian Professional Sales Association

=== Security ===
- ASIS International administers the Certified Protection Professional – Board-Certified in Security Management (CPP)
- ASIS International administers the Physical Security Professional, Board-Certified (PSP)
- ASIS International administers the Professional Certified Investigator, Board-Certified (PCI)
- Association of Certified Fraud Examiners administers the Certified Fraud Examiner (CFE)
- International Foundation of Protection Officers administers the Certified Protection Officer (CPO)
- Society of Payment Security Professionals (SPSP) administers the Certified Payment-Card Industry Security Manager
- Certified Information Systems Security Professional (CISSP) from ISC2.org
- National Sheriffs' Association administers the Certified Homeland Protection Professional (CHPP) Certification
- Associated Locksmiths of America administers the Registered Locksmith (RL) Certification
- Associated Locksmiths of America administers the Certified Registered Locksmith (CRL) Certification
- Associated Locksmiths of America administers the Certified Professional Locksmith (CPL) Certification
- Associated Locksmiths of America administers the Certified Master Locksmith (CML) Certification
- Associated Locksmiths of America administers the Certified Professional Safe Technician (CPS) Certification
- Associated Locksmiths of America administers the Certified Master Safe Technician (CMST) Certification
- Security Industry Association administers the Certified Security Project Manager (CSPM) Certification
- The Pennsylvania Security Organization administers the Certified Protection Executive (CPE) and Certified Protection Specialist (CPS) certifications.
- ISACA administers the Certified Information Systems Auditor (CISA) certification
- ISACA administers the Certified Information Security Manager (CISM) certification
- CompTIA administers the CompTIA Security+ certification
- EC-Council administers the Certified Ethical Hacker (CEH) certification
- GIAC administers the GIAC Security Essentials Certification (GSEC)
- ISC2 administers the Systems Security Certified Practitioner (SSCP) certification

== Other applications ==
- The American Academy of Environmental Engineers board certifies licensed environmental engineers (Board Certified Environmental Engineer—BCEE) and unlicensed environmental engineering practitioners (Board Certified Environmental Engineering Member—BCEEM) for those with a degree in engineering and at least 8 years of practice and responsible charge in environmental engineering.
- The American Institute of Floral Designers offers two levels of certification for individuals in the field of professional floral design. Certified Floral Designer (CFD) and accredited membership (AIFD) are both designed to establish a gold standard in professional floral design while ensuring the certified individual maintains that standard through continued education credits. While many state-level floral associations also offer state-level floral design certification known as Master Florist certification, AIFD certification is the highest level of professional floral design awarded in the United States.
- The Canadian National Association of Infrared Imaging Technologists (AIIT) awards the IIT designation to infrared thermographers who meet the training standards regulated by the association. AIIT aims to ensure service delivery standards and public trust through regulating training standards, codes of conduct and continuing education.
- The Society for Technical Communication (STC) is planning to create a certification program for technical writers in 2011.
- The International Society of Arboriculture (ISA) is the International body who administers ANSI-accredited certification programs for arborists and tree care specialists. Certifications vary from Tree Worker to Certified Arborist to Master Arborist.

== Criticisms ==
Political commentators have criticized professional or occupational licensing, especially medical and legal licensing, for restricting the supply of services and therefore making them more expensive, often putting them out of reach of the poor.

== See also ==
- Academic inflation
- European professional qualification directives
- Homologation
- Institute for Certification of Computing Professionals
- Occupational licensing
- Product certification
- Professional certification (business)
- Professional degree
- Tech certificate
