= Dan Shugar =

American business executive

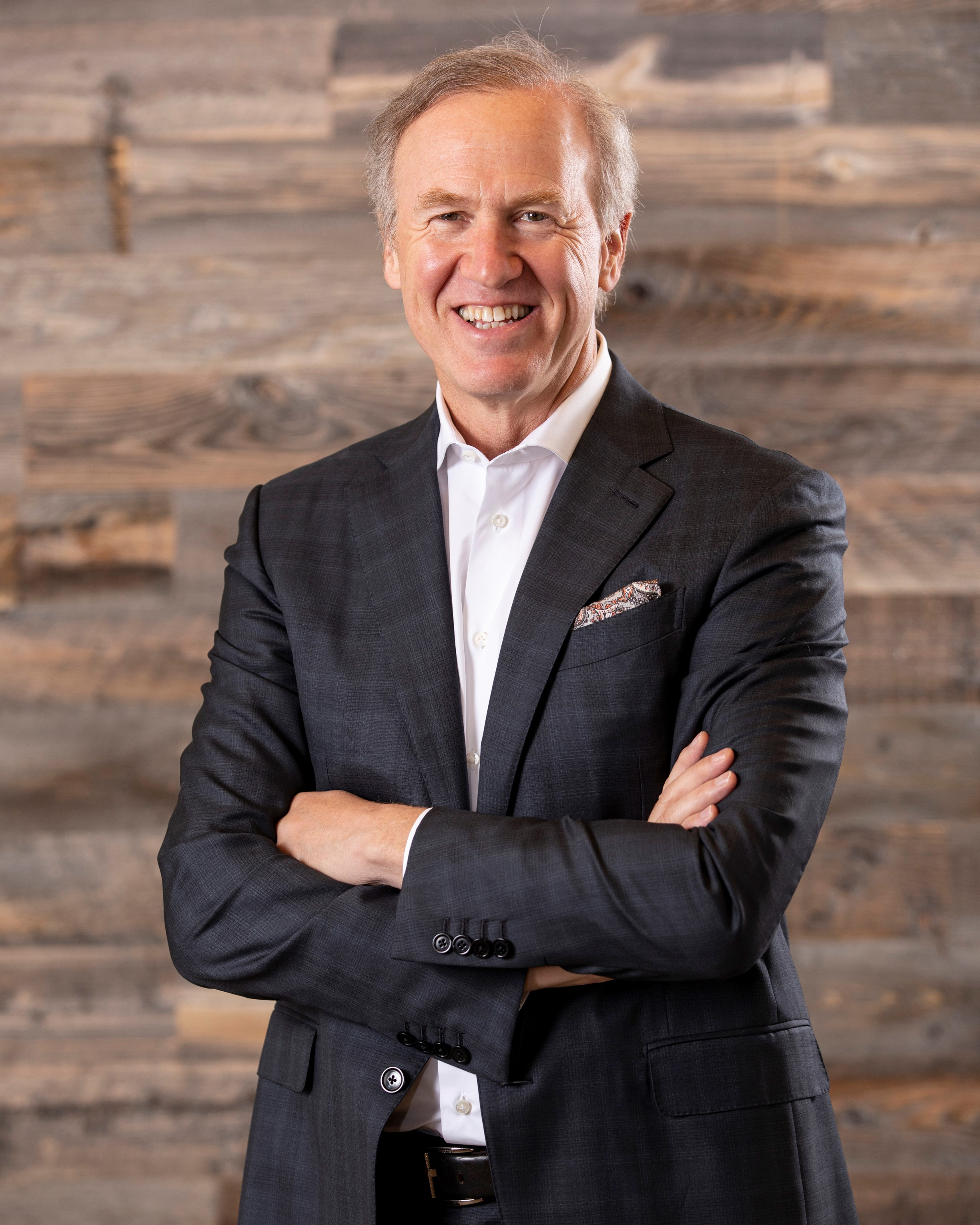
- Education: Rensselaer Polytechnic Institute (BSc); Golden Gate University (MBA)
- Occupations: Renewable energy entrepreneur, business executive
- Years active: 1987–present
- Title: Co-founder and CEO of Nextpower (formerly Nextracker)
- Website: nextpower.com

Dan Shugar is an American business executive and renewable energy pioneer. He is the co-founder and CEO of Nextpower (formerly Nextracker)

== Early life and education ==
Shugar grew up in New Jersey. He graduated from Rensselaer Polytechnic Institute with a Bachelor of Science degree in electrical engineering. He later received an MBA from Golden Gate University.

== Career ==
Shugar began his career in the late 1980s in the research and development department at Pacific Gas and Electric Company.

In 1996, Shugar joined Tom Dinwoodie, who invented a lightweight solar roof system, as co-founder of PowerLight Corporation.

Shugar and Dinwoodie worked together on existing intellectual property to commercialize single-axis solar trackers and received certification for their use in the U.S. and Europe. Other innovations included a "solar inverter in a container" for its use at solar power plants, an integrated residential solar roof system and carport solutions.

In 2007, SunPower Corp. purchased PowerLight for $332 million. Shugar was later named president of SunPower. Under Shugar's leadership, PowerLight and SunPower grew from less than $1 million to $830 million in annual revenues, with Shugar overseeing the completion of more than 500 commercial, industrial, and utility solar projects worldwide.

In 2010, Shugar became CEO of a solar panel startup named Solaria.

=== At Nextpower (formerly Nextracker) ===
In 2013, Shugar co-founded Nextracker while working at Solaria to develop a new generation of solar-tracking systems for utility-scale solar power plants. The following year, the company was spun off from Solaria after which Shugar became its CEO.

In 2016, Shugar orchestrated the company's acquisition of BrightBox Technologies, Inc., which develops predictive modeling software and machine-learning technologies.

After Covid, Shugar led efforts to reshore solar tracker manufacturing to the U.S. following disruption of global supply chains. In December 2024, the company shipped the first U.S.-manufactured solar trackers with 100% domestic content.

Under Shugar, the company made its debut on the Nasdaq Global Select Market in 2023. As of March 31, 2024, the company had shipped solar tracking systems for more than 100 gigawatts (GW) of capacity to 40 countries across six continents.

After orchestrating multiple acquisitions and expansions, Shugar led the company in rebranding as Nextpower on November 12, 2025, reflecting its transformation from a leader in solar tracking to a global supplier of fully integrated energy technology solutions for utility-scale and distributed generation solar power plants.

== Awards and recognition ==
- 2023 S&P Platts Global Energy Awards – Shugar received the Chief Trailblazer of the Year award for energy industry leadership and innovation.
- 2023 Hoyt Clarke Hottel Award – he received this annual award from the American Solar Energy Society for his contributions to the energy sector.
