= PARfessionals =

Addiction research firm

PARfessionals is a private research development firm for Peer Support and Recovery Providers in Addictions.

== Background ==
The company was founded in 2011 by Jorea McNamee She self-published the book “Getting Ahead: An Ex-Offenders Guide to Getting Ahead in Today’s Society”, where she encourages ex-offenders to participate in clinical research trials. She is mentioned in Dr. Jon Marc Taylor's book “Prisoners' Guerrilla Handbook to Correspondence Programs in the United States and Canada,” published by Prison Legal News in 2008.

Jorea McNamee was taking classes to become a Clinical Research Coordinator (CRC) before she decided to transition into the addiction industry to become an Addictions Counselor in 2009. Around that time, she received her CCJP – a status from the Texas Certification Board of Addiction Professionals (TCBAP) and has been granted numerous credentials from the board, including the Peer Recovery Specialist (PRS), Peer Mentor/Peer Recovery Coach (PM-PRC) and the Associate Prevention Specialist (APS) credentials, but has since retired those credentials.

Jorea McNamee earned a B.S. degree in management in 2009 and has completed degree requirements in order to graduate with a M.A. in Criminal Justice from the American (Military) Public University System. She has also earned a graduate certificate in Applied Forensic Psychology Services from The Chicago School of Professional Psychology. In addition, she has obtained certificates in mental health, nonprofit management, applied forensic psychology services, basic clinic research, family and business mediation, substance abuse, as well as emergency management. In addition, she has received training throughout the years in various important topics such as rape/domestic violence crisis intervention, hospice, and health unit coordination from various organizations and colleges including Parkland Health & Hospital System, Brookhaven College, Lakewood College, Center for Degree Studies, Northwestern University Feinberg School of Medicine, Thomas Edison State College, University of Texas at Arlington-Continuing Education Division, and Richland College.

She is a former member of the American Association on Intellectual and Developmental Disabilities, NAADAC- The Association of Addiction Professionals, National Alliance for Direct Support Professionals, National Association of Health Unit Coordinators, Psychiatric Rehabilitation Association and the International Association for Correctional and Forensic Psychology.

== History ==
In 2011, the word " PARfessionals" was created by the company's founder. In 2012, PARfessionals decided to develop the first peer-based online recovery coach training program designed for those interested in mentoring individuals into and through long-term recovery from co-occurring disorders and other addictions and addictive behaviors.

In 2013, PARfessionals developed the first Peer Recovery/Addiction Recovery Coach Study Guide, a free Peer Recovery/Addiction Recovery Coach Curriculum Guide, a free Peer Recovery/Addiction Recovery Coach Practicum Guide and an online Peer Recovery/Addiction Recovery Coach Train the Trainers course. Additionally, PARfessionals' founder and several family members applied for an ACE college credit review with the American Council On Education and then to Distance Education Accreditation Council (DEAC) in August 2015. After being rejected by DEAC, the founder contacted Charter State Oak College who in November 2015 about their program being recognized for college credit under their college assessment program.

PARfessionals designed a Peer Recovery Facilitator Development e-Course in an effort to support the ongoing efforts of social service agencies, foundations, government agencies, and employers worldwide. This course would also work towards the development of community re-entry programs for inmates and workforce development skills for disadvantaged individuals such as ex-offenders, disabled individuals, low-income communities and minorities.

It was developed in collaboration with post-secondary educators and coaching experts for a diverse population with an array of learning skills who may be teaching, employing or supporting those who may be inmates, ex-offenders, mental health consumers, recovering addicts and individuals with intellectual and developmental disabilities. It provides adult-oriented learning strategies for a diverse group of individuals with different learning abilities.

The online Peer Recovery Facilitator Development e-Course was officially approved in 2014, by the Association for Addiction Professionals, also known as NAADAC.

In 2014, PARfessionals developed the first free Peer Recovery Support Specialist/Addiction Recovery Coach classroom curriculum kits in addition to a home study course, a correctional correspondence course for inmates, research journal, universal Code of Ethics and an international certification board. Additionally, PARfessionals' founder created an in-house private virtual research institute, the Powell Leary Jacobs (PLJ) Multicultural Institute for Transformation Research in Addictions, to self-fund resources on Peer Recovery and Prevention. It was internally closed in 2014.

From 2013 to 2014, PARfessionals and its parent organization, the SJM Family Foundation (which closed in January 2015 through the Texas Secretary of State) provided seven scholarships for eligible candidates from the general public who were devoted to seeking training for addiction treatment and peer recovery services.

Kelley-Hardison also established the International Certification Board of Recovery Professionals (ICBRP), the first ever, peer-run certification board created for peer recovery professionals in the world. The ICBRP's mission was to be an independent, informal ad-hoc advisory board that provides guidance and accountability for the National Certified Peer Recovery Professionals (NCPRP) credentialing program. However, it was later dissolved (through the Georgia Secretary of State in March 2015 ), and merged into PARfessionals' private corporate structure.

In Spring 2017, The PARfessionals' Cultural Intelligence in Addictions course supplemental student workbook was included in the German National Library.

As of August 2018, PARfessionals is a private product design and consulting firm. The founder, Jorea Kelley-Hardison is a nationally certified psychiatric technician and social impact artist that has successfully worked with dozens of licensed professional clinicians and medical staff worldwide, including professionals from Harvard Medical School and the National Institute of Health. to create 45+ PARfessionals' branded resources, including Peer Recovery Practicum Guide, a Peer Recovery Pre-Certification Review e-Course. a Peer Recovery Supervision Training Course, and Peer Recovery classroom curriculum kits.

In order to accomplish the company's goals, Kelley-Hardison, along with members of the AR SJM Family, hired and privately paid independent contractors and freelancers, also Ms. Hardison and several of her family members working as volunteers using their own money, and collaborating with a group of qualified contracted experts from across the world that had acquired degrees, held additional credentials and had significant work experience in their own respective fields.

== The Definition of “Peer Recovery” ==
The term peer recovery can be first defined through PARfessionals as “the process of giving and receiving encouragement and assistance to achieve long-term recovery. Peers offer emotional support, share knowledge, teaches skills, provide practical assistance, and connect people with resources, opportunities, communities of support, and other people”.

The Association for Addiction Professionals (NAADAC) provides a different definition of recovery. According to William White, MA, “recovery is the experience… through which individuals, families, and communities impacted by severe alcohol and other drug (AOD) problems utilize internal and external resources to voluntarily resolve these problems, heal the wounds inflicted by AOD related problems, actively manage their continued vulnerability to such problems, and develop a healthy, productive, and meaningful life”.

The International Certification & Reciprocity Consortium (IC&RC) states that “peer recovery is experiencing rapid growth, whether it is provided by a peer recovery coach, peer recovery support specialist, peer navigator, patient navigators, public health learning navigators, behavorial health navigator or peer recovery mentor. Peer support services - advocating, mentoring, educating, and navigating systems – are becoming an important component in recovery oriented systems of care”.

IC&RC credentials and examinations, including Peer Recovery are administered exclusively by various certification and licensing boards in the United States and the world.

The Substance Abuse and Mental Health Services Administration (SAMHSA) is the agency within the U.S. Department of Health and Human Services that leads public health efforts to advance the behavioral health of the nation. SAMHSA's mission is to reduce the impact of substance abuse and mental illness on America's communities.

SAMHSA states that:

Peer support services are delivered by individuals who have common life experiences with the people they are serving. People with mental and/or substance use disorders have a unique capacity to help each other based on a shared affiliation and a deep understanding of this experience. In self-help and mutual support, people offer this support, strength, and hope to their peers, which allows for personal growth, wellness promotion, and recovery.

Research has shown that peer support facilitates recovery and reduces health care costs. Peers also provide assistance that promotes a sense of belonging within the community. The ability to contribute to and enjoy one’s community is key to recovery and well-being. Another critical component that peers provide is the development of self-efficacy through role modeling and assisting peers with ongoing recovery through mastery of experiences and finding meaning, purpose, and social connections in their lives."

== Peer Recovery Academics Program ==
In 2012, PARfessionals developed the first globally recognized online training program for peer recovery professionals. As of September 2015, PARfessionals offers an online distance learning pre-certification training course, a home study correspondence course and an inmate correspondence course for student-candidates to study at their own pace for global certification in peer recovery. The curriculum is based on proven research in order to make it the most specialized and comprehensive training program for a new generation of Peer Recovery Professionals for a variety of settings.

Students worldwide have completed the training and shared their satisfaction with PARfessionals training program.

PARfessionals developed its own examination assessment test.

In Fall 2016, PARfessionals' founder worked with qualified and licensed clinicians to create and sponsor the world's first college level peer recovery training course and lifetime credential for the behavioral healthcare workforce, which was submitted and reviewed through the Connecticut Credit Assessment Program and The Consortium for the Assessment of College Equivalence of Charter State College in Fall 2016. In 2021, PARfessionals decided to focus strictly on peer recovery for justice-involved individuals. In 2023, through independent study, PARfessionals revised their Forensic/ReEntry Peer Recovery program for inmates/ex-offenders.

== Global Health Impact ==
Deloitte provides an annual look at the topics, trends, and issues impacting the global health care sector. According to its 2017 Global Healthcare Sector Outlook Infographic, "Peer support, self-management education, health coaching, and group activities, along with workforce training, and investments in the right technology" are " potential enablers of patient activation and engagement" and " key ingredients for productive health care operations".

== Behavioral Health Educational Mobile Apps ==
In February 2016, PARfessionals' founder, Ms. Kelley Hardison started to partner with several independent app developers to develop Behavioral Health educational apps and games for the Addiction Peer Workforce.

== Mobile Library Garden and Pocket Park Commemoration ==
In the fall of 2016, the AR SJM Family distributed two college preparatory guides, PARfessionals’ Peer Recovery/Cultural Intelligence in Addictions and PARfessionals’ Peer Recovery Navigator Practicum Guide to 240,000+ digital libraries and 2,000 digital publishers across the world.

== Approvals ==
PARfessionals was an approved behavioral health training provider recognized by many states, national and international professional associations and state boards .

== See also ==
- Peer support
- Peer support specialist
- Recovery coaching
- Professional certification
