= CITT =

CITT can refer to:

- Continental Institute of Technology and Transformation
- Canadian International Trade Tribunal
- Canadian Institute of Traffic and Transportation
- Canadian Institute for Theatrical Technology
- Center for Investment, Technology and Trade
