= Grol =

Grol can refer to:

- Grol, the medieval name of Groenlo, a Dutch fortified city and hometown of Grolsch
- GROL, the General radiotelephone operator license issued in the United States
