= AAFM =

AAFM may refer to:

- American Academy of Financial Management, a US-based board of standards, certifying body, and accreditation council
- Anthology of American Folk Music, a six-album compilation released in 1952
