= International Certification Accreditation Council =

Alliance of organizations

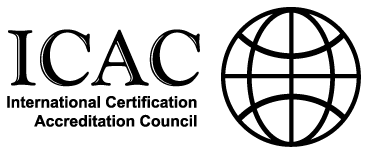
Logo for the International Certification Accreditation Council (ICAC).

The International Certification Accreditation Council (ICAC) is an alliance of organizations dedicated to assuring competency, professional management, and service to the public by encouraging and setting standards for licensing, certification, and credentialing programs.

== Background ==
In 1996, a group of association executives chartered the ICAC as a not-for-profit organization with the purpose of evaluating certification programs at an affordable rate that smaller organizations can afford. In order to accomplish this mission, the organization requires a substantial commitment of volunteer time from accredited associations, keeping administrative overhead to a minimum.

Over the years the ICAC has also developed a comprehensive process to evaluate certification programs against international standards designed not only to confirm the association is complying with industry norms, but also help correct any minor administrative concerns uncovered during the evaluation. In this way, accredited organizations can both improve existing certification programs as well as demonstrate to the public that their programs comply with industry best practices.

By accrediting certification programs, the public and the industries represented have an additional level of assurance, knowing that the program has been reviewed by a neutral third party and been found to meet or exceed reasonable levels of record keeping, security, objectivity, and professionalism.

== Guidelines ==
The ICAC itself operates under the international guidelines established as a quality assurance regime for accreditation bodies (ISO/IEC 17011 – Conformity Assessment: General Requirements for Accreditation Bodies Accrediting Conformity Assessment Bodies), and has established assessment tools and processes that assure certification bodies are in compliance with ISO/IEC 17024 (2012): Conformity Assessment – General Requirements for Bodies Operating Certification of Persons.

== Accredited programs ==
To date, ICAC has reviewed and accredited nearly 100 certification programs, including those listed below.

The Electronics Technicians Association, International, Inc. (ETA^{®} International) Programs

- Over 80 accredited certifications in:
- Basic Electronics
- Biomedical
- Communications
- Fiber Optics & Data Cabling
- Information Technology
- Photonics & Precision Optics
- Renewable Energy
- Smart Home
- Workforce Readiness

SpaceTEC Programs

- SpaceTEC Certified Aerospace Technician Core Certification
- SpaceTEC Vehicle Processing Certification
- SpaceTEC Manufacturing Certification
- SpaceTEC Composites Certification
- CertTEC Basic Composites Certification
- CertTEC Basic Electricity & Electronics Certification

== Members ==
Members of the ICAC board of directors and its various committees are volunteers who draw from many years of experience in managing not-for-profit organizations.
