= CUFCA =

The Canadian Urethane Foam Contractors Association (CUFCA), is an independent not-for-profit trade association representing spray polyurethane foam (SPF) contractors in Canada. CUFCA is a third-party Quality Assurance Program provider and Certification Organization.

CUFCA was established in 1984 by the merger of two predecessor associations to promote and expand the use of spray polyurethane foam in Canada. The primary goal of CUFCA was to ensure the quality of spray polyurethane foam installed in both commercial and residential buildings so customers, homeowners and industry professionals could have confidence in the individuals installing the material and the work completed.

CUFCA's role has grown to include training and licensing of SPF installers, and the education of building officials across Canada.

CUFCA is an ISO-17024 Accredited Certification Organization (CO) to the Spray Foam Industry in Canada. CUFCA is also an ISO-17020 Accredited Inspection Body (IB) for field inspection services to the industry.
