= Corporate Finance Institute =

Financial education company

- Abbreviation: CFI
- Predecessor: MDA Training
- Merged into: Corporate Finance Institute
- Formation: 2016; 10 years ago
- Type: Private
- Headquarters: Vancouver, British Columbia, Canada
- Coordinates: 49°17′5.7438″N 123°6′55.9434″W
- Region served: Worldwide
- Services: Education and certification in finance
- Official language: English
- Key people: Tim Vipond (CEO)
- Staff: 100
- Students: 2,800,000
- Website: corporatefinanceinstitute.com

Corporate Finance Institute (CFI) is an online training and education platform for finance and investment professionals based in Vancouver Canada. It provides courses and certifications in financial modeling, valuation, and other corporate finance topics, including Microsoft Excel, Microsoft Powerpoint, accounting, and business strategy.

CFI has developed programs such as the Financial Modeling & Valuation Analyst (FMVA), Commercial Banking & Credit Analyst (CBCA), Capital Markets and Securities Analyst (CMSA), and Business Intelligence and Data Analyst (BIDA) certifications.

The organization is incorporated as a joint venture with MDA Training, a London-based financial training company founded in 1988 by Walter Reid, one of the founding professors of the London Business School (LBS).

In 2021, Corporate Finance Institute acquired Macabacus, a Microsoft Office Add-In for finance professionals.

== Certifications ==
=== FMVA certification ===
CFI offers the Financial Modeling and Valuation Analyst (FMVA) certification, which comprises 14 required courses in financial topics.

=== CBCA certification ===
CFI also offers the Commercial Banking and Credit Analyst (CBCA) certification for the credit analysts working in banks, credit rating agency and insurance. The program includes 17 optional prerequisites and 15 core courses to build a foundation in credit analysis.

=== BIDA certification ===
The Business Intelligence and Data Analyst certification covers both BI and data science.

== CPE provider ==
Corporate Finance Institute is registered with the National Association of State Boards of Accountancy (NASBA) as a sponsor of continuing professional education (CPE) on the National Registry of CPE Sponsors.

== See also ==
- Financial modelling
- Outline of finance § Financial modeling
- Valuation (finance)
- Professional certification
