= Master Locksmiths Association =

British non-profit trade association

- Abbreviation: MLA
- Founded: 1958
- Type: Trade association
- Legal status: Non-profit organisation
- Purpose: Locksmithing
- Headquarters: Rugby, Warwickshire
- Region served: United Kingdom
- Members: 1400
- Website: www.locksmiths.co.uk

The Master Locksmiths Association (MLA) is a not for profit trade association representing locksmiths in the United Kingdom. It operates a certification program and a referral program to direct consumers to its certified locksmiths. It was established in 1958 and has about 1,400 members.

== Certification and referral ==
Locksmithing does not come under the Security Industry Authority, and there is no government licensing of locksmiths. This in effect means that anyone can trade as a locksmith irrespective of background, motive or competence. In 2009 it became possible to get a background check on a locksmith (unless employed full-time by a school/hospital etc.). This occurred when the Exceptions order for the Rehabilitation of Offenders Act 1974 was changed in July 2009 following debates in the House of Commons and the House of Lords whereby the MLA was added to the list enabling it to get standard level CRB disclosures.

The MLA has its own non-governmental certification process whereby companies are vetted and regularly inspected. It currently has about 350 Approved Companies, which can be found through its "Find a Locksmith" website referral program.

== Membership types ==
The MLA has four member sectors:

- The British Locksmiths Institute – for educational programs
- The Membership sector – for personal and company memberships
- The Affiliate membership sector – for manufacturers and distributors
- The Guild of Keycutters – for the keycutting industry

The MLA offers four grades of individual membership. In ascending order of seniority, these are: Student, Advanced Student, Personal, and Fellow.

The MLA also offers two types of organisation membership – Approved Company membership for locksmithing companies and Affiliate membership for manufacturers and distributors.

=== Former structure ===
Formerly (e.g. in 1998), the four membership divisions were:

- The British Locksmiths Institute (professional body)
- The MLA Trade Division (trade association)
- The MLA Affiliate Division (manufacturers, wholesalers, etc)
- The Guild of Keycutters.

== De facto standards body ==
Within the United Kingdom, publishers of books and periodicals about home and business security commonly recommend the use of MLA members as a source of locks, related security hardware, and advice about physical security measures. This reliance on the MLA by all sectors, in conjunction with the opacity and lack of regulation in the private security industry in the United Kingdom, has led scholars to express concerns about the accuracy of claims made both by and about organisations such as the MLA.

== See also ==
- Associated Locksmiths of America
