= National Payroll Week =

Annual awareness campaign

National Payroll Week (NPW) is a national awareness campaign held annually during the week of Labor Day, hosted by the American Payroll Association (APA) in the United States, the Chartered Institute of Payroll Professionals (CIPP) in the UK, and the Canadian Payroll Association in Canada.

== Government recognition ==
In 2007, Shirley Fanning-Lasseter, mayor of Duluth, Georgia, proclaimed September 3 to 7, as “National Payroll Week” in the City of Duluth.

In 2003, Elvy Robichaud, then the Health and Wellness Minister and Minister Responsible for the Office of Human Resources for the province of New Brunswick, Canada, issued a press release to announce "his support and recognition" of National Payroll Week.

== See also ==
- American Payroll Association
