= Nextpower =

American renewable energy company

Nextpower Inc.
- Formerly: Nextracker Inc. (2013–2025)
- Type: Public
- Traded as: Nasdaq: NXT (Class A); S&P 400 component
- Founded: 2013; 13 years ago
- Headquarters: Fremont, California, U.S.,
- Revenue: US$2,959 million (FY2025)
- Operating income: US$639 million (FY2025)
- Net income: US$509 million (FY2025)
- Total assets: US$3,192 million (FY2025)
- Total equity: US$1,628 million (FY2025)
- Number of employees: 1,300
- Website: nextpower.com

Nextpower Inc. (NXT) is a global energy technology provider based in Fremont, California.

The company was originally established in 2014 as Nextracker Inc. On November 12, 2025, it rebranded as Nextpower to reflect its transformation from solar tracking to energy technology for utility-scale and distributed generation solar power plants.

== History ==
In 2014, Solaria Corporation spun off their tracker technology to create Nextracker, with Dan Shugar as the CEO.

Flextronics purchased Nextracker in 2015 for $330 million. In 2016, Nextracker acquired BrightBox Technologies, Inc., which develops predictive modeling software and machine-learning technologies. This acquisition led to the development and 2017 launch of TrueCapture, an intelligent, self-adjusting tracker control system that continuously refines the tracking algorithm of each individual solar array in response to existing site and weather conditions, delivering 2% to 6% energy gains.

The company expanded to more than 20 U.S. manufacturing lines in Texas, Arizona, Pennsylvania, Illinois, Tennessee, and Nevada between January 2021 and August 2024. As of March 31, 2024, the company’s total global manufacturing capacity was approximately 1,000 MW per week, and supported up to 50 GW of annual shipments.

In February 2023, the company raised $638 million in a U.S. initial public offering, selling 26.6 million shares of Class A common stock at $24 per share, resulting in a corporate valuation of more than $3.5 billion. It debuted on the Nasdaq Global Select Market on February 9, 2023, under the ticker symbol, NXT.

In 2025, the company established an artificial intelligence and robotics division following three acquisitions in the sector and appointed Francesco Borrelli as its first Chief AI and Robotics Officer. On November 12, 2025, it rebranded to Nextpower, marking its transformation into a full-platform company, delivering an integrated portfolio of advanced technologies and services for utility-scale and distributed generation solar power plants.

In March 2026, a judge dismissed a class action lawsuit filed against the company and several of its executives, including Dan Shugar, in the U.S. District Court for the Northern District of California. The lawsuit claimed that the defendants, including Shugar, failed to disclose adverse facts about the company's business and operations, thereby misleading investors. Judge P. Casey Pitts dismissed the complaint, saying investors failed to show that any statements were false or misleading.

In 2026, Nextpower opened a Southeast regional hub in Nashville, Tenn., including a remote monitoring center, while doubling its steel production capacity. The regional hub supplies solar tracking systems used in utility-scale solar plants across the Southeast.

In 2026, Wood Mackenzie ranked Nextpower as the world's leading PV tracker manufacturer, based on first-half 2025 data. The rankings assessed 24 tracker manufacturers based across five countries.

== Technology ==
As of March 31, 2024, the company had more than 600 patents related to solar tracking hardware systems, including innovations that increase energy yields, reduce costs, and expand tracking system applications.

=== Solar trackers ===
The company pioneered decentralized, single-axis trackers that connect each row of solar panels to its own motor and control system. This design allows each solar panel row to move independently to position the panels toward the sun, maximizing energy yield for the entire fleet.

The company’s terrain-following trackers adapt to a site’s natural contours, reducing grading requirements, minimizing environmental impact, and expanding the viability of solar projects on landscapes with extreme terrain.

In 2024, the company introduced tracker technology that uses weather-forecasting data and AI to automatically adjust solar panel angles into a stow mode ahead of hailstorms to avoid direct hits. The product was developed to mitigate the rising cost of insuring solar arrays from hail and other weather-related damage. The same technology is also used to stow panels during grid outages without operator intervention.

=== Software, controls & training ===
The company’s software monitors weather conditions, checks for blind spots, and directs the position of individual rows of solar panels to optimize energy yield. A new tracking function added in 2023 adjusts trackers in response to variations in cloud cover across an entire power plant, enabling plants to chase clouds for added gains without compromising tracking performance during clear sky conditions

=== PowerworX Academy ===
The company’s PowerworX Academy provides operators of utility-scale solar power plants from around the world with training in tracker installation, commissioning, operations and maintenance. Graduates receive professional development credits from the North American Board of Certified Energy Practitioners.

== Acquisitions and Joint Ventures ==
=== 2026 ===
In June 2026, Nextpower signed a definitive agreement to acquire battery energy storage system specialist Prevalon Energy for $365 million. The acquisition, which is expected to close in Q2 of FY2027, extends the company's solar energy technology platform to include applications for power grids, as well as AI and hyperscale data centers.

In 2026, Nextpower signed a definitive agreement to acquire the power conversion business of Zigor Corp. and its subsidiary, Apex Power, for $80.5 million. The acquisition supports Nextpower's expansion into the battery storage and data center markets.

In June 2026, Nextpower signed a definitive agreement to acquire Germany-based Zimmermann PV-Steel Group for up to €330 million in cash and stock. The acquisition, which is expected to close in the second half of FY2027, expands the company's European solar technology portfolio to include fixed-tilt systems, carports, agriPV solutions, and floating PV technologies.

=== 2025 ===
In early 2025, the company expanded its artificial intelligence and robotics capabilities through the acquisitions of Amir Robotics, which provides intelligent, water-free robotic cleaning systems, and Onsight Technology, which develops AI-powered visual recognition systems for automated inspection and fire detection at solar plants. These transactions followed the company’s 2024 acquisition of SenseHawk IP. Together, the acquisitions broadened the company's smart operations and maintenance (O&M) and modeling capabilities.

In May 2025, the company acquired Bentek Corporation, a San Jose–based manufacturer of pre-assembled electrical balance-of-system (eBOS) systems, in a US$78 million cash transaction. Bentek’s products, which collect and transport electricity from solar panels to power-conditioning systems, broadened the company's technology platform.

That same year, the company and Abunayyan Holding, a Saudi energy company, established a joint venture, Nextracker Arabia, to manufacture and supply solar trackers and control systems for utility-scale and distributed solar projects in Saudi Arabia and the Middle East and North Africa (MENA) region. Headquartered in Riyadh, the venture was formed to support Saudi Arabia’s target of installing 130 gigawatts of renewable-energy capacity by 2030.

In September 2025, the company acquired Origami Solar, a Bend, Oregon–based manufacturer of roll-formed steel-frame technology, for $53 million. The acquisition allows the company to shift production of certain solar panel frames from aluminum to steel, which is stronger and more durable.

=== 2024 ===
In 2024, the company acquired solar PV foundations supplier Solar Pile International, located in Leetsdale, Pennsylvania, for US$48 million. The acquisition supports the company’s plans to provide integrated solutions for a broad range of soil conditions at utility-scale projects.

That same year, the company acquired Ojjo, a San Rafael, California-based renewable energy company that specializes in foundation technology and services used in utility-scale solar power projects. Ojjo’s truss systems use half the steel of conventional foundations and are designed to minimize grading requirements in utility-scale projects. The all-cash transaction was valued at US$119 million.

In 2024, the company acquired SenseHawk IP, a developer of AI-enhanced drone technology for high-precision 3D modeling used in solar project planning and construction.

=== 2016 ===
In 2016, the company acquired BrightBox Technologies Inc., a predictive modeling software and machine-learning technologies company. Located in Berkeley, California, BrightBox develops technologies that increase the energy yield of solar projects.

== Sustainability and legacy ==
=== 2026 ===
In 2026, the Science Based Targets Initiative, the global body that assesses corporate climate goals against Paris Agreement requirements, formally validated Nextpower's emissions targets. The validation provides a verifiable and measurable roadmap for achieving the company's net-zero emissions targets.

In 2026, Nextpower partnered with Purdue University on research designed to help rural communities better understand how agrivoltaics -- integrating solar infrastructure with farmland -- can be used to maximize land use and diversify revenue streams. The research addresses farmers' concerns about power outages caused by storms, economic losses from crop damage and uncertainty about agrivoltaic system performance under severe weather conditions.

=== 2025 ===
In 2025, with support from the Australian Renewable Energy Agency (ARENA), the company introduced a foundation solution that uses semi-autonomous drilling to make solar development faster and more feasible on Australia’s toughest terrain. The technology is designed to overcome construction barriers posed by rocky or hard soils, expanding the potential for utility-scale solar development in challenging terrain.

In 2025, Sol Systems completed the 342-MWDC Eldorado Solar project in southeast Illinois. Built by the company in partnership with SOLV Energy, the project combines utility-scale solar with row-crop agriculture—and is considered one of the early row-crop agrivoltaics projects at this scale in the United States. Through a collaboration with the American Farmland Trust, Kernza, a perennial grain, will be cultivated beneath a portion of the solar array.

In 2025, the company teamed with the University of California Berkeley Engineering (UC Berkeley) to establish the CALNEXT Center for Solar Energy Research. The Center will prioritize technologies to enhance power plant performance and operations, with the hopes of increasing the expansion of utility-scale solar. The company contributed a $6.5 million gift to support the initiative.

=== 2023 and 2024 ===
In April 2024, the company introduced a solar tracker system with a carbon footprint that is up to 35% lower than traditional trackers. The low-carbon tracker system, which is produced with an electric arc furnace manufacturing process and uses recycled steel, received the Carbon Trust Product Carbon Footprint Label certification.

In 2023 and 2024, the National Renewable Energy Laboratory (NREL) teamed with the company to advance PV tracker reliability during severe weather events. The company built two self-powered PV tracking systems that were deployed at NREL’s National Wind Technology Center in Golden, Colorado for a large-scale study on the impact of severe weather on the equipment.

In 2023, the company partnered with Samarthanam Trust for the Disabled to install solar PV systems at Government Primary Health Centres in Kondapur and Atmakur, both located in Sangareddy district of India. These 6 kW PV systems donated by the company help bring healthcare services to 50,000 underserved residents in the region.

=== 2022 ===
In 2022, the company partnered with Flex Instituto de Tecnologia to launch the Brazil Center for Solar Excellence, South America’s largest solar tracker research and development facility. Located in Sorocaba, Brazil, the research center, test lab, and training facility addresses every stage of a solar tracker system’s lifecycle.
