= Registered professional liability underwriter =

In the US, the Registered Professional Liability Underwriter (RPLU) designation from the Professional Liability Underwriting Society (PLUS) is considered to be the only professional designation exclusively for people in the professional liability industry. The self-study courses provide a broad, basic overview of the professional liability disciplines. To earn the RPLU designation, a candidate must:

Read eight PLUS Curriculum Core Modules and pass the seven corresponding exams; and Read any five PLUS Curriculum Elective Modules and pass the corresponding exams; and Meet the minimum experience requirement, which is two years in the industry.

Over 2,200 professional liability professionals have earned the RPLU designation to date.

The RPLU community, including current candidates, past designees, and other industry professionals has a LinkedIn discussion group to share ideas, thoughts, and news on the professional liability marketplace. There are currently over 1,500 members of the group.
