= Canadian National Association of Infrared Imaging Technologists =

Canadian professional association

The Canadian National Association of Infrared Imaging Technologists (AIIT) is a Canadian not-for-profit professional association concerned with maintaining high standards of service delivery, training, and continued education of infrared imaging thermographers. The association is a membership driven, self-regulating body for the industry.

AIIT awards and manages the IIT professional certification to qualified thermographers and technologists in Canada.

== See also ==
- Thermographic camera
- Thermography
- Infrared photography
