= American Payroll Association =

Professional organization

PayrollOrg
- Formation: 1982
- Type: Professional Association
- Headquarters: San Antonio
- Members: 21,000
- Executive Dir.: Dan Maddux
- Website: www.payroll.org

PayrollOrg (PAYO), formerly named the American Payroll Association (APA) and the Global Payroll Management Institute is a professional association for individuals responsible for processing company payrolls. The Association conducts payroll training courses and seminars on a yearly basis and publishes a library of payroll resource texts and newsletters. PAYO has approximately 20,000 members, 121 APA-affiliated local chapters, and registered lobbyists based in Washington, D.C.

PayrollOrg was founded in 1982 and is headquartered in San Antonio, Texas with an additional office in Las Vegas. In addition, PAYO owns and operates a learning center at MEET Las Vegas. The Learning Center offer payroll training, focusing on the latest technology and computer networking capabilities.

== Education ==
The biggest of PAYO's educational offerings is its annual Congress. The event features guest speakers (including government officials and industry experts), a payroll and AP exhibit hall, and more than 100 workshops on topics related to payroll and accounts payable (AP). The Association also publishes a library of resource texts and newsletters for payroll professionals.

Educational offerings include a full slate of training courses and conferences for professionals of varying levels of expertise, from entry-level advanced. Training is available in a variety of formats, including live classroom training, eLearning, virtual classrooms, webinars, and webinars on demand.

They also offer a comprehensive library of compliance resources, which is produced by the Association's experienced team of payroll and employment law experts. Publications are issued in many media, including printed text, e-book, magazine, e-magazine, newsletter, e-newsletter, and CD.

== Conferences ==
PAYO holds an annual Congress each May as well as smaller conferences throughout the year. Individual state conferences are organized independently by the PAYO's chapters.

PAYO's national conferences include:

- Payroll Congress is held in May, and is PAYO's largest educational conference, featuring over 200 workshops and an expo hall.
- Payroll Leaders Conference is held in September and provides next-level education for payroll leaders. Multiple speakers provide insights on a variety of topics.
- Educational Institutions Payroll Conference (EIPC) is held in October and focuses on compliance issues impacting payroll and tax professionals working in the higher education community.
- Capital Summit is held in March and focuses on new and developing issues in legislation and regulation that affect payroll operations.

== Government relations ==
PAYO participates in lobbying activities in Washington, D.C., and sponsors multiple member-lead committees called "Government Relations Task Force" committees. The committees cover areas such as the following: Child Support & Other Garnishments, Federal Tax Forms & Publications, Immigration, Payroll Cards, SSA Wage Reporting, and Unemployment Insurance. The purpose of these committees is to communicate the concerns of the payroll community to legislative and executive branches of government, and to find ways for employers to meet their requirements under law and support government objectives while minimizing administrative burden and cost for employers, government, and individual taxpayers.

In May 2008, IRS Commissioner Douglas H. Shulman delivered an address to the attendees of PAYO's 2008 Congress highlighting the importance of the relationship between the IRS and PAYO, stating, "PayrollOrg has a long history of providing valuable advice and feedback to the IRS as we have implemented a number of important tax laws that have played a prominent role in the economic development of our nation."

Further example of PAYO's involvement with various government bodies is its contributions to publications such as the IRS/SSA Reporter. PAYO's Government Relations team frequently submits articles to the quarterly publication released by the IRS.

Additionally, PAYO's Government Relations staff has received SSA's Public Service Award for its ongoing dedication to improving the quality of employer wage and tax reporting and the IRS's Excellence in Partnering Award for its collaboration on clarifying employers' responsibilities and helping IRS educate employers. At IRS, PAYO is a founding member of the Information Reporting Program Advisory Committee and also has had representation on the IRS Advisory Council and the Electronic Tax Administration Advisory Committee.

== Publications and services ==
PAYTECH magazine is PAYO's largest monthly publication and covers payroll management system, technology, professional development, and trends that are affecting the payroll industry.

The association also produces general and topic-focused newsletters including:

- PayState Update: This bi-weekly e-newsletter focuses exclusively on state and local payroll compliance news and issues
- PAYTECHonline: This monthly ezine highlights PAYO events, resources, and feature articles from PAYTECH.
- Payroll Currently: A monthly newsletter that includes a compliance calendar and report from PAYO's Government Relations team.
- Guide to Global Payroll Management: Free e-book available for download that details global payroll issues such as international benefits, wage and tax withholding, reporting requirements, and more.

== Professional certification ==
Payroll certification verifies a specified level of knowledge, skills and abilities in the payroll profession. PAYO offers two levels of professional certification—the Fundamental Payroll Certification (FPC) and the Certified Payroll Professional (CPP).

== National Payroll Week ==
Every year PAYO hosts National Payroll Week, a national celebration and public awareness campaign. National Payroll Week (NPW) is held annually during week of Labor Day, and celebrates the hard work by America's 150 million wage earners and the payroll professionals who pay them. Together, through the payroll withholding system, they contribute, collect, report and deposit approximately $2.08 trillion (68%) of the annual revenue of the US Treasury.

== Global Payroll Management Institute ==
In February 2015 APA launched the Global Payroll Management Institute (GPMI). The Institute was merged with the American Payroll Association to create PayrollOrg in May 2023.
