= Tom Dinwoodie =

Entrepreneur, inventor, and founder of SunPower Corporation Systems

- Born: Thomas Linn Dinwoodie; November 15, 1954 (age 71); St. Paul, Minnesota, United States
- Education: Cornell University; Massachusetts Institute of Technology; University of California, Berkeley
- Occupations: Solar Energy and Cleantech entrepreneur
- Known for: Executive Producer, Time to Choose, a climate solutions documentary SunPower Corporation Systems, CTO; PowerLight Corporation, Founder, President, and CEO

Thomas Linn Dinwoodie (born November 15, 1954) is a cleantech entrepreneur, inventor, and founder of SunPower Corporation Systems (formerly PowerLight Corporation). He holds a long-standing interest in accelerating the transition to clean energy and other climate-sustaining practices. Dinwoodie is also an architect.

== Early business initiatives ==
From 1978 to 1983, Dinwoodie was a research assistant at the MIT Energy Laboratory, where he authored numerous papers on the economics and policy of distributed solar and wind generation, as well as flywheel energy storage.

In 1981, Dinwoodie was awarded a contract from the U.S. DOE for development of an ultra-low-cost, polymer solar thermal collector.

He was founder, president and CEO of TDEnergy, a wind power developer in the U.S. Northeast, from 1982 to 1988. TDEnergy constructed one of the earliest New England wind power facilities in Canaan, NH.

Dinwoodie then founded PowerLight Corporation in 1994, and served as its CEO and chairman of the board from 1995 to 2007. PowerLight was a global manufacturer, supplier, and systems integrator of solar products and services for the residential, commercial, and utility sectors. In 2004, PowerLight was inducted into the INC 500 Hall of Fame. PowerLight merged with SunPower Corporation in 2007, where Dinwoodie served as CEO and later CTO for the subsidiary, SunPower Corporation, Systems. SunPower produces high-efficiency solar cells and modules.

Dinwoodie holds over 30 patents on PV-related products.

== Education ==
Dinwoodie holds a BS in Civil and Environmental Engineering from Cornell University, an MS from the department of mechanical engineering from MIT, and an MArch in architecture from the University of California at Berkeley.

== Current business initiatives ==
Dinwoodie is executive producer of Time to Choose, a film by Charles Ferguson that seeks to raise awareness of the causes of, and solutions to, climate change. The film released in June, 2016.

Dinwoodie is or has been an advisor to, board member, seed investor or founder of a range of clean-tech startups, spanning wind and solar technologies, electric transportation, off-grid micropower, financial services, and clean utilities. These companies include AllPower Labs, Ethical Electric, Etrion Corporation, Fenix Int’l, Keystone Tower Systems, Mosaic, MyDomino, NEW GmbH, Nextpower, PowerLight, SCOOT, Sistine Solar, Sungevity, SunPower Systems, Solar Grid Storage, and TDEnergy.

Dinwoodie serves as lead independent trustee of the Rocky Mountain Institute, a nonprofit think-and-do tank focused on solutions for the transition to a clean energy economy. He also serves on the Sierra Club's Climate Cabinet and Scientific Advisory Panel, the MIT Mechanical Engineering Visiting Committee, and the advisory board to The Solutions Project, and is an advisor to the MIT Energy Club.
