= Electronics Technicians Association =

US-based certification organization

ETA International
- Type: Not for profit 501(c)(6)
- Industry: Educational Assessments; Electronic Assessments; Performance Tests
- Founded: 1978
- Headquarters: Greencastle, Indiana, USA
- Key people: Bryan Allen, President
- Website: www.etai.org

The Electronics Technicians Association, International, Inc. (doing business as ETA International) is a US-based not-for-profit 501(c)(6) trade association founded in 1978. The association provides certifications in industries such as basic electronics, fiber optics and data cabling, renewable energy, information technology, photonics and precision optics, customer service, biomedical, avionics, wireless communications, radar, and smart home. ETA is also one of the 12 COLEMs (Commercial Operator License Examination Manager) for U.S. Federal Communications Commission (FCC) testing. ETA works with technicians, educators, and military personnel. ETA also partners with companies such as Motorola Solutions to provide certification for their employees.

== History ==
In 1965 the U.S. Labor Department, Bureau of Apprenticeship & Training (BAT) instigated a jobs program in cooperation with NEA (National Electronics Association). Local school systems, local TV association members and USDL worked together on an 8,000-hour apprenticeship program aimed at solving the labor shortage problem while finding new vocations for those put out of work by modern technology. This new program would reward trainees but would not cover experienced technicians. Because of this, the Certified Electronics Technician (CET) program was created.

In 1970 a group of technicians decided to form an organization to promote the CET program and the electronics industry as a whole. This organization would be a division of NEA called the International Society of Certified Electronics Technicians (ISCET).

In the mid-1970s NEA and an organization called NATESA merged to form the National Electronic Service Dealers Association (NESDA) with ISCET remaining as a division. Due to a power struggle within the organization, ETA was incorporated in Indiana on November 14, 1978, by a group of former NESDA members and officers. Among those were Richard "Dick" Glass and Ron Crow, two of the original founders of the ISCET CET program and the only administrators at that time. This made it easy to continue the CET program with the newly formed organization. Their goal was to create an association that represented the technician instead of the dealer.

In 1993 ETA became a COLEM for the FCC Commercial Radio License program and offers professionals the chance to sit for seven different FCC commercial licenses at ETA test sites including the general radiotelephone operator license.

In 1996 ETA became accredited by the newly formed International Certification Accreditation Council (ICAC) and was one of the first certification organizations in the electronics industry to establish a maintenance program for certified professionals.

In 2004, ETA helped create the Certified Service Center (CSC) program whose mission is to encourage professionalism with the service industry. The Certified Service Center designation is presented to those service facilities that show they have a percentage of technicians and service managers certified, utilize a code of conduct, provide a service warranty and insurance coverage, adhere to zoning laws, use industry-approved equipment, and provide a clean and accessible facility.

From the 1980s to the present, ETA has continued to expand their certification offerings to fill knowledge and skills assessment gaps in technology. ETA works with many different educators, businesses, and trainers to create vendor-neutral accredited certifications. ETA certifications are used by many different sectors including secondary and post-secondary schools, training businesses, corporations, government agencies, and the U.S. military.

== Certifications ==
ETA offers certifications in various knowledge areas but does not offer courses or training in these areas. ETA does, however, offer endorsements of courses offered through educational institutions through their Course Approval program. Maintenance or renewal of certifications is required to keep in line with the ISO-17024 standards. Most certifications are valid for four years.

=== Basic Electronics ===
- Associate Certified Electronics Technician (CETa) (designated as CESa in Canada)
- Basic Systems Technician (BST)
- Electronics Modules (EM1-5)
  - DC (EM1)
  - AC (EM2)
  - Analog (EM3)
  - Digital (EM4)
  - Comprehensive (EM5)
- Student Electronics Technician (SET)

=== Biomedical ===
- Biomedical Electronics Technician (BET)
- Biomedical Imaging Equipment Technician (BIET)

=== Communications ===
- 5G Technician (5GT)
- Certified Satellite Installer (CSI)
  - Antenna
  - C and KU Band
  - Commercial
  - SMATV
- Distributed Antenna Systems (DAS)
- Distributed Antenna Systems Code Compliance (DASC) - Public Safety
- Distributed Antenna Systems Installer (DASI) - Public Safety
- Distributed Antenna Systems Technician (DAST) - Public Safety
- General Communications Technician - Level 1 (GCT1)
- General Communications Technician - Level 2 (GCT2)
- Line and Antenna Sweep (LAS)
- Microwave Radio Technician (MRT)
- Mobile Communications and Electronics Installer (MCEI)
- Passive Intermodulation Testing (PIM)
- Practical Antenna Basics (PAB)
- RF Interference and Mitigation (RFIM)
- Radar (RAD)
- Telecommunications (TCM)
- Wireless Communications (WCM)

=== Fiber Optics and Data Cabling ===
- Broadband Fiber Installer (BFI)
- Broadband Fiber Technician (BFT)
- Data Cabling Installer (DCI)
- Fiber Optics/Copper Integration Technician-Outside Plant (FCI-OSP)
- Fiber Optics Installer (FOI)
- Fiber Optics Installer for Data Centers (FIDC)
- Fiber Optics Technician (FOT)
- Fiber Optics Technician-Inside Plant (FOT-ISP)
- Fiber Optics Technician-Outside Plant (FOT-OSP)
- Fiber Splicing Specialist (FSS)
- Fiber To Any Antenna (FTAA)
- Fiber Optics Designer (FOD)
- OTDR Testing Specialist (OTS)
- Termination and Testing Technician (TTT)
- ETA Aerospace-based Fiber Optics Certifications
  - ARINC Fiber Optics Fundamentals Professional (AFOF)
  - ARINC Fiber Optics Installer (AFI)
  - ARINC Fiber Optics Technician (AFT)
  - Fiber Optics Evaluation & Endface Cleaning (FEEC)
  - SAE Fiber Optics Fabricator (SFF) and SAE-ARINC Fiber Optics Fabricator (SAFF)

=== Information Technology ===
- Computer Service Technician (CST)
- Information Technology Security (ITS)
- Network Systems Technician (NST)
- Wireless Networking Technician (WNT)

=== Photonics and precision optics ===
- Photonics Technician Operator (PTO)
- Photonics Technician Specialist (PTS)
- Specialist in Precision Optics (SPO)
- Technician in Precision Optics (TPO)

=== Renewable Energy ===
- Electric Vehicle Supply Equipment – Diagnostic Technician (EDT)
- Photovoltaic Installer - Level 1 (PVI1)
- Photovoltaic Installer/Designer (PV2)
- Photovoltaic Solar Selling (PVSS)
- Small Wind Installer (SWI)

=== Smart Home ===
- Certified Alarm-Security Technician (CAST)
- Electronic Security Networking Technician (ESNT)
- Smart Technology Systems (STS)
  - Audio-Video (AV) endorsement
  - Computer Networking (CN) endorsement
  - Environmental Controls (EC) endorsement
  - Security-Surveillance (SS) endorsement
- Smart Technology Systems Master Integrator (STSmi)

=== Workforce Readiness ===
- Certified Service Manager (CSM)
- Customer Service Specialist (CSS)
- Technical Project Supervisor (TPS)

=== Specialty Certifications ===
- Audio-Video Forensic Analyst (AVFA)
- Avionics (AVN)
- Basics of the National Electrical Code® (BEC)
- Commercial Audio Technician (CAT)
- Digital Video Editor (DVE)
- Gaming & Vending Technician (GVT)
- Industrial Electronics (IND)
- Radio Frequency Identification Technical Specialist (RFID)

== Levels of certification ==
- Associate Electronics Technician (CETa) (designated as CESa in Canada)

The Associate Electronics Technician exam is a certification of entry-level electronics professional knowledge to include not only electronics but also safety, record keeping and professionalism. The CETa is good for four years by itself and can be renewed without a journeyman certification. The CETa was changed in November 2013 to allow renewal on a four year basis.

- Journeyman Certified Electronics Technician (CET) (designated as CES in Canada)

To attain the CET, ETA requires the candidate to pass the CETa exam and a qualifying Journeyman Certification Option. The CET is good for four years and can be renewed by retesting or demonstrating 40 hours of upgrade electronics training.

- Senior Certified Electronics Technician (CETsr) (designated as CESsr in Canada)

The Senior Certified Electronics Technician is an upgrade to the Journeyman CET. It requires six-years work experience and an 85% passing score on the CET exam.

- Certified Electronics Technician Master Specialty (CETms) (designated as CESms in Canada)

The ETA Certified Electronics Technician Master Specialty (CETms) certification is designed for any professional with four or more certifications in areas such as fiber optics, information technology, RF communications, and telecommunications.

- Master Certified Electronics Technician (CETma) (designated as CESma in Canada)

A technician with six or more years combined work and electronics training may be eligible for the ETA Master Certified Electronics Technician (CETma) certification. The Master certification was created to showcase those technicians who are able to demonstrate proficiency in the many fields of electronics.

== Accreditation ==
All technical certifications are accredited by the International Certification Accreditation Council (ICAC) and align with the ISO-17024 standard. Independent audits are conducted on a regular basis to ensure compliance.

== Membership ==
Membership is open to anyone who is involved in one of the industries ETA serves. Membership allows voting rights for such things as biannual officer elections and service awards as well as by-law changes and other association business. ETA offers six types of membership for educators, professionals, technicians, and students. Each membership includes a subscription to the High Tech News, ETA's bi-monthly membership magazine.
