= Allied Council for Commerce and Logistics =

Allied Council For Commerce And Logistics
- Company type: Non-Profit; NGO
- Industry: Shipping; Logistics; Supply chain management
- Founded: 2010
- Headquarters: Egypt; UAE; India
- Area served: Worldwide
- Services: Humanitarian; Education; Agriculture; Supply chain management Social Service; Professional Memberships; Scholarships

The Allied Council for Commerce and Logistics (ACCL) is a philanthropic, Non-Profit NGO functioning in the field of shipping and logistics. ACCL was registered in 2010 under the Societies Registration Act, Government of India.

== History ==
The reason behind the formation of ACCL was the dispute between Government of India and the Supreme Court of India regarding the distribution of food grains which was getting damaged due to bad logistics. ACCL was formed with a view to bring private shipping & logistics companies and logisticians to input their views and ideas to improve the plight of Humanitarian Logistics, Agricultural Logistics, Commercial Logistics and Logistics Education in developing countries.

== Area of Operations ==
=== Agricultural Logistics ===
High delivery costs and rising prices caused primarily by a fragmented supply chain, bad logistics, together with poor standards are hurting Developing Countries agriculture exports much more than trade barriers, according to a World Bank report. Despite producing 11 per cent of the world's vegetables and 15 per cent of fruits at very competitive costs of about 53 per cent and 63 per cent of average global prices, India's share in global fruits and vegetables trade has remained at only 1.7 per cent and 0.5 per cent, respectively, the report points out. The council works on the grass root level to train and educate the farmers from rural areas regarding the importance of switching to organized logistics. Traditionally the farmers have been concentrating only on the production aspect of agriculture but the subsequent and most important part of processing, storing and distribution has been largely ignored. This has cost the farmers to receive less price for their products, exploited mainly by the middle men.

=== Humanitarian Logistics ===
The devastating Indian Ocean tsunami in 2004 prompted an unprecedented response from the humanitarian sector. International relief organizations, including the UN, the Red Cross and NGO's, sprang into action, often in collaboration with new or existing partners. Within affected countries, national governments, the armed forces, corporations, social groups and citizens all responded. The resources raised for the humanitarian effort were also unprecedented. The tsunami experience demonstrated once again that a lack of back-room capacity results in front-line failures. This was particularly true for the supply chain (the process of assessing, mobilizing, transporting, tracking, warehousing and distributing supplies and relief items). Surveys performed by international organizations found that there was a severe shortage of logisticians in the field. The 2009 flood in North India also exposed our unpreparedness to meet such circumstances. ACCL is conducting various grass root level programs among the rural communities, NGO etc. to train and educate them regarding the importance to humanitarian logistics and the need for the readiness to face the challenges during such operations.

=== Commercial Logistics ===
Logistics operations in developing countries are still in infant stage. Lack of infrastructure, business processing systems knowledge among small to medium logistics companies have resulted in higher cost and poor performances. Allied Council for Commerce and Logistics provides small to medium scale logistics companies with the following main services.

==== Professional memberships ====
- Free Professional Membership for Companies and Individuals who have interest in shipping and logistics sector.

==== Social Networking of Logistics ====
- Platform for the members to exchange expertise and experience through website.

==== Enterprise Resource Planning ====
- Economical ERP solutions for small logistics companies and farming communities.

=== Logistics Education ===
Allied Council for Commerce and Logistics conducts various courses with the help of private partnerships. ACCL provides scholarships to under privileged students seeking a career in shipping and logistics. Logistics education have been traditionally considered to be expensive and out of the reach for a majority of students from developing nations. The fund required for providing scholarships to students comes mainly in the form of Government funds and private contributions.

==== Logistics Courses ====
The council conducts various courses by partnering with private institutes. Few of them are stated below.

- Diploma in Shipping and Logistics
- Courses in Humanitarian Logistics, Commercial Logistics, Bulk Logistics, Agricultural Logistics

==== Scholarships ====
Scholarships are provided to students from Scheduled Cast, Scheduled Tribes, Other Eligible Cast based on their financial status.
