= ALOA Security Professionals Association =

ALOA Security Professionals Association, Inc
- Abbreviation: ALOA
- Founded: 1955
- Type: Trade association
- Purpose: Locksmithing
- Headquarters: Dallas, Texas
- Region served: United States
- Members: 6,000
- Website: www.aloa.org
- Formerly called: Associated Locksmiths of America

ALOA Security Professionals Association (ALOA, formerly known as the Associated Locksmiths of America) is an American trade organization for locksmiths and other physical security professionals. The organization represents more than 6,000 locksmiths in the United States, Canada, and other countries, making it the largest association of its sort in North America, and conducts professional proficiency certifications for its members.

ALOA's activities include a continuing education (ACE) program, an annual convention and security exposition, and the ALOA Training Center, based in Dallas, Texas.

== History ==
=== Establishment and early conventions ===
The Associated Locksmiths of America (ALOA) was founded in 1955. The executive secretary was Lee Rognon of Modena, New York, with the organization establishing its first headquarters in Kingston, a city located about 25 miles north of Modena.

The group held its first biennial convention in Chicago from July 14–16, 1956, at the Sherman Hotel, bringing together locksmiths from around the country. The 1956 National Convention and Trade Show was directed and managed by Robert Rognon, husband of Lee Rognon. The show was expected to draw 3,000 participants from 46 of the 48 American states.

The 1958 ALOA National Convention was again held at the Sherman Hotel in Chicago, and was a two-day affair, running the weekend of July 19–20. Among the activities conducted by the convention was a lock-picking contest, with Glen Hickenlooper of Salt Lake City, Utah, proclaimed the national champion for a second time.

ALOA Executive Director and Treasurer Lee Rognon as she appeared in 1961.

In 1960, ALOA turned to Washington, D.C., as the location for its third biennial convention, also held in the middle of July. About 1200 members of the organization were in attendance, where they were viewed demonstrations of new burglary-prevention devices and were photographed and fingerprinted for identification in an effort to raise professional standards for locksmiths. The convention once again was the scene of a lock-picking competition, in which Flora E. Gebhart of Shamokin, Pennsylvania, won the women's division with a time of 1 minute and 41 seconds to pick a standard door lock.

During the early 1970s the Associated Locksmiths produced two short educational films as part of an outreach program highlighting security issues with owners of homes and businesses. The first of these, Invitation to Burglary, narrated by actor Raymond Burr, dealt with residential crime and its prevention, while the second, Rip Off, narrated by actor Henry Fonda, concerned the security problems of business and industry. Both of these short films were made available for use by ALOA to groups able to raise an audience of 25 persons or more.

=== Relocation ===
The headquarters of the Associated Locksmiths of America was moved from Kingston, New York, to Dallas, Texas, in the summer of 1973. In addition to its executive offices, the group moved its central library of literature related to the history and practice of locksmithing to its new Dallas facility at this time. Lee Rognon remained Executive Director of ALOA at the time of the organization's move.

== Organization ==
=== Security Expo ===
ALOA hosts a Security Expo which consists of classes, networking events, exhibits, and the annual membership meeting. The 2022 ALOA Security Expo was held at the South Point Hotel, Casino & Spa in Las Vegas. The 2023 ALOA Security Expo was held at the Hilton Orlando Lake Buena Vista in Orlando, Florida.

=== Certifications ===
ALOA holds frequent proficiency certification sessions for experienced locksmiths. Through its Proficiency Registration Program (PRP), ALOA offers five locksmith membership designations: (1) Registered Locksmith (RL); (2) Certified Registered Locksmith (CRL); (3) Certified Professional Locksmith (CPL); (4) Certified Master Locksmith (CML); and (5) Certified Automotive Locksmith (CAL)

=== ALOA LATINO ===
The group also conducts a membership program for locksmiths in Mexico and the Spanish-speaking diaspora called "ALOA LATINO."

=== Safe and Vault Technicians Association ===
ALOA owns the Safe and Vault Technicians Association (SAVTA) and proctors the examinations for its specialty certifications, which include Certified Professional SafeTech (CPS) and Certified Master Safe Technician (CMST).

=== Publication ===
ALOA publishes a monthly digital and paper magazine for its members called Keynotes.

== See also ==
- Master Locksmiths Association
