= American Academy of Financial Management =

US certifying body

- Abbreviation: AAFM
- Formation: 1996
- Type: Certifying and accreditation body
- Purpose: Professional certifications
- Headquarters: Colorado Springs, Colorado
- Region served: United States and overseas
- Leader: George Mentz
- Website: GAFM

The American Academy of Financial Management (AAFM) was a US-based board of standards, certifying body, and accreditation council focused on the finance sector and wealth management professionals. AAFM was superseded by the Global Academy of Finance and Management (GAFM).

== History ==
The AAFM was founded in 1996 through a merger of the American Academy of Financial Management & Analysts (AAFMA) and the Founders Advisory Committee of the Original Tax and Estate Planning Law Review.

In January 2015, the AAFM sold its intellectual property to the Global Academy of Finance & Management – the logo for which is the same as that of the AAFM with different letters – and the International Board of Certification Standards, which subsequently continued the AAFM certifications under the GAFM brand in the United States.

The AAFM offered multiple professional membership, certifications, and designations. Members had to have come through one of the AAFM-recognized university programs or through a government-recognized executive educational program, although the board waived these requirements in some cases. The AAFM board has never directly provided training, but has recognized hundreds of approved providers.

== Certifications/designations ==
The AAFM awarded a number of its own designations, including chartered asset manager (CAM), chartered market analyst (CMA), chartered portfolio manager (CPM), chartered trust and estate planner (CTEP), chartered wealth manager (CWM), and master financial professional (MFP).

Some of these designations were available to anyone with an accredited degree or license in finance, investments, securities, economics, or accounting upon payment of a fee. CWM certification normally involved about 80 hours of online study, although holders of certain professional designations, such as a Chartered Financial Analyst (CFA) or Certified Public Accountant (CPA), needed only to take a test and pay a fee; and anyone with sufficient professional experience could skip the test and get the designation by only paying fees. Those with a degree that involved at least some business coursework could also take an AAFM certification course, pay a fee, and receive an MFP.

According to the Financial Industry Regulatory Authority (FINRA) eight designations were "offered and recognized by the issuing organization" (i.e., AAFM). FINRA does not state on these pages that they, or anyone else, recognises them. FINRA does state that it does not approve or endorse any professional credential or designation listed on its website.

In October 2010, The Wall Street Journal published an article detailing the use of questionable credentials by financial advisors that discussed the AAFM extensively. The article noted that the AAFM included among its Global Board of Academic Advisors & Professors several individuals who had never given their permission to be listed as board members. The article criticized the practice of many standards boards, AAFM included, of awarding credentials without requiring applicants to undergo any sort of assessment or examination, quoting the AAFM's founder, George Mentz, as evidence of this practice.

A claim on the AAFM website that it had a special affiliation with both the CFA Institute and the CFP Board, which administer Chartered Financial Analyst and Certified Financial Planner certificate programs, respectively, was rebutted by representatives of both organizations in the article. The CFP Board said that the AAFM had once helped provide continuing education for CFPs, but that it hasn't done so since 2006. Some of the individuals listed in a board of advisors told the WSJ they had no idea they were listed and hadn't agreed to it.

The AAFM has countered that individuals listed on its board of advisors did consent to be listed, posting emails from two individuals on its website. The organization also posted to its website part of the signature page of a document agreeing that the Association for Investment Management Research (the precursor to the CFA Institute) would not contest the AAFM's trademarks, with the signature itself blanked and replaced with the type-written statement, "Signed by Sharon Glover, who must have been Jeannie Andersons Boss at the time" [sic]. What appears to be a version of the same faxed agreement can be found on the GAFM website, with a signature by "Sharon Glover" and the handwritten information "VP & Assoc. General Counsel 1/5/04".

== Affiliations and collaborations ==
Global Academy of Finance and Management (GAFM)'s certifications and trademarks are owned by Colorado, United States–based International Board of Standards (IBS), a certifying body which is in operation around 40 countries globally. IBS is a charter member signatory to the Washington, D.C.–based Council for Higher Education Accreditation (CHEA) and has agreement with the Kansas, US–based Accreditation Council for Business Schools and Programs (ACBSP) since 2004.

GAFM has continued its international certification activities through national chapters and approved education providers. Independent media have reported certification programmes in financial technology, management consulting, competency mapping and corporate training in Sri Lanka between 2021 and 2025.

GAFM has also supported professional development initiatives, including the Asian Digital Finance Forum & Awards 2023 and 2025 held in Colombo, Sri Lanka.
