= National Payroll Institute =

Canadian nonprofit organization

- Type: Nonprofit
- Location: Toronto, Ontario, Canada
- Coordinates: 43.672°N 79.381°W
- Official languages: English and French
- President: Peter Tzanetakis
- Website: Official website
- Formerly called: Canadian Payroll Association

The National Payroll Institute is a professional association representing payroll workers in Canada. The Institute was formed in 1978 as the Canadian Payroll Association, and rebranded in 2022. The Institute offers two certification programs for payroll administrators and managers, and advocates for the profession and employers' interests through government lobbying and its magazine, Dialogue.

Since 1995, the Institute has hosted National Payroll Week in Canada, coinciding with the observance in other countries.

== Background ==
The CPA was founded in 1978 by a group of payroll practitioners who proposed changes to the first Record of Employment (ROE) form. They advocate on behalf of employers to federal and provincial/territorial governments, seeking to proactively influence payroll- and benefits-related legislation to enable all stakeholders to administer them in an efficient and effective manner.

As of 2005, the association had over 10,000 members and 75% of Canadian employees were paid through member companies.

The association changed its name from Canadian Payroll Association to National Payroll Institute in 2022.

A series of surveys by the association have shown that about half of Canadians live from paycheque to paycheque.

=== Certification ===
The CPA offers two Certifications, Payroll Compliance Professional (PCP) and Payroll Leadership Professional (PLP, formerly Certified Payroll Manager, CPM). The required courses for each certification are:

Payroll Compliance Professional (PCP)	Payroll Leadership Professional (PLP)
Payroll Compliance Legislation	Introduction to Payroll Management
Payroll Fundamentals 1	Applied Payroll Management
Introduction to Accounting	Managerial Accounting
Payroll Fundamentals 2	Compensation and Benefits Management
	Organizational Behaviour Management

Certification holders are required to:

- adhere to a Professional Code of Conduct;
- maintain membership with the NPI; and
- participate in continuing professional education (CPE).

Payroll courses are offered at over 50 post-secondary institutions and 90 campuses across Canada. The courses are also offered through an instructor led online program that starts every month.

== Professional development ==
The CPA holds more than 400 professional development seminars across Canada each year to address key payroll topics ranging from Learning Payroll I and II which covers the basics, to Taxable Benefits and Year-end.

The CPA's Annual Conference & Trade Show, held in a different city each year, is a payroll networking event featuring more than 50 educational and keynote sessions. It also includes the largest payroll trade show in Canada.

National Payroll Week (NPW) is the largest annual public relations initiative of the Canadian Payroll Association. NPW recognizes the accomplishments of payroll professionals, the payroll community and The Canadian Payroll Association (CPA), by building greater awareness of the size and scope of payroll and its impact on business, government and employees across Canada. It was created in 1995.
