= General radiotelephone operator license =

US license required for operation or repair of certain radio equipment

The general radiotelephone operator license, (GROL) is a license granted by the U.S. Federal Communications Commission (FCC) that is required to operate certain radio equipment. It is required for any person who adjusts, maintains, or internally repairs FCC licensed radiotelephone transmitters in the aviation, maritime, and international fixed public radio services. It is also required to operate any compulsorily equipped ship radiotelephone station with more than 1,500 watts of peak envelope power, a voluntarily equipped ship, or an aeronautical (including aircraft) station with more than 1,000 watts of peak envelope power. The GROL is not required for engineering jobs in radio and television broadcasting. It is obtained by taking a test demonstrating an adequate knowledge of the legal, technical, and safety aspects of radio transmitter operation.

The GROL is the most common FCC commercial license, accounting for about 80% of those issued by the commission, because of the wide range of positions that require it. Like all FCC commercial licenses, the GROL is issued for the lifetime of the licensee. The GROL conveys all of the operating authority of the Marine Radio Operator Permit (MROP). An MROP is required to operate radiotelephone stations aboard vessels of more than 300 gross tons, vessels that carry more than six passengers for hire in the open sea or any coastal/tidewater area of the United States, certain vessels that sail the Great Lakes, and to operate certain aviation radiotelephone stations and certain coast radiotelephone stations. The GROL does not confer licensing authority to operate or maintain GMDSS, amateur radio stations, or radiotelegraph (Morse code) commercial stations.

An endorsement that can be added to the GROL, as well as to both the GMDSS Maintainer and Radiotelegraph licenses, is the "Ship Radar Endorsement" that allows the holder to install, service, and maintain radar systems onboard vessels.

== History ==
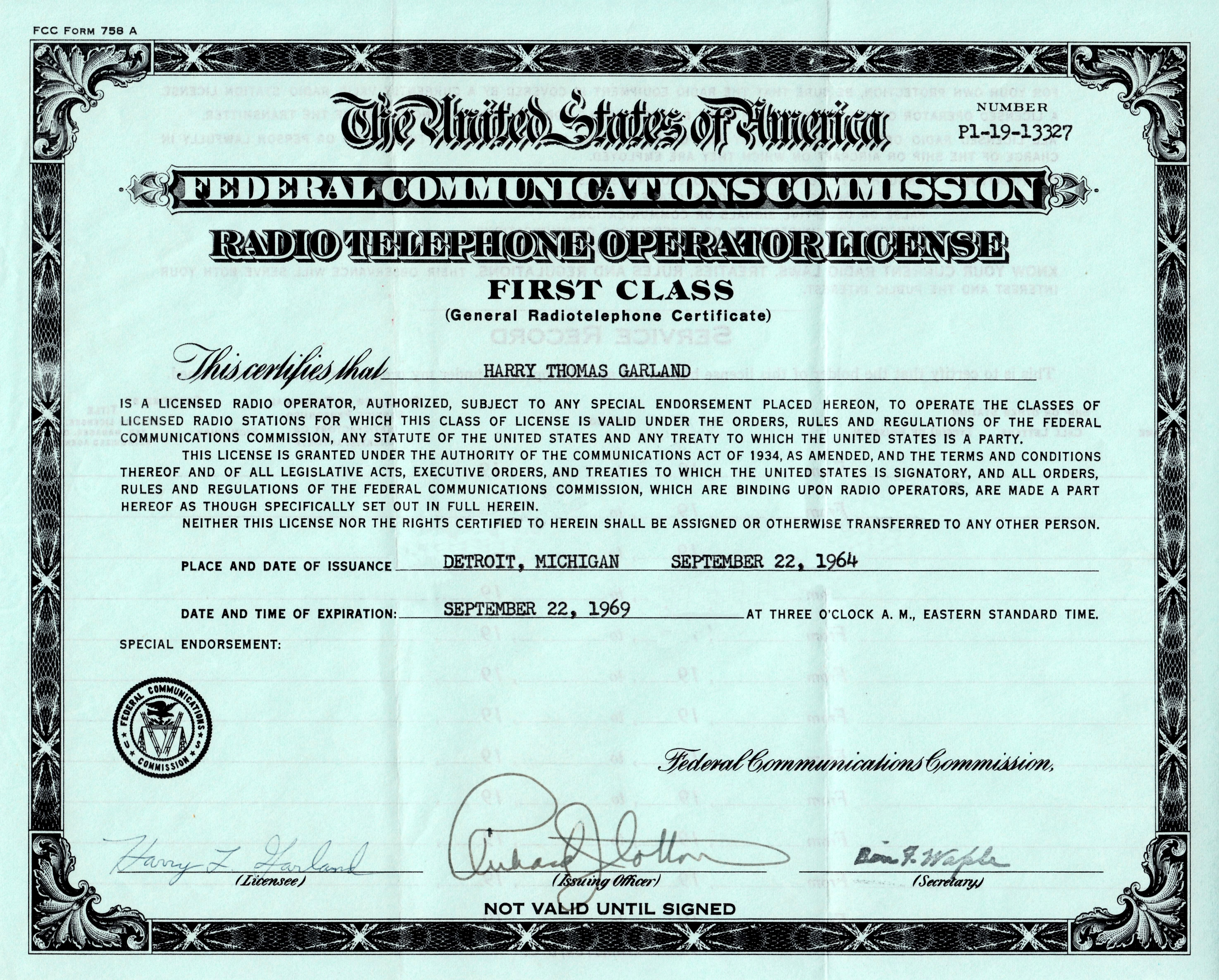
First Class Radiotelephone License issued in 1964

The first commercial operator licenses were issued by the Department of Commerce and then later by the Federal Radio Commission under the authority of the Radio Act of 1927. When the FCC was created in 1934, it took over this function. The commission issued First and Second Class Radiotelephone Operator Licenses. In 1953 a Third Class permit was added.

As they developed after World War II, the "First Phone" (Class) license was required to be a chief engineer at a broadcast station and to work on television transmitters. The "Second Phone" certificate was often held by radio transmitter repairpersons, such as those in the aviation and maritime industries. The Third Class permit was required for announcers who had to record meter readings or who operated low-power radio broadcast stations. From 1963 to 1978 an additional simple technical written test added a "Broadcast Endorsement" to the "Third Phone" which allowed announcers to be the sole operators at some limited power radio stations.

Obtaining any of the certificates required passing sequentially written examinations. To obtain the Second Class license required first passing the test for the Third Class permit, which was an easy exam on broadcast rules and operating procedures. To test for the First Class license one had to have passed the exam for a Second Class license. Because it included the entire field of electronics transmission, the examination to earn the Second was generally thought of as more difficult than that of the First, which concentrated on broadcast radio and television.

As technology rapidly changed, transmitters required less skill to manage. In the spirit of deregulation and to reduce its personnel and other associated costs, the FCC progressively yielded more of its control to broadcasters and eased licensing requirements. In 1980 the name of the Third Phone was changed to the Marine Radio Operator Permit and was subsequently renewed under that name. In 1983 testing stopped for the First Class license. Shortly afterward all renewing First and Second Class licenses were issued as GROLs. Like all previous commercial licenses, they were issued with renewable five-year terms, but in 1984 certificates began to be granted or renewed as lifetime documents. Today, the GROL examinations cover FCC broadcast regulations (the old Third Class test elements) and communications electronics (what was once the Second Class exam). However, a license is no longer legally required for work in a broadcast station.

== Qualifying for the GROL ==
=== Qualifying ===
To qualify for the GROL, one must:

- Be a legal resident of (or otherwise eligible for employment in) the United States.
- Be able to receive and transmit spoken messages in English.
- Pass written exam Elements 1 and 3.

How to Obtain a License:

To obtain a GROL License, one must submit to the FCC, Form 605 and Form 159 with Proof of Passing Certificates for Elements 1 and 3. (Some Commercial Operator License Examination Managers will submit these forms for the applicant.)

All exam questions are multiple-choice.

=== Element 1 – Marine Radio Operator Permit (MROP) ===
Basic radio law and operating practice.

- Rules & Regulations – 6 questions
- Communications Procedures – 6 questions
- Equipment Operations – 6 questions
- Other Equipment – 6 questions

Marine Radio Operator Permit question pool: 144 questions.

To pass one must answer 18 of 24 questions (75%) correctly.

=== Element 3 – General Radiotelephone Operator License ===
Electronic fundamentals and techniques are required to adjust, repair, and maintain radio transmitters and receivers.

Element 3 exams will consist of questions in the following categories:

- Principles – 8 questions
- Electrical math – 10 questions
- Components – 10 questions
- Circuits – 4 questions
- Digital logic – 8 questions
- Receivers – 10 questions
- Transmitters – 6 questions
- Modulation – 3 questions
- Power Sources – 3 questions
- Antennas – 5 questions
- Aircraft – 6 questions
- Installation, Maintenance, and Repair – 8 questions
- Communications Technology – 3 questions
- Marine – 5 questions
- Radar – 5 questions
- Satellite – 4 questions
- Safety – 2 questions

General Radiotelephone Operator License question pool: 600 questions

To pass one must answer 75 out of 100 questions (75%) correctly.

=== Element 8 – Ship Radar Endorsement ===
The Ship Radar Endorsement is required to repair, maintain or internally adjust ship radar equipment. It may, as an option, be added to the GROL.

To qualify, one must:

- Hold or qualify for a GROL, GMDSS Radio Maintainer's License, First Class Radiotelegraph Operator's Certificate, or Second Class Radiotelegraph Operator's Certificate. Those last two licenses are no longer issued. The Radiotelegraph Operator's License (T), issued in May 2013, also can have added to it a ship radar endorsement.
- Pass Element 8 written exam.

Element 8 – Ship Radar Endorsement

Ship Radar Techniques. Specialized theory and practice applicable to the proper installation, servicing, and maintenance of ship radar equipment in general use for marine navigation purposes.

Element 8 exam consists of questions in the following categories:

- Radar Principles – 10 questions
- Transmitting Systems – 8 questions
- Receiving Systems – 10 questions
- Display & Control Systems – 10 questions
- Antenna Systems – 5 Key Topics – 5 questions
- Installation, Maintenance & Repair – 7 questions

Ship Radar Endorsement question pool: 300 questions

To pass one must answer 38 out of 50 questions (76%) correctly.

== Study preparation ==
=== Study materials ===
Popular tools used to prepare for the GROL License are:

A book to study for the GROL License, FCC Examination Question Pools Downloads and/or Ham Study FCC Commercial Elements 1 to 9.

=== Scientific calculator ===
A non-programmable scientific calculator. Programmable calculators are not allowed to be used during exams.

=== Preparation software ===
Many applicants use a software program to help prepare for the GROL exams. Preparation software will create practice tests. Some of the GROL preparation software will find questions in which the applicant is weak and drill more extensively on them.

== Commercial Operator License Examination Managers ==
The actual examinations are given by Commercial Operator License Examination Managers, (COLEMs). Fees typically range from $25–$35 per element.

The FCC site has a page that has links to COLEMs: .

== See also ==
- Electronics Technicians Association
- International Society of Certified Electronics Technicians
- Radio horizon
