= Peer support specialist =

Supporter with first hand experience

A peer support specialist is a person with "lived experience" who has been trained to support those who struggle with mental health, psychological trauma, or substance use. Their personal experience of these challenges provide peer support specialists with expertise that professional training cannot replicate.

Some roles filled by peer support specialists include assisting their peers in articulating their goals for recovery, learning and practicing new skills, helping them monitor their progress, supporting them in their treatment, modeling effective coping techniques and self-help strategies based on the specialist's own recovery experience, supporting them in advocating for themselves to obtain effective services, and developing and implementing recovery plans.

In 2007, the Department of Health and Human Services recognized peer support services as an evidence-based practice. The department was also informed by all 50 state Medicaid directors that The Centers for Medicare and Medicaid Services would pay for peer support services, provided that peer support specialists—like other types of healthcare providers—were governed by a statewide training and credentialing program. As of 2016, 42 US states, the District of Columbia, and the Veterans' Administration have adopted such programs to train and certify individuals to work as peer support specialists.

== Recovery planning ==
Recovery plans can take many forms. A key component of the recovery management model is a personal recovery plan which is drawn up by the individual looking for support, and reviewed with an RSS. This plan is instrumental for individuals in the process of their recovery.

Central to such plans are the overall health and well-being of each individual, not just their mental health. Components often include support groups and individual therapy, basic health care maintenance, stable housing, improvements in family life and personal relationships, and community connections. The plan may also include education goals, vocational development and employment. Some plans outline a timetable for monitoring, and/or a plan for re-engagement when needed to balance the health and overall quality of life of each individual.

Peer recovery support specialists can be found in an increasing variety of settings, including community-based recovery centers. Funding for peer recovery programs comes from a combination of federal and state agencies as well as local and national charities and grant programs, such as Catholic Charities and the United Way.

== Training and certification ==
When peer support specialists work in publicly funded services, they are required to meet specific government and state certification requirements. Since the adaptation of the Recovery Management Model by state and federal agencies, peer support specialist courses have been offered by numerous state, nonprofit and for-profit entities such as Connecticut Community for Addiction Recovery, PRO-ACT (Pennsylvania Recovery Organization-Achieving Community Together), The McShin Foundation, Tennessee Certified Peer Recovery Specialist Training and Program, Appalachian Consulting Group, and the State of New York's Office of Addiction Services. PARfessionals has developed the first internationally approved online training program for peer support specialists in the fields of mental health and addiction recovery. In addition, numerous for-profit firms offer peer support specialist training. Training includes courses on the ethics of a recovery coach, recovery coaching core competencies, clinical theories as stages of change, motivational interviewing, and management of co-occurring disorders.

== Core competencies ==
Adapted for the recovery support specialist by William L. White:

- Outreach worker: Identifies and engages hard-to-reach individuals; offers living proof of the transformative power of recovery and makes recovery attractive.
- Motivator: Exhibits faith in client's capacity for change, encourages and celebrates their recovery achievements, and mobilizes internal and external recovery.
- Resources: Encourages the client's self-advocacy and economic self-sufficiency.
- Ally and confidant: Genuinely cares and listens to the client, can be trusted with confidences, and can identify areas of potential growth.
- Truth-teller: Provides feedback on the recovery progress. Identifies areas which have presented or may present roadblocks to continued abstinence.
- Role model and mentor: Offers their life as living proof of the transformative power of recovery and provides stage-appropriate recovery education.
- Planner: Facilitates the transition from a professionally directed treatment plan to a client-developed and directed personal recovery plan. Assists in structuring daily activities around this plan.
- Problem solver: Helps resolve personal and environmental obstacles to recovery.
- Resource broker: Is knowledgeable of information, for individuals or for their families, about sources of sober housing, recovery conducive employment, health and social services, and recovery support. Matches the individuals with particular support groups or twelve-step meetings.
- Monitor or companion: When the client will be best served with regular, around the clock attendance, or attendance for a set number of hours per day, the client may need a sober companion. This companion can be available for travel in and out of the country. The sober companion processes each client’s response to professional services and mutual aid exposures to enhance engagement, reduce attrition, and resolve problems in the relationship. The companion provides early re-intervention and recovery re-initiation services.
- Tour guide: Introduces newcomers into the culture of recovery; provides an orientation to recovery roles, rules, rituals, language, etiquette; and opens doors for opportunities for community participation.
- Advocate: Provides an invaluable service for those resistant to remaining abstinent from drugs and/or alcohol, but who must do so due to legal, medical, family or contractual obligations. Helps the individual's families navigate complex social, service and legal systems.
- Educator: Provides a client with normative information about the stages of recovery. They can facilitate the process necessary to remain free from the addiction, inform client of the professional helpers within the community and about the prevalence, pathways, and lifestyles of long-term recovery.
- Community organizer: Every member of the community support center helps develop and expand recovery support resources, enhances cooperative relationships between professional service organizations and local recovery support groups, cultivates opportunities for people in recovery to participate in volunteerism, and performs other acts of service to the community.
- Lifestyle consultant/coach: Supports the client through challenges arising from everyday activities. For some, this is done through several one-on-one sessions each week, while some clients prefer daily telephone contact. Assists individuals and their families to develop sobriety-based rituals of daily living; and encourages activities across religious, spiritual, and secular frameworks that enhance life's meaning and purpose.
- Friend: Provides sober companionship; a social bridge from the culture of addiction and mental illness to the culture of recovery.

== See also ==
- Drug rehabilitation
- Mutual aid
- Recovery coaching
- Self-help groups for mental health
