= Professional Liability Underwriting Society =

Plus Web
- PLUS Logo
- Formation: 1986
- Type: Professional Society
- Legal status: Non-Profit
- Purpose: Professional Development
- Headquarters: Minneapolis, MN
- Region served: Worldwide
- Members: Over 38,000
- Website: plusweb.org

The Professional Liability Underwriting Society (PLUS) is a non-profit organization with membership open to persons interested in the promotion and development of the professional liability industry.

== History ==
PLUS was founded in 1990. Since then, PLUS has grown from 300 members to over 7,000 members, representing over 1,000 companies active in the many fields of professional liability, including underwriters, brokers, risk managers, program managers, attorneys, claims examiners, general agents, teachers/professors, and students.

== Education ==
PLUS is recognized in the industry as the primary source of professional liability educational programs and seminars. The Society's comprehensive educational approach includes an annual International Conference, annual symposia, the RPLU designation program, and educational events organized by regional chapters of PLUS, all of which provide educational and networking opportunities.

The Registered Professional Liability Underwriter (RPLU) Program provides participants with a broad, basic understanding of professional liability disciplines. The RPLU designation is the only industry designation for professionals in the field of professional liability. PLUS has developed a comprehensive curriculum for the professional liability industry. The curriculum includes 23 modules, including core modules:

- Fundamentals of Liability Insurance/Commercial General Liability Insurance: Overview
- Professional Liability Insurance: Overview
- Financial Analysis
- Professional Liability Reinsurance
- Professional Liability Insurance Claims
- Medical Professional Liability Insurance: Introduction
- Directors & Officers Liability Insurance: Introduction

PLUS University is a two-day, classroom-style instructional event designed for new entrants to the professional liability industry. The curriculum for PLUS University is drawn from the RPLU modules, and courses are led by experienced members of the industry.

== Events and programming ==
PLUS holds an annual International Conference, which brings together thousands of members from throughout the United States and around the world for three days of world-class educational programming and networking opportunities. From the inaugural meeting in 1988, which had 125 attendees, the annual International Conference has grown dramatically in both the number of attendees and in the breadth of topics covered.

The International Conference has been attended in recent years by around 2,000 participants annually and has featured speakers and panel presentations on current industry topics including legal malpractice, the Foreign Corrupt Practices Act, the financial crisis, crisis management, shareholder litigation, and employment discrimination. Keynote speakers included former United States Secretary of State Condoleezza Rice and co-founder of Apple Computer, Inc., Steve Wozniak. Past conferences have featured noted speakers from within and outside the professional liability industry, including former United States President, Bill Clinton, and former United States Secretary of State, General Colin Powell, Prime Minister Tony Blair and best-selling author Daniel Pink. The 26th annual Conference is scheduled for November 4–6, 2013 in Orlando, Florida and will feature speakers including Dr. Madeleine Albright, Jeb Bush, William Cohen, Karen Hughes, and others.

PLUS also organizes panel discussions and educational, networking and charitable events throughout the year. Key events include a D&O Symposium held annually in New York which focuses on directors and officers liability issues, a Professional Risk Symposium, which focuses on employment practices, errors and omissions, and fiduciary liability, and a Medical Professional Liability Symposium. In 2013, PLUS also put on three regional professional liability symposia in Singapore, Hong Kong, and Zurich, Switzerland. Regional chapters also organize regular educational, networking and charitable events.

== Publications ==
PLUS publishes the PLUS Journal semiannually. The Journal highlights members of the professional community, including career moves and advancements, designation earners, and events from the previous six months.

== Future PLUS ==
On June 15, 2011, PLUS announced the Future PLUS initiative. Future PLUS seeks to attract, educate and retain the next generation of professional liability insurance specialists to ensure a bright future for the industry and PLUS, its flagship educational and networking association.

A key component of the Future PLUS initiative is the establishment of a new membership level for professionals who are 35 years old or younger. The Future PLUS membership level allows professionals who are newer to the industry to join PLUS for just $50 annually and includes the full benefits of a PLUS membership, including member rates for the PLUS curriculum, national and chapter events, member access to plusweb.org, and receipt of the monthly PLUS Journal. In addition, a member of the Future PLUS Committee will participate in all PLUS Board meetings.

Future PLUS is charged with finding ways to expand and enhance PLUS's traditional education, information and networking offerings to increase the appeal and relevance of PLUS to new generations of professional liability professionals. A main focus of Future PLUS is building the skills of members through public speaking workshops, opportunities to speak on panels and access to industry events. Future PLUS also communicates the needs and interests of next-generation members of the insurance community to the PLUS Board to develop a Society that appeals to a younger, more diverse generation of professionals. Future PLUS seeks to maintain a vibrant and engaged association that benefits members of all ages.

== Awards ==
The "PLUS1 Award" is presented to a person whose efforts have contributed substantially to the advancement and image of the professional liability industry. Criteria include reputation and success in the professional liability industry, history of lectures and service on panels addressing topics in the industry, current activity in professional liability, activity and involvement in PLUS, longevity in the insurance industry, and measure of impact on the professional liability industry.

The "Founders Award" recognizes a member of PLUS who has made lasting and outstanding contributions to the Society. The Award is presented in honor of the spirit and dedication of PLUS Founder Angelo J. Gioia and other individuals who have contributed selflessly to create PLUS and establish it as the voice of the professional liability industry.

== Philanthropy ==
The PLUS Foundation is a separate nonprofit organization that serves the membership of the Professional Liability Underwriting Society (PLUS). The Foundation identifies, initiates and sponsors a variety of charitable programs that give individuals and companies the opportunity to make a difference.
