= Recovery coaching =

Support for addiction management and recovery

Recovery coaching is a form of strengths-based support for people with addictions or in recovery from alcohol, other drugs, codependency, or other addictive behaviors. There are multiple models, with some programs using self-identified peers who draw from their own lived experience with substance use and recovery and some utilizing people who have no lived experience but some training in support, depending on local standards and availability. They help clients find ways to stop addiction (abstinence) or reduce harm associated with addictive behaviors. These coaches can help a client find resources for harm reduction, detox, treatment, family support and education, local or online support groups; or help a client create a change plan to recover on their own.

Recovery coaches do not offer primary treatment for addiction, do not diagnose, and are not associated with any particular method or means of recovery. They support any positive change, helping persons coming home from treatment to avoid relapse, build community support for recovery, or work on life goals not related to addiction such as relationships, work, or education. Recovery coaching is action-oriented with an emphasis on improving present life and reaching future goals.

Recovery coaching is unlike most therapy because coaches do not address the past, do not work to heal trauma, and put little emphasis on feelings. Recovery coaches are unlike licensed addiction counselors in that they are non-clinical and do not diagnose or treat addiction or any mental health issues.

== Relationship to life coaching ==
Similar to life and business coaching, recovery coaching uses a partnership model wherein the client is considered to be the expert on his or her life, the one who decides what is worth doing, and the coach provides expertise in supporting successful change. Recovery coaching focuses on achieving goals important to the client, not just recovery-related goals. The coach asks questions and offers reflections to help the client reach clarity and decide what steps to take. Recovery coaching emphasizes honoring values and making principle-based decisions, creating a clear plan of action, and using current strengths to reach future goals. The coach provides accountability to help the client stay on track.

== Other similar terms ==
The moniker "recovery coach" is used for a variety of specific addiction support roles. The main distinction is between the professional or highly compensated recovery coach and the volunteer or agency-employed peer recovery support specialist. Recovery support roles include the following:

=== Sober escort ===
A sober escort, or travel escort, is a paid sober travel companion or travel escort that accompanies a client to an event, to treatment, or to court, to ensure the client maintains sobriety. Transportation can be a significant challenge to a newly abstinent person. Whether the client is interested in maintaining an ongoing recovery or just needs to stay abstinent for a period of time, getting from point A to point B can be difficult. This version of a recovery coach may be required to transport a person in recovery across town, across the state, or across the county.

=== Sober companion ===
A sober companion or sober coach works full-time with the client: full work days, nights, weekends or extended periods where the coach is by the client's side 24 hours a day. This long-term option can begin with treatment discharge and may develop into a coaching relationship that continues for several weeks, months or longer.

When returning home from treatment, the client trades a secure, drug-free environment for a situation where they know there are problems. The sober companion may provide the symbolic and functional safety of the treatment center. This coach will introduce the client to 12-step meetings, guide them past former triggers for their addiction, and support them in developing a recovery plan. The sober companion helps the client make lifestyle changes in order to experience a better quality of life in the first crucial days after discharge from a treatment center. Sometimes a recovery coach is necessary to keep a client sober in order to regain custody of a child.

=== Recovery support specialist ===
A recovery support specialist (RSS) or a peer recovery support specialist (PRSS) is a non-clinical person who meets with clients in a recovery community organization or goes off-site to visit a client. They may volunteer for these coaching services, or be employed by a recovery community organization for a low wage. The recovery support specialist ensures there is a contract for engagement, called a personal recovery plan. This is a key component of the recovery management model, which all RSSs follow. These specialists are sometimes also called "recovery coaches". William L. White, researcher and original author of the recovery management model, uses the term "recovery support specialist". This is referenced in the paper titled "Recovery Oriented System of Care (ROSC) Substance Use Disorder (SUD) Glossary of Terms", compiled by the Bureau of Substance Abuse and Addiction Services (BSAAS). Another term for a peer recovery support specialist is "peer mentor".

=== Family recovery coach ===
The family plays an important role for a person in recovery but is often neglected by traditional models of recovery. Specially trained family recovery coaches strive to create a calm, objective, non-judgmental environment for the family of a recovering addict. They are knowledgeable in specific models that help the family cope with the changes that they have gone through living with an active addict or living with a recovering addict. Regardless of an addict's choices, working with a family recovery coach may help a spouse, partner, or loved ones avoid the mental obsession that plagues many families affected by addiction and learn to lead sane and productive lives.

=== Phone or virtual recovery coach ===
A phone or virtual recovery coaching relationship may be established to continue beyond the face-to-face meeting of a client and a recovery coach. Today, many treatment centers are embracing virtual recovery coaching, and linking phone or virtual recovery coaches with clients prior to leaving treatment, as a way to continue the connection to the treatment center, as well as meeting the guidelines of an aftercare program. Online virtual coaching programs also exist, either fee-based or for free, that will help anyone apply the methods of recovery (e.g. developing a recovery plan and building recovery capital), whether the client has completed a stay at a treatment center or has relapsed many months after treatment.

=== Legal support specialist ===
Lawyers dealing with criminal drug cases or drug courts sometimes request a type of recovery coaching to ensure a client (perhaps under house arrest, enrolled in a drug court outpatient program or pending trial) stays sober as per the law's mandate. Recovery coaches with the required certification and legal knowledge are contracted for this purpose. Certified Peer Recovery Support Specialists, Licensed clinical social workers or certified alcohol and drug counselors with training in assessments can perform these tasks. The court will request them to perform a client assessment and work with the client on a continuing basis and re-assess after a period of time. The coach will then draft a letter to the court and offer suggested placement in a residential alcohol/drug treatment center, an outpatient treatment program, or a sober living facility. A legal support specialist can also appear in court with the client and provide transportation to or from the courthouse.

=== In the emergency departments of hospitals ===
The AnchorED program, developed in 2014 with a group of Rhode Island hospitals and the Anchor Community Recovery Center in Providence RI, was launched in an attempt to reduce the instance of accidental opioid overdose by connecting overdose patients with Certified Recovery Coaches in the emergency departments of regional hospitals. The AnchorED program is now a benchmark in this field and is used nationwide. This program is meant to connect people experiencing an overdose or revived from an overdose in the ED in the hospital emergency departments with peer-to-peer recovery support. Specially trained ED Peer Recovery Specialists are on call to all Emergency Departments 24/7 and called in when individuals are transported to a hospital emergency department having survived an opiate overdose. The hours immediately after an overdose are medically risky, but they also present a unique opportunity. The AnchorED trained recovery coaches will ensure that patients and their families know that substance use disorder is a medical condition and that recovery is possible. Recovery Coaches engage with those who have survived an opiate overdose, listen and be present to answer questions patients may have about recovery supports or treatment options. These coaches also provide recovery and treatment information to family members. These same coaches offer post-discharge recovery contact and support to the revived patients for a period of weeks.

== History ==
William L. White used the term "recovery coach" in his 2006 paper "Sponsor, Recovery Coach, Addiction Counselor", but later adopted the term "peer recovery support specialist" to emphasize a community-based peer model of addiction support.

White's Recovery Management model, adapted from the Minnesota Model, includes recovery coaching (peer recovery support specialist) and was developed in 2006. Many recovery coaches use different recovery approaches adapted from the Minnesota Model. Schuyler developed a professional life coaching model for addiction recovery by blending the Minnesota Model and Harm Reduction model with the core competencies of the ICF.

Through the research of White, David Loveland, Ernest Kurtz, and Mark Saunders, and the efforts funded through Faces and Voices of Recovery, the Fayette Companies, Great Lakes Addiction Technology Transfer Center, the Chestnut Health Systems and many other universities, research on recovery coaching is progressing rapidly. The theory has been developed that recovery coaching reduces relapse by providing ongoing support developing healthy problem-solving skills and self efficacy (reaching worthwhile goals), as well as connecting with the local recovery community for additional support. In other words, recovery coaching helps the client develop the cognitive skills necessary for considering options and consequences, making clear choices, planning, and taking action toward a healthier life and recovery goals.

== Addiction recovery support groups ==
Recovery coaches encourage (but generally do not require) participation in groups such as Alcoholics Anonymous, Narcotics Anonymous, Al-Anon, or non-12-step groups such as LifeRing Secular Recovery, SMART Recovery, Recovery Dharma, Moderation Management, and Women for Sobriety. They may also work with individuals who prefer not to participate in mutual-support groups to help them develop individualized recovery plans.

== Niches within recovery coaching ==
Recovery coaches may work with individuals recovering from a variety of substance use disorders. Some specialize in providing support to specific populations, such as people re-entering the community after incarceration or family members affected by another person's substance use disorder. Peer recovery support specialists may also assist individuals in accessing health care, housing, employment, education, and other community resources that support long-term recovery.

Some recovery coaches incorporate broader life skills and goal-setting into their practice to support individuals during recovery. In addition to addressing substance use, recovery coaching may help individuals develop strategies related to employment, education, family relationships, housing, and other aspects of community reintegration and long-term recovery.

It is critically important to understand that addiction is unlike any other malady, in that, it "...exists and thrives within the sufferer's body on three completely separate but interconnected planes; the physiological, the mental/emotional, and the spiritual." Therefore, simply addressing the act/s of drinking or using is never enough as a means for sustaining long-term sobriety.

Individuals requiring a higher level of care, such as medically supervised withdrawal management or inpatient treatment, are generally referred to appropriate healthcare services. Recovery coaches may provide support before, during, or after formal treatment, but they are not a substitute for medical or behavioral healthcare.

== What recovery coaches do ==
Recovery coaches support the client in achieving and maintaining a solid foundation in recovery and building upon recovery to achieve other life goals that make recovery worthwhile. David Loveland and Michael Boyle wrote a lengthy manual on recovery coaching and how to guide an individual through creating their recovery plan. William White, preeminent scholar on addictions, worked closely with the Philadelphia community-based recovery center PRO-ACT to prepare a document outlining the "Ethical Guidelines for the Delivery of Peer-Based Recovery Support Services". These documents provide a discussion of what a recovery coach does. Also included in these guidelines are the definition of coaching roles as they relate to others in the realm of personal conduct and conduct in service relationships with the community service provider or treatment team. White's document presents a simple statement of core competencies.

== See also ==
- Drug rehabilitation
- Peer support
- Recovery approach
