= North American Board of Certified Energy Practitioners =

The North American Board of Certified Energy Practitioners (NABCEP) is a nonprofit professional certification and accreditation organization that offers both individual and company accreditation programs for photovoltaic system installers, solar heat installers, technical sales, and other renewable energy professionals throughout North America. NABCEP was officially incorporated in 2002 and its mission is to raise standards while promoting consumer and other stakeholders' confidence within the renewable energy industry.

NABCEP is a nationally recognized credentialing body formed to set competency standards for professional practitioners in the fields of renewable energy and energy efficiency. NABCEP PV Installation Professional Certification (formerly NABCEP Solar PV Installer Certification) has been accredited to the international ANSI/ISO/IEC 17024 standard for personnel certification bodies since 2007, and the NABCEP Solar Heating Installer Certification became accredited in 2013.

NABCEP has become the primary organization for solar energy professional certification in the United States and Canada. NABCEP designed an Associate Program for individuals who are interested in learning about and finding jobs within the solar field; the NABCEP PV Associate Exam allows candidates to demonstrate a basic knowledge of the fundamental principles related to PV systems and designs. NABCEP also offers certifications in:

- PV Installation Professional (PVIP) Certification
- PV Design Specialist (PVDS) Certification
- PV Installer Specialist (PVIS) Certification
- PV Commissioning & Maintenance (PVCMS) Certification
- PV Technical Sales (PVTS) Certification
- PV System Inspector (PVSI) Certification
- Solar Heating Installer (SHI) Certification
- Solar Heating System Inspector (SHSI) Certification, and
- NABCEP Company Accreditation

As of February 1, 2018, only ten companies had earned NABCEP Company Accerditation. They include:

1. Advance Solar & Energy in Fort Myers, FL
2. Apex Solar Power in Queensbury, NY
3. Bob Heinmiller Air Conditioning, Inc.in Orlando, FL
4. Pioneer Valley PhotoVoltaics Cooperative, Inc. (dba PV Squared) in Greenfield, MA
5. Renova Energy Corp. in Palm Desert, CA
6. Solar-Ray Inc. in Orlando, FL
7. Sullivan Solar Power of California Inc. in San Diego, CA
8. Synergy Solar and Electrical Systems, Inc. in Sebastopol, CA
9. Technicians For Sustainability in Tucson, AZ
10. Yes! Solar Solutions in Cary, NC

NABCEP Certification is either preferred or mandatory for solar system installations to be eligible for incentive programs in several states. In order to be eligible for state rebate funds in Minnesota, Maine, and Wisconsin, PV solar systems must be installed by a NABCEP-certified professional. California, Massachusetts, and Delaware's solar rebate programs prefer or recommend NABCEP-certified professionals. NABCEP-certification is a prerequisite for qualifying for a state solar contractor license in Utah. Specific policies and incentives can be found on DSIRE's website.

NABCEP partners with Castle Worldwide to offer its associate and certification exams at multiple sites in the United States and Canada.

NABCEP also approves training providers that are IREC accredited. The process can be long and challenging but is meant to show companies that uphold a certain consistent set of quality standards.
