= Certified Financial Planner Board of Standards =

US nonprofit organization

Certified Financial Planners Board of Standards, Inc.
- Abbreviation: CFP Board
- Founded: 1985
- Type: Non-profit
- Legal status: 501(c)(6) 501(c)(3)
- Purpose: Certification and standards-setting in the profession of financial planning in the United States
- Professional title: Certified Financial Planner professional; CFP professional
- Headquarters: Washington, DC; formerly: Denver, Colorado
- Region served: United States
- Members: 101,708 certificants (as of 11/1/2024)
- Key people: Kevin R. Keller, CEO
- Affiliations: Financial Planning Standards Board (FPSB) Foundation for Financial Planning (FFP)
- Employees: 110
- Website: www.cfp.net

Certified Financial Planner Board of Standards, Inc., is an American 501(c)(6) nonprofit organization that sets and upholds standards for financial planning. It administers Certified Financial Planner (CFP) certification, which is held by more than 100,000 people in the United States.

== History ==
CFP Board was founded in 1985 as a non-profit organization created by the College for Financial Planning, which initially created the Certified Financial Planner certification program in the early 1970s. Originally known as the International Board of Standards and Practices for Certified Financial Planners, Inc. (IBCFP), the organization was granted 501(c)(3) status by the Internal Revenue Service. IBCFP was renamed the Certified Financial Planner Board of Standards, Inc. in 1994.

In 1987, CFP Board registered the first 25 institutions to offer financial planning education programs based on an approved curriculum. Four years later, the organization introduced a comprehensive CFP Certification Examination to test individuals’ ability to integrate and apply the knowledge gained from the financial planning curriculum.

After more than 20 years of operations in Denver, CFP Board in 2007 moved its office to Washington, DC.
