= Canadian Institute of Traffic and Transportation =

The Canadian Institute of Traffic and Transportation, CITT, was founded in 1958. It is a non-profit professional development association in the supply chain and transportation logistics sector. The CITT head office is located in Toronto, Ontario.

== Membership ==
There are currently approximately 2,000 CITT-certified, undergraduate, associate, and student members located across Canada and the United States.

== Certification requirements ==
CITT candidates must complete a certification process to obtain their designation, the CCLP (CITT-Certified Logistics Professional). Earning the CCLP designation begins with at least five courses. Courses are taught by working professionals and provide practical skills training. Logistics courses are offered online and business courses are administered by academic partners.

=== Ongoing Requirements ===
To maintain designation, CITT-certified professionals earn Certification Maintenance Units (CMU's) by attending or presenting at seminars and workshops, teaching or attending formal courses, reading to stay current, and/or writing on business or industry-related topics.

== Location ==
CITT is located in Toronto, Ontario.

== Course Cost ==
Course cost varies with the number of courses required (exemptions based on previous learning are available) as well as the method of study chosen (distance education is available through CITT and classroom learning is available through specific academic institutions).

== Annual Conference ==
CITT administers an annual learning symposium in the fall, known as the Canada Logistics Conference. The venue rotates through different Canadian cities from year to year.

== Awards ==
CITT presents an annual Award of Excellence to the member who "best exemplifies leadership, innovation and notable achievements in their community." Seven academic awards are presented to members engaged in the CITT Program of Study.

== CITT Board of Directors and Local Area Councils ==
CITT is supported and governed by a volunteer Board of Directors composed of thirteen supply chain and logistics professionals as well as two internal auditors. Board meetings are convened on a regular basis in accordance with by-laws.

There are also seven CITT area councils. Councils are run by volunteer executives, and chapters are located in British Columbia, Saskatchewan, Manitoba, Quebec, Ontario, New Brunswick and Nova Scotia.
