= California Society of Municipal Finance Officers =

US professional association

- Abbreviation: CSMFO
- Formation: 1958
- Type: Nonprofit
- Purpose: Government Finance in California
- Members: California local government agencies
- Board of directors: President: Stephen Parker, City of Upland; President-Elect: Will Fuentes, City of Campbell; Past-President: Jennifer Wakeman, City of San Ramon; Alberto Preciado, City of Citrus Heights; Kyle Johnson, City of Glendora; Sara Castro, City of Tracy; Jennifer Becker, City of Burbank; Time Seufert; Daniel Buffalo, City of Ukiah; Debbie Rosales, Las Virgenes Municipal Water District
- Website: https://csmfo.org/

The California Society of Municipal Finance Officers (or CSMFO) is a professional association of state, county, and local government finance officers in California. The California Society of Municipal Finance Officers is the statewide organization serving all California municipal finance professionals, an affiliate of the nationwide Government Finance Officers Association (GFOA). Membership is open to anyone in the State of California actively engaged in government finance in any city, county, or special district.

== The Challenge to Excellence in Government Finance ==
The Chief Financial Officers Act of 1990(CFO Act) was signed into law by President George H. W. Bush. For each of 23 federal agencies, the position of chief financial officer was created. Since that time, federal efforts have been intended to improve the government's financial management and develop standards of financial performance and disclosure. Similar financial expectations exist at State and Local government levels.

The chief financial officer (CFO) of a public agency is the corporate officer primarily responsible for managing the financial risks of the business or agency. This officer is also responsible for budgeting, financial planning, record-keeping, cash flow management, higher management. communicating financial performance and forecasts to the community. The title may vary, such as finance director or treasurer, from agency to agency. The CFO typically reports to the city manager or other chief executive officer.

Financial reporting has multiple audiences, with a responsibility to citizens, taxpayers and voters to provide transparent accountability for use of public funds (taxes). Additionally, financial reporting must provide internal guidance to program managers to maintain budgetary control and to governing city councils and boards of directors to provide adequate financial policy guidelines.

The United States government in general has sought to improve the quality of financial reporting. The Government Accounting Standards Board (GASB) has a stated mission to "establish and improve standards of state and local governmental accounting and financial reporting that will result in useful information for users of financial reports and guide and educate the public, including issuers, auditors, and users of those financial reports." Pronouncements in particular have trended to incorporate more comparable elements of business-sector.

== Role of CSMFO Membership ==
Members are finance directors and treasurers of municipalities and other local government agencies, whether elected or appointed, having responsibility for collection, receipt, reporting, custody, investment or disbursement of municipal funds. Municipal funding sources are commonly property tax, sales tax, income tax, utility users tax (UUT), transient occupancy tax (hotel occupancy), and user fees such as licensing and permit fees.

Michael Genest is the Finance Director and Bill Lockyer is the Treasurer of the State of California. There are 480 California cities, 58 California counties about 3,400 Special Districts and School Districts, each with independent fiscal stewardship. Many City Treasurers are elected, and are therefore directly accountable to their constituents; the remainder are appointed either by City Council or City Manager. Finance Directors typically are appointed by the City Manager.

== Professional Standards Setting ==
Certification is a guide for municipal finance directors and treasurers to become valued administrators in local government. CSMFO encourages professional certification for public finance directors and treasurers who meet standards of education, experience and commitment to a code of ethics. CSMFO does not offer its own post-nominal professional certificate since GFOA already administers the Certified Professional Finance Officer (CPFO), CMTA offers the Certified California Municipal Treasurer (CCMT) certification program, and the Association of Government Accountants offers the Certified Government Financial Manager (CGFM) certification, requiring six hours of testing on Federal, State and Local Government Financial material.

== CSMFO Code of Ethics ==
Members are enjoined to adhere to legal, moral and professional standards of conduct.

== Training and Education in California Finance and Treasury ==
CSMFO has technical and professional committees that deal with financial issues facing government and the public. CSMFO also provides web-based technical support resources, educational material, conferences and technical publications for its members. CSMFO's annual statewide conferences provide an array of education across many topics and alternate annually between various northern and southern cities.

== Resources ==
The CSMFO website is a statewide resource for a variety of documents relevant to local government. CSMFO's library of resources includes sample RFPs, job descriptions, and a variety of documents and information relevant to local government. Categories of posted information include Accounting/Financial Reporting, Budgeting, Consultants, Investments/Cash Management, Job Descriptions, Payroll, Human Resources, Policies & Procedures, Revenue Management, RFPs/RFQs, and Technology.

== See also ==
- American Institute of Certified Public Accountants (AICPA) Private Sector Accounting
- California Municipal Treasurers Association (CMTA)
- Certified California Municipal Treasurer (CCMT)
- Certified Government Financial Manager (CGFM)
- Certified Public Accountant (CPA)
- Government Finance Officers Association (GFOA)
- Government Finance Officers Association of Texas (GFOAT)
- List of post-nominal letters
- Professional certification
