= Financial Accounting Foundation =

American regulator

- Type: Private
- Industry: Accounting
- Founded: June 30, 1972; 54 years ago in Norwalk, Connecticut, United States
- Headquarters: Norwalk, Connecticut, United States
- Key people: John Auchincloss (executive director)
- Website: accountingfoundation.org

The Financial Accounting Foundation (FAF) is located in Norwalk, Connecticut, United States. It was organized in 1972 as a non-stock, Delaware Corporation. It is an independent organization in the private sector, operating with the goal of ensuring objectivity and integrity in financial reporting standards. FAF operates four branches in its organization: the Financial Accounting Standards Board (FASB), the Governmental Accounting Standards Board (GASB), the Financial Accounting Standards Advisory Council (FASAC), and the Governmental Accounting Standards Advisory Council (GASAC).

== History ==
=== 1970s ===
In early May 1972, the 250-member governing council of the American Institute of Certified Public Accountants gathered in Boca Raton, Florida, to consider the Wheat Report by Francis M. Wheat, formerly of the SEC. The report recommended establishing new financial accounting standards. According to The New York Times, the accounting field had been under pressure after accounting-related lawsuits such as the Yale Express case of 1967 and the Continental Vending case of 1969. The Wheat Report recommended establishing a seven person Financial Accounting Standards Board (FASB) to replace the Accounting Principles Board, which had been making rules for the profession since 1959. The Wheat Report also recommended creating a Financial Accounting Foundation with nine salaried trustees to select board members of the FASB. The nine would include the "A.LC.P.A., four C.P.A.'s in public practice, two financial executives, one financial analyst and one accounting educator." The report was approved on May 2, 1972. The FAF was founded on June 30, 1972.

The nine trustees were appointed in late September, 1972, with nominations submitted by various businesses. Ralph E. Kent of Arthur Young & Co was elected president of the Financial Accounting Foundation. Kent asserted that $10 million had been pledged by accounting firms to cover part of the $15 million that would be needed to run the new program for five years. Other officers named were Thomas A. Murphy as vice president, James Don Edwards as secretary, and Thomas C. Pryor as treasurer. The Financial Accounting Foundation published its first draft of accounting rules for the FASB in October 1972.

=== 1980s-1990s ===
In 1984, the FAF created the Governmental Accounting Standards Board (GASB) to set accounting standards for local and state governments. Private entities remained under the guidelines of the FASB. According to the New York Times, the system "provoked sharp criticism" in relation to types of companies with mixed private and government ownership. Detractors argued the system made it difficult for investors and bond rating agencies to "compare the financial statements of, for example, a private college with those of a state-owned school." In 1989, the FAF voted 12 to 2 to "require government-owned utilities, hospitals, colleges and universities to base their accounting decisions" on FASB standards instead of the GASB standards. In 1988, the FAF moved from Stamford to Norwalk, Connecticut. In 1989, the FAF remained based in Norwalk, meeting also in New York.

As a private-sector trust, the FAF in the 1980s continued to oversee the FASB, which was funded with corporate money and served as a rule-making body setting the "binding accounting standards for virtually every publicly owned corporation in the United States." As of August 1985, FAF trustees continued to have voting power to decide replacements on the seven member board of the FASB.

In November 1989, the FAF voted to limit the jurisdiction of the GASB. Higher-education groups reportedly favored the change, but according to the New York Times, it also "produced a far-reaching outcry in the accounting profession and the agencies affected," particular state and local government groups, some of which began working to form a new accounting standards agency separate from the FAF. In early 1991, the FAF announced it was potentially facing a third annual deficit, and facing deficits through 1995 unless trends changed. It had shortfalls of $1.6 million in 1990, apparently due to drops in private contributions and publication sales. Shaun F. O'Mally, president of the FAF, said the deficit was not at "matter about which the public should be concerned."

The FAF agreed on an internal restructuring in July 1996. The chairman of the Securities and Exchange Commission, Arthur Levitt Jr., had recently demanded changes. Part of the deal involved the FAF agreeing to expand the foundation directors representing the public to five, rather than one. The FAF board at the time was 16 seats total. The FAF ultimately expanded that year so that half its members came from the public.

=== 2000s ===
In September 2005, the FAF leased new office space in Norwalk, Connecticut. In early 2011, the FAF cut the FASB board from seven members to five members. It had previously had seven board members from 1973 when it was founded until 2008. In late 2022, FAF headquarters continued to be Norwalk. In February 2023, the FAF launched free online access to the FASB's Accounting Standards Codification and the GASB's Governmental Accounting Research System, with previously paid-only navigation features made available to all subscribers. In response to SEC recommendations, in April 2023, FAF added features to its website for stakeholders to make complaints about the FASB and GASB's adherence to procedure.

== Standards and branches ==
The foundation is responsible for:

- Establishing and improving financial accounting and reporting standards;
- Educating constituents about those standards;
- The oversight, administration, and finances of its standard-setting Boards, the Financial Accounting Standards Board (FASB) and the Governmental Accounting Standards Board (GASB), and their Advisory Councils;
- Selecting the members of the standard-setting Boards and Advisory Councils; and
- Protecting the independence and integrity of the standard-setting process.

FAF operates four branches in its organization:

- FASB
- GASB
- The Financial Accounting Standards Advisory Council (FASAC). This branch is composed of FASB constituents and consults with FASB on issues.
- The Governmental Accounting Standards Advisory Council (GASAC). This branch is composed of GASB constituents and consults with GASB on issues.

== Board of trustees and committees ==
The FAF Board of Trustees is made up of members from constituent organizations having interest in financial reporting. These constituent organizations include:

- American Accounting Association
- American Institute of Certified Public Accountants
- CFA Institute
- Financial Executives International
- Government Finance Officers Association
- Institute of Management Accountants
- National Association of State Auditors, Comptrollers and Treasurers
- Securities Industry and Financial Markets Association

The FAF operates seven committees:

- the Executive Committee
- the Development Committee
- the Appointments and Evaluations Committee
- the Finance and Compensation Committee
- the Audit Committee
- the Standard-Setting Process Oversight Advisory Committee
- the Corporate Governance Committee

=== Executives and board members ===
There are currently five officers and fourteen trustees.

The original nine trustees were appointed in late September, 1972, with Ralph E. Kent elected FAF president. In 1990, Shaun F. O'Mally was president of the FAF, and in 1997, J. Michael Cook was in the role. FAF president and COO in June 2007 was Robert J. DeSantis. Terri Polley was named FAF CEO in 2010, and in January 2015, was both president and CEO. In February 2020, FAF appointed former acting president John Auchincloss as the foundation's executive director.

John J. Brennan was FAF chairman in late 2010. In 2016, Charles Noski was FAF chairman. After beginning to chair the FAF at the start of 2016, Noski began serving as the reappointed chairman of the FAF board of trustees in April 2019, but only to the end of the year. Edward C. Bernard was named chairman of its board of trustees in November 2022, with the three-year chairmanship beginning on January 1, 2023. He succeeded Kathleen L. Casey.

Other past executives have included:

- Manuel H. Johnson (president and chairman from 1997 to 2004)
- Teresa S. Polley (president from 2008 to 2019)

== See also ==
- List of companies based in Norwalk, Connecticut
- Generally Accepted Accounting Principles (United States)
