= State treasurer =

Executive officer of a U.S. state

In the state and territorial governments of the United States, 54 of the 56 states and territories have the executive position of treasurer. New York abolished the office of New York State Treasurer in 1926, in which the duties were transferred to the New York State Comptroller. Texas abolished the position of Texas State Treasurer in 1996, transferring the duties of that office to the Texas Comptroller of Public Accounts.

The state treasurer serves as the chief custodian of each state's treasury and as the state's head banker. Typically, they receive and deposit state monies, manages investments, and keeps track of budget surpluses and deficits. The position has powers and responsibilities similar to those of the United States Secretary of the Treasury and the Treasurer of the United States, or the chief financial officer of a corporation.

== Current state treasurers or equivalents ==
In most states, the position is a statewide elected office, usually a constitutional office (that is, provided for in the state constitution). In some states the position is appointed by the governor as a member of the governor's cabinet.

Name	State	Party	Start	Term end	Title
Young Boozer	Alabama	Republican	October 1, 2021	2026	Treasurer
Janelle Earls; Acting	Alaska	Republican	August 8, 2025	Appointed by Governor	Revenue Commissioner
Malemo Tausaga	American Samoa	Unknown	January 20, 2021	Appointed by Governor	Treasurer
Kim Yee	Arizona	Republican	January 7, 2019	2026	Treasurer
John Thurston	Arkansas	Republican	January 1, 2025	2026	Treasurer
Fiona Ma	California	Democratic	January 7, 2019	2026	Treasurer
Dave Young	Colorado	Democratic	January 8, 2019	2026	Treasurer
Erick Russell	Connecticut	Democratic	January 4, 2023	2026	Treasurer
Colleen Davis	Delaware	Democratic	January 1, 2019	2026	Treasurer
Glen Lee	District of Columbia	Unknown	June 28, 2022	Appointed by Mayor	Chief Financial Officer
Blaise Ingoglia	Florida	Republican	July 21, 2025	2026	Chief Financial Officer
Steve N. McCoy	Georgia	Unknown	August 5, 2020	Appointed by Governor	Treasurer
Marie Lizama; Acting	Guam	Unknown	November 26, 2023	Appointed by Governor	Director of Revenue and Tax
Luis Salaveria	Hawaii	Unknown	December 5, 2022	Appointed by Governor	Director of Finance
Julie Ellsworth	Idaho	Republican	January 6, 2019	2026	Treasurer
Mike Frerichs	Illinois	Democratic	January 12, 2015	2026	Treasurer
Dan Elliott	Indiana	Republican	January 1, 2023	2026	Treasurer
Roby Smith	Iowa	Republican	January 1, 2023	2026	Treasurer
Steven Johnson	Kansas	Republican	January 9, 2023	2026	Treasurer
Mark Metcalf	Kentucky	Republican	January 1, 2024	2027	Treasurer
John Fleming	Louisiana	Republican	January 8, 2024	2027	Treasurer
Joe Perry	Maine	Democratic	January 9, 2025	Elected by Legislature	Treasurer
Dereck Davis	Maryland	Democratic	December 17, 2021	Elected by Legislature	Treasurer
Deb Goldberg	Massachusetts	Democratic	January 21, 2015	2026	Treasurer and Receiver-General
Rachael Eubanks	Michigan	Unknown	January 1, 2019	Appointed by Governor	Treasurer
Erin Campbell	Minnesota	DFL	August 15, 2023	Appointed by Governor	Commissioner of Management and Budget
David McRae	Mississippi	Republican	January 14, 2020	2027	Treasurer
Vivek Malek	Missouri	Republican	January 17, 2023	2028	Treasurer
Brendan Beatty	Montana	Unknown	January 4, 2021	Appointed by Governor	Director of the Department of Revenue
Joey Spellerberg	Nebraska	Republican	November 6, 2025	2026	Treasurer
Zach Conine	Nevada	Democratic	January 7, 2019	2026	Treasurer
Monica Mezzapelle	New Hampshire	Unknown	March 27, 2020; Acting: March 27, 2020 – December 2, 2020	Elected by Legislature	Treasurer
Aaron Binder	New Jersey	Democratic	January 20, 2026	Appointed by Governor	Treasurer
Laura Montoya	New Mexico	Democratic	January 1, 2023	2026	Treasurer
Thomas DiNapoli	New York	Democratic	February 2, 2007	2026	Comptroller
Brad Briner	North Carolina	Republican	January 1, 2025	2028	Treasurer
Thomas Beadle	North Dakota	Republican	January 1, 2021	2028	Treasurer
Tracy Norita	Northern Mariana Islands	Unknown	February 1, 2023	Appointed by Governor	Finance Secretary
Robert Sprague	Ohio	Republican	January 14, 2019	2026	Treasurer
Todd Russ	Oklahoma	Republican	January 9, 2023	2026	Treasurer
Elizabeth Steiner	Oregon	Democratic	January 6, 2025	2028	Treasurer
Stacy Garrity	Pennsylvania	Republican	January 19, 2021	2028	Treasurer
Ángel Pantoja	Puerto Rico	New Progressive	January 2, 2025; Acting: January 2, 2025 – February 3, 2025	Appointed by Governor	Secretary of Treasury
James Diossa	Rhode Island	Democratic	January 3, 2023	2026	General Treasurer
Curtis Loftis	South Carolina	Republican	January 12, 2011	2026	Treasurer
Josh Haeder	South Dakota	Republican	January 5, 2019	2026	Treasurer
David Lillard	Tennessee	Republican	January 15, 2009	Elected by Legislature	Treasurer
Don Huffines; Acting	Texas	Republican	August 1, 2026	2026	Comptroller of Public Accounts
Marlo Oaks	Utah	Republican	June 29, 2021	2028	Treasurer
Mike Pieciak	Vermont	Democratic	January 5, 2023	2026	Treasurer
Kevin McCurdy	Virgin Islands	Unknown	July 18, 2023; Acting: July 18, 2023 – February 29, 2024	Appointed by Governor	Commissioner of Finance
David Richardson	Virginia	Independent	June 2, 2022	Appointed by Governor	Treasurer
Mike Pellicciotti	Washington	Democratic	January 13, 2021	2028	Treasurer
Larry Pack	West Virginia	Republican	January 3, 2025	2028	Treasurer
John Leiber	Wisconsin	Republican	January 3, 2023	2026	Treasurer
Curt Meier	Wyoming	Republican	January 7, 2019	2026	Treasurer

== See also ==
- Association of Public Treasurers of the United States and Canada
- California Municipal Treasurers Association (CMTA)
- California Society of Municipal Finance Officers (CSMFO)
- Government Finance Officers Association (GFOA)
- Government Finance Officers Association of Texas (GFOAT)
- State constitutional officer (United States)
- List of U.S. statewide elected officials
