= Other postemployment benefits =

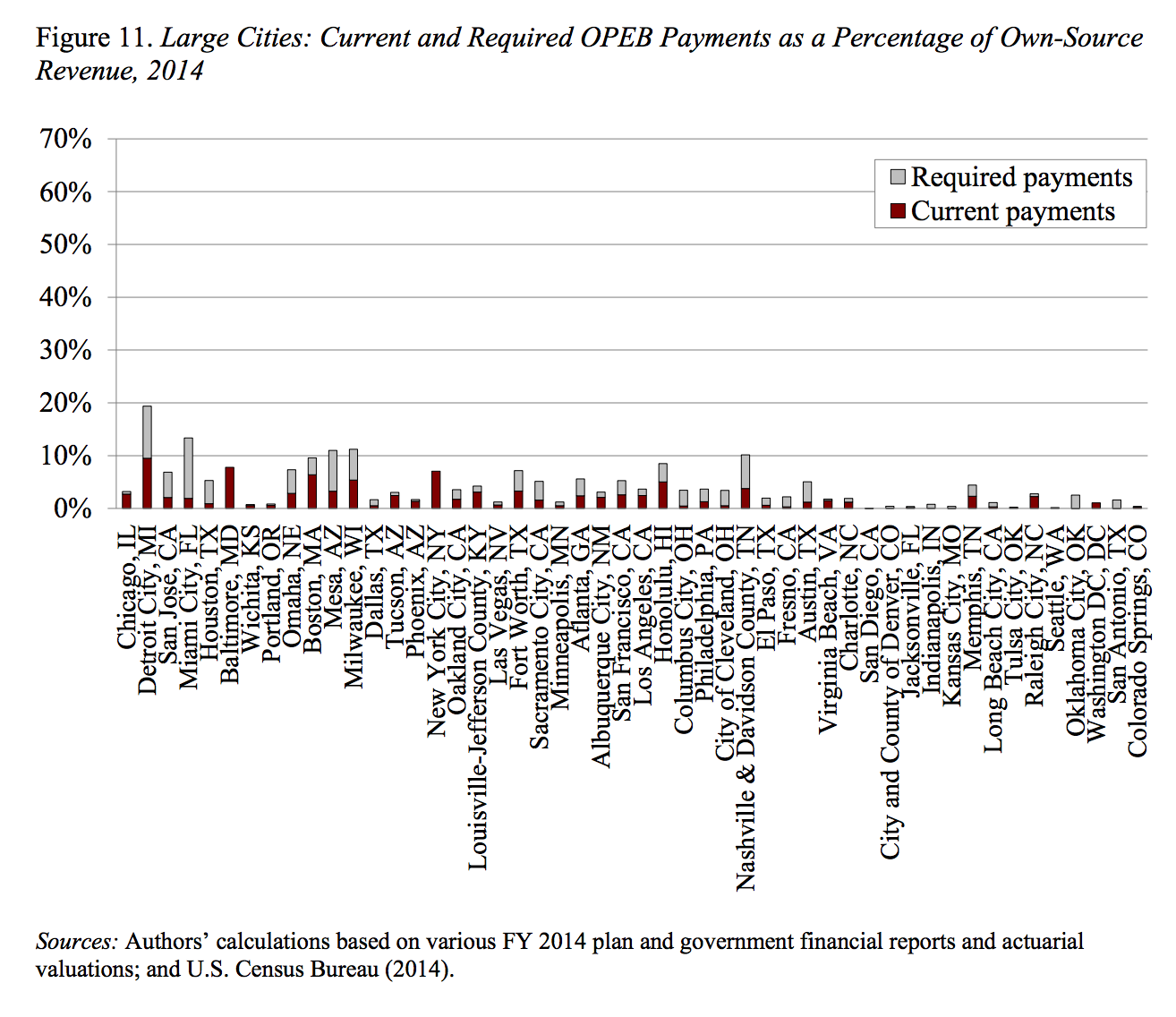
OPEB liabilities for several large counties as a percentage of their annual revenues

Other postemployment benefits (or OPEBs) is a term used in the United States to describe the benefits that an employee begins to receive at the start of their retirement. These benefits do not include the pension paid to the retired employee. "Other postemployment benefits" were originally intended to be an important source of supplemental coverage for people on Medicare. Typically this means that if employees retire before the age of 65 they can remain on their employer's health plan. Upon turning 65 they leave their employers plan for Medicare but still receive additional benefits from their employer. These benefits may include health insurance and dental, vision, prescription, or other healthcare benefits provided to eligible retirees and their beneficiaries. They also may include life insurance, disability insurance, long-term care insurance, and other benefits.

While these benefits are of great value to retirees, they have become scarcer in recent decades due to the dramatic costs they impose on employers. A recent study from the Kaiser Family Foundation found that the number of large employers offering other post employment benefits fell from 66% in 1988 to 23% in 2015. Despite their decreasing popularity in the private sector, many state and municipal employees still receive "Other postemployment benefits." According to The Pew Charitable Trust, all states except for Idaho currently offer newly hired public workers access to certain retiree health care coverage as part of their benefits package.

== Origin in the United States ==
"Other postemployment benefits" is an accounting concept created by the Governmental Accounting Standards Board (GASB) by pronouncements designed to address expenses that entities may or may not be legally bound to pay, but pay as a moral obligation.

The applicable GASB statements are:

- Statement No. 25, Financial Reporting for Defined Benefit Pension Plans and Note Disclosures for Defined Contribution Plans
- Statement No. 26, Financial Reporting for Postemployment Healthcare Plans Administered by Defined Benefit Pension Plans
- Statement No. 43, Financial Reporting for Postemployment Benefit Plans Other Than Pension Plans
- Statement No. 45, Accounting and Financial Reporting by Employers for Postemployment Benefits Other Than Pensions

GASB pronouncements apply to governmental entities, public benefit entities, public employee retirement systems, and public utilities, hospitals and other healthcare providers, and colleges and universities.

== Types of "Other postemployment benefit" plans ==
1. Defined Benefit Plan: a plan where an employer specifies the amount of benefits to be provided to the employees (and beneficiaries) after the end of their employment.

2. Defined Contribution Plan: a plan where an employer stipulates only the amounts to be contributed to plan members’ accounts for each year of active employment

== Burden on states and municipalities ==
The debate around "Other postemployment benefits" is a relatively new one since states and municipalities have only been required to report their OPEB liabilities since 2008. However, in that short time it has become clear that OPEBs represent a large financial burden and may even pose a larger problem than pension benefits themselves. In 2010, the total unfunded liability for state OPEBs was assessed to be $590 billion. In 2013 alone, OPEBs cost states $48 billion, which represented 4% of state-generated revenue. Unfunded OPEB liabilities account for up to 28% of total current unfunded pension liabilities.

Unlike traditional pensions, though, approximately 2/3 of the liabilities for "Other postemployment benefits" are at the local level. Large, progressive cities also face huge OPEB liabilities. For instance, New York City has an OPEB liability valued at $85.5 billion in the long term and costs the city $3 billion annually. A 2009 report by the Government Accountability Office uncovered $129 billion in unfunded OPEB liabilities among just 39 large local governments.

=== Decreasing OPEB liabilities ===
While cutting liabilities from "Other postemployment benefits" is difficult and often politically unpopular, it can be done through a variety of mechanisms. Some reformers are optimistic that obligations can be met with few changes to the status quo by slowing the growth of health care costs. This strategy has been moderately successful in that state OPEB liabilities decreased by 10% from 2010 to 2013 as a result of a lower growth in health care costs.

Some experts in municipal finance, however, suggest that OPEB reform be prioritized above pension reform and phased out entirely. This strategy would inevitably attract legal challenges since some states (e.g. Illinois, Florida) have clauses in their constitution that guarantee the benefits of retirees can never be changed.

== See also ==
- Governmental Accounting Standards Board
- List of GASB Statements
