= Permanent fund =

U.S. government fund for the sole benefit of the public

In the United States, a permanent fund is one of the five types of governmental fund types established by accounting standard GASB 34. Permanent funds are legally restricted to disbursing investment income only, never principal.

A fund can only be classified as a permanent fund if it is being used to pay for services for the benefit of the public, e.g. a financial endowment to pay for government or non-profit schools or libraries. A government-owned permanent fund can also be considered a sovereign wealth fund.

Some permanent funds are used to generate and disburse money to those entitled to receive cash payments by qualification, such as Alaska citizens or residents that satisfy the rules for payment from the Alaska Permanent Fund from state oil revenues.

== See also ==
- The Petroleum Fund of Norway
- Permanent School Fund - funds K–12 schools in Texas, mostly from oil and natural gas revenue.
- Alaska Permanent Fund - provides annual dividends to residents of the State of Alaska
- Wyoming Permanent Mineral Trust Fund
- Governmental Accounting Standards Board - GASB sets accounting standards for U.S. government accounting
- FASB
