= California Municipal Treasurers Association =

US professional society

- Abbreviation: CMTA
- Formation: 1959
- Legal status: Association
- Purpose: Government Treasury in California
- Location: California
- Members: Municipal Finance Directors and Treasurers
- Officers: President: Michelle Durgy, CCMT, Chief Investment Officer; San Diego County; President-Elect: Pamela Arends-King, CCMT, Finance Director; City of Tustin; Vice President: Cass Cook, Finance/Budget Manager; City of Dinuaba; Secretary: Mike Whitehead, Administrative Services Director/City Treasurer; City of Rolling Hills; Treasurer: Tracey Lovely , Investment Analyst, City of Richmond
- Affiliations: Association of Public Treasurers of the United States and Canada (APTUSC)
- Website: http://www.cmta.org

California Municipal Treasurers Association (CMTA) is the professional society of active public treasurers of California counties, cities, and special districts. It sets ethical standards for the treasury profession in state and local government in California.

The treasurer of a public agency is elected by the voting public or are appointed staff. Public treasurers are primarily responsible for managing the revenue and cash flow of the agency. This officer is also responsible for banking, collections of user fees such as utility usage and business licenses, and communicating financial performance and forecasts to the community.

== Membership role ==
Members are treasurers of municipalities and other local government agencies, whether elected or appointed, having responsibility for collection, receipt, reporting, custody, investment or disbursement of municipal funds. Municipal funding sources are commonly property tax, sales tax, income tax, utility users tax (UUT), transient occupancy tax (hotel occupancy), and user fees such as licensing and permit fees.

John Chiang is the California State Treasurer. There are 480 California cities, 58 California counties about 3,400 special districts and school districts, each with independent fiscal stewardship. Many city treasurers are elected, and are therefore directly accountable to their constituents; the remainder are appointed either by city council or city manager.

== Professional standards setting ==
CMTA offers a Certified California Municipal Treasurer (CCMT) certification program, launched in 1978. CCMT is a professional post-nominal awarded to a public treasurer who meets standards of education, experience and a stated commitment to a code of ethics. CCMT candidates must meet or exceed requirements in two areas; 50% educational standards and 50% experience and training requirements. Certification is also designed as a guide for municipal treasurers to become valued administrators in local government.

== Training and education in municipal treasury ==
CMTA has technical and professional committees that deal with issues facing treasurers, their agencies and the public. CMTA also provides web-based technical support resources, educational material, conferences and technical publications for its members. CMTA's annual statewide conferences provide an array of education across many topics and alternate annually between various northern and southern cities. The association conducts workshops to provide training and education on investments, cash management, bond sales, management skills, communications, and legislation. An on-line resource library is also maintained to support municipal treasurers.

Standing Committees Financial Leadership is furthered by engaging in efforts to assist statewide finance officers to develop the skills and capabilities necessary to enable them to become organizational leaders as well as technical experts.

Committee	Chair
CCMT Certification	Donna Mullally, CCMT, City of Irvine
Commercial Associates Liaison	Camee Lewis, De La Rosa & Co.
Education	Tracey Lovely, CCMT, City of Richmond
General Conference	Victoria Beatley, CCMT, CFO, Mesa Consolidated Water District
Legislation	Tim Lilligren, CCMT, City of Manhattan Beach
Membership and Budget	Mike Whitehead, City of Rolling Hills
Newsletter and Public Relations	Pamela Arends-King, CCMT, City of Tustin
Standing Rules and Bylaws	Mary Morris, MBA, CCMT, San Juan Water District

== California investments - Government Code ==
The objective of municipal investments is to enhance the economic status of a given agency consistent with the prudent protection of the agency’s investments. Agencies are required to create a publicly reviewed investment policy, prepared in conformance with all pertinent existing laws of the State of California including California Government Code Sections 53600, et seq. This section of California Government Code defines permitted and prohibited investments. California public treasurers must abide within the limits of this code.

== Code of Ethics ==
The following Code of Ethics, governing the professional conduct of active members of the California Municipal Treasurers Association, sets a standard of conduct in government finance:
1. To protect, preserve and maintain intact cash, investments and other assets placed in trust with the Treasurer on behalf of the residents of the community.
2. To promote principles of good government. To be dedicated to the concepts of effective and efficient local government service being provided by elected and appointed Treasurers.
3. To maintain personal conduct in such a manner as will enhance the stature of the profession and its ability to serve the public.
4. To observe the profession's technical standards and continually strive to improve the Treasurers’ level of competence.
5. To be dedicated to the highest ideals of honor, integrity, and objectivity in all public and professional relationships, and to function within existing legal guidelines.
6. To promote cooperation, good relations, bonds of friendship and mutual understanding among the membership.
7. To encourage the development of clear lines of communication between residents and elected officials, administrative officers and employees.
8. To resist encroachments upon areas of responsibility, as the Treasurer must be free to carry out official duties without interference.
9. To seek no personal advantage or gain as a result of the position occupied, or due to the commission of a questionable act.

== 2008 financial crisis ==
The worldwide credit market crisis on 2008 put states, cities and other bond-issuing government entities in jeopardy. California Treasurer Bill Lockyer and 19 municipal treasurers sought to work together, asking for an emergency Federal Reserve program to restore liquidity and help drive rates lower.

== See also ==
- AICPA
- California Society of Municipal Finance Officers (CSMFO)
- Certified Public Accountant
- GASB
- Public Finance
- State Government
- State Treasurer
- Tax
- United States Department of the Treasury
