= GASB 34 =

US Financial Accounting Standard

GASB 34 is a financial accounting standard issued by the Governmental Accounting Standards Board in the United States

GASB 34 provides a comprehensive framework for financial reporting with the objective of making annual reports easier to understand and more useful to the people who rely upon the financial condition contained therein. The most significant aspect of Statement 34 was that for the first time general infrastructure assets (such as roads, bridges and dams) were to be reported together with related depreciation or preservation costs.

In June 1999, GASB Statement 34 (or GASB 34) was published. The GASB Chairman characterized the statement as "the most significant change to occur in the history of government financial reporting."

For the valuation of infrastructure assets, the Statement authorized both a standard depreciation approach and a modified approach that relied upon asset management analysis and systems as acceptable methods. That action also authorized a combination of the two if, in the judgment of the agency, depreciation was appropriate for some asset classes while the modified approach was appropriate for others.
