= Association of Government Accountants =

American professional organization

AGA
- Formerly - Association of Government Accountants
- Formation: September 14, 1950; 76 years ago
- Legal status: Professional association
- Professional title: Certified Government Financial Manager
- Location: Alexandria, Virginia, United States
- Region served: Worldwide
- Members: ~12,000 (2026)
- Official language: English
- CEO: Mary E. Peterman
- President: Melinda J. DeCorte
- Main organ: National Governing Board (NGB)
- Website: www.agacgfm.org

AGA (formerly The Association of Government Accountants) is a professional organization for government financial management professionals. Its activities include advocacy in government financial management and working to increase government financial performance and accountability.

Based in Alexandria, Virginia, AGA was founded in 1950 and has more than 12,000 members. In addition, AGA grants the professional designation of Certified Government Financial Manager.

== History ==
In 1950, the Federal Government Accountants Association (FGAA) was founded on the initiative of Robert W. King and a group of federal accountants. In July 1975, the name was changed to the Association of Government Accountants after an overwhelming vote by its members. In March 2022, the organization further simplified its name to AGA.

In November 1990, President Bush signed into law the Chief Financial Officers Act of 1990, which had been embodied by the AGA. The act defined the concept with the creation of the Federal Financial Management Task Force in 1983.

== See also ==
- American Institute of Certified Public Accountants
- Certified Public Accountant
- List of post-nominal letters
- Professional certification
