= New Orleans Office of Inspector General =

Agency overview
- Formed: 2006
- Jurisdiction: New Orleans, Louisiana
- Agency executive: Inspector General
- Website: nolaoig.gov

The New Orleans Office of Inspector General (NOLA-OIG) is the municipal-level internal oversight office for the city government of New Orleans, Louisiana, United States. It was created in 2006 pursuant to New Orleans City Code §2-1120 for the City of New Orleans.

The main purpose of the OIG is to investigate corruption in New Orleans and to trim costs as much as possible. To that end, the OIG claims that it has identified $95 million in potential savings and generated $13.2 million from 2009 to 2016, while costing the city $29 million in that time.

Like most Offices of Inspector General, the OIG has no power directly, in that it cannot order any entity outside its own office to comply with its recommendations. Instead, it has unlimited power to request information from any governmental entity or government contractor in the city.

The OIG is overseen by an Ethics Review Board consisting of seven members, which has the power to decide the Inspector General, who then has control over the office itself. Its funding is enshrined in the city's charter as originally a .75% share of the city's general fund. Recently, the charter was changed to split the Independent Police Monitor and the Inspector General into two separate entities with a .16% and .55% share respectively, with the remaining .04% going to the Ethics Review Board.
