= Municipal treasurer =

The municipal treasurer is a position of responsibility for a municipality according to the locally prevailing laws. The treasurer of a public agency is elected by the voting public or is appointed by the municipal council or municipal manager. City treasurers are primarily responsible for managing the revenue and cash flow of the agency, banking, collection, receipt, reporting, custody, investment or disbursement of municipal funds.

== Responsibilities ==
The municipal treasurer is typically responsible for liquidity risk management, cash management, issuing and repaying debt, and interest rate risk, and oversight of pension investment management.

They also typically advise the municipal council and municipal manager, or their equivalents, on matters relating to municipal finance.

They could also have oversight of other areas, such as the purchase of insurance, and collections of user fees such as utility usage and business licenses. Municipal funding sources are commonly property tax, sales tax, income tax, utility users tax (UUT), transient occupancy tax (hotel occupancy), and user fees such as licensing and permit fees.

== Qualifications ==
Elected municipal treasurers may only be required to be of legal age, over 18, for example, meet minimum residency requirements, perhaps six months or one year, and be a registered voter. With no training requirement, citizens may have a legitimate concern and may impose post-election training requirements once in office. Some US states offer but may not require, extensive training and certification programs, such as the Certified California Municipal Treasurer.

Appointed municipal treasurers, not subject to residency requirements, are likely to be subject to competition and likely must have finance-related college degrees, prior investment experience, municipal department head experience and appropriate training and certifications.

== City Treasurer ==
In England and Wales, following the Municipal Corporations Act 1835, cities and boroughs were legally required to appoint a paid City Treasurer or Borough Treasurer to manage municipal funds, collect rates, and oversee public expenditures.

== See also ==
- Association of Public Treasurers of the United States and Canada
- California Municipal Treasurers Association
- City Treasurer of Chicago
