= List of AICPA Issues Papers =

AICPA Issues Papers new article content ...

== List of issues papers ==
The following list of AICPA Issues Papers have been compiled using the holdings of the University of Mississippi Libraries and the 2008 Technical Practice Aids section entitled "Issues papers of the Accounting Standards Division." Issues Papers were originally intended to be an evenhanded discussion of topics that needed to be "addressed or clarified by the Financial Accounting Standards Board." Issues Papers were the vehicle the AICPA's Accounting Standards Executive Committee (AcSEC) used to present emerging practice problems to the FASB and accounting practitioners. Issues Papers generally followed a standard format: (1) background, (2) analysis of current practice, (3) review of the literature, (4) statement of issues needing resolution, and (5) advisory conclusions.

While Issues Papers were never enforceable standards, they became recognized (prior to the creation of the FASB Codification in 2009) as the fifth or lowest level in the Generally Accepted Accounting Principles (United States) (GAAP) hierarchy of standards Issues Papers often offered guidance in areas too narrow for FASB's attention or when guidance was required in a more timely fashion than permitted by the formulation and issuance of a FASB statement. Issues Papers then gained a level of authority as practitioners followed their guidance and different agencies accepted their recommendations. The U.S. Securities and Exchange Commission (SEC) declared the 1984 Issues Paper, "Identification and Discussion of Certain financial Accounting and Reporting Issues Concerning LIFO Inventories," as authoritative in 1985. The method of handling stock transaction in the 1980 Issues Paper, Accounting in Consolidation for Issuances of a Subsidiary Stock, was also accepted in 1983 by the SEC as acceptable practice. The 1986 Issues Paper, Accounting for Options, provided the "first definitive professional opinion on how to account for options.

Issue Date	Official title	Status
1978 December 12	Accounting for Termination Indemnities full-text	Superseded by FASB Statement 88
1978 December 15	Accounting for Changes in Estimates full-text	
1978 December 20	Accounting for Involuntary Conversions full-text	Superseded by FASB Interpretation 30
1978 December 20	Uncertainties full-text	
1978 December 27	Reporting finance subsidiaries in consolidated financial statements full-text	
1979 January 11	Accounting for Time Paid but Not Worked full-text	Superseded by FASB Statement 43
1979 January 15	Meaning of "In Substance a Repossession or Foreclosure" and Accounting for Partial Refinancing of Troubled Real Estate Loans Under FASB Statement No. 15 full-text	Superseded by AICPA Practice Bulletin No. 7
1979 February 26	Personal Financial Statements full-text	Superseded by AICPA Personal Financial Statements Guide
1979 February 26	Project Financing Arrangements full-text	Superseded by FASB Statement No. 47
1979 April 27	Real Estate ADC Costs	Superseded by FASB Statement No. 66
1979 June 21	Accounting for Allowances for Losses on Certain Real Estate and Loans and Receivables Collateralized by Real Estate full-text	
1979 July 17	Joint Venture Accounting full-text	
1979 August 7	Accounting for Repurchase, Reverse Repurchase, Dollar Repurchase, and Dollar Reverse Repurchase Agreements for Savings and Loans full-text	incorporated into Audits of Savings Institutions
1979 October 8	Accounting by Investors for Distributions Received in Excess of Their Investment in a Joint Venture full-text	
1979 October 15	Accounting for bulk purchases of mortgages between mortgage bankers full-text	
1979 October 16	Accounting for Grants Received from Governments full-text	superseded by IASC International Accounting Standard No. 20
1979 October 30	"Push Down" Accounting full-text	
1980 January 8	Mortgage Guaranty Insurance full-text	superseded by FASB Statement No. 60
1980 February 5	Accounting for Vested Pension Benefits Existing or Arising when a Plant is Closed or a Business Segment is Discontinued full-text	superseded by FASB Statement No. 87
1980 March 20	Transfers of Receivables with Recourse full-text	superseded by FASB Statement No. 77
1980 June 20	Accounting by Lease Brokers full-text	superseded by FASB Technical Bulletin 86-2
1980 June 30	Accounting in Consolidation for Issuances of a Subsidiary Stock full-text	
1980 July 15	Accounting for the Inability to Fully Recover the Carrying Amounts of Long Lived Assets full-text	superseded by FASB Statement No. 121
1980 August 13	Intangibles in the Motor Carrier Industry full-text	superseded by FASB Statement No. 44
1980 December 10	Related Party Transactions full-text	superseded by FASB Statement No. 57
1980 December 16	Accounting for Forward Placement and Standby Commitments and Interest Rate Futures Contracts full-text	superseded by FASB Statement No. 80
1981 March 17	Accounting and reporting by health and welfare benefit plans full-text	
1981 March 17	Accounting and reporting by defined contribution plans full-text	
1981 March 17	Certain Issues That Affect Accounting for Minority Interest in Consolidated financial Statements full-text	
1981 April 10	Sales of Timesharing Interests in Real Estate full-text	superseded by FASB Statement No. 67
1981 June 25	Accounting for Installment Lending Activities of Finance Companies full-text	incorporated in Audits of Finance Companies
1981 July 13	Accounting by Agricultural Producers and Agricultural Cooperatives full-text	superseded by SOP 85-3
1981 July 16	Accounting for Joint Costs of Multipurpose Informational Materials and Activities of Nonprofit Organizations full-text	superseded by SOP 87-2
1981 August 3	Accounting for Bulk Purchases of Mortgages full-text	superseded by FASB Statement No. 65
1981 November 16	Depreciation of Income Producing Real Estate full-text	
1982 August 13	Accounting for Medical Malpractice Loss Contingencies (Asserted and Unasserted Claims) and Related Issues of Health Care Providers full-text	superseded by SOP 87-1
1982 October 14	Acceptability of "Simplified LIFO" for Financial Reporting Purposes full-text	
1982 November 1	Financial Reporting by Health Care Entities of the Proceeds of Tax Exempt Bonds and Funds Limited as to Use full-text	incorporated in Audits of Providers of Health Care Services
1982 November 4	Accounting for Employee Capital Accumulation Plans full-text	
1983 September 20	Accounting for Nonrefundable Fees of Originating or Acquiring Loans and Acquisition Costs of Loan and Insurance Activities full-text	superseded by FASB Statement No. 91
1984 February 17	Accounting for costs of Software for Sale or Lease full-text	superseded by FASB Statement No. 86
1984 March 26	Computation of Premium Deficiencies in Insurance Enterprises full-text	
1984 July 12	Accounting for Income Taxes of Stock Life Insurance Companies full-text	superseded by FASB Technical Bulletin No. 84-3
1984 October 15	Application of concepts in FASB statement of financial accounting standards no. 71 to emerging issues in the public utility industry full-text	
1984 October 31	Accounting for Key Person Life Insurance full-text	superseded by FASB Technical Bulletin No. 85-4
1984 November 5	Accounting by Stock Life Insurance Companies for Annuities, Universal Life, and related Products and Accounting for Nonguaranteed-Premium Products full-text	
1984 November 30	Identification and Discussion of Certain financial Accounting and Reporting Issues Concerning LIFO Inventories full-text	
1985 January 16	Accounting for Loss Portfolio Transfers-Letter full-text	
1985 June 28	Accounting by Health and Maintenance Organizations and Associated Entities full-text	Superseded by SOP 89-5
1985 December 11	Accounting for: no load mutual fund distribution fees full-text	
1986 February 14	Accounting for Estimated Credit Losses on Loan Portfolios full-text	incorporated in Audits of finance Companies
1986 March 6	Accounting for Options full-text	
1987 April 21	Software Revenue Recognition full-text	superseded by SOP 91-1
1987 September 9	Use of Discounting in Financial Reporting for Monetary Items with Uncertain Terms Other than Those Covered by Existing Authoritative Literature full-text	
1988 October 28	Quasi Reorganizations full-text	
