= Annual comprehensive financial report =

Set of U.S. government financial statements

An Annual Comprehensive Financial Report (ACFR), formerly called a Comprehensive Annual Financial Report (CAFR) is a set of U.S. government financial statements comprising the financial report of a state, municipal or other governmental entity that complies with the accounting requirements promulgated by the Governmental Accounting Standards Board (GASB).

The name of the report was changed in 2021 when the Government Finance Officers Association determined that, when spoken, the acronym for "Comprehensive Annual Financial Report" sounded like an offensive slur used in South Africa (see Kaffir) and decided to change the report's name.

GASB provides standards for the content of an ACFR in its annually updated publication Codification of Governmental Accounting and Financial Reporting Standards. The U.S. Federal Government adheres to standards determined by the Federal Accounting Standards Advisory Board (FASAB).

An ACFR is compiled by a state, municipal or other governmental accounting staff and audited by an external American Institute of Certified Public Accountants (AICPA) certified accounting firm utilizing GASB requirements. It is composed of three sections: Introductory, Financial and Statistical. It combines the financial information of fund accounting for both governmental, and business type accounting.

== Introductory Section ==
The Introductory Section will include unaudited information for background on the reporting entity.

- Letter of Transmittal - A letter written to the entity's governing body, by the chief financial officer. It summarizes major financial developments during the year covered.
- Organizational Chart - Showing the organization of that entity, with departmental agencies, and boards and commissions.
- List of Principal Officials - To show who is running that government.

== Financial Section ==
- Independent Auditor's Report - The auditor's opinion on whether the financial statements present the city's finances fairly. The best opinion is an unmodified - or "clean" - opinion. A qualified or adverse opinion means that there are serious problems.
- Management's Discussion and Analysis - Written by the financial staff, this section discusses the year's financial results. Major variances are explained, and simplified tables of results are presented.
- Government-Wide Financial Statements - There are two of these statements. These statements are prepared on the accrual basis.
  - Statement of Net Position - Similar to a Balance sheet. It focuses on operational accountability - how well the entity is covering costs over the long run. This statement summarizes assets, liabilities, and net position.
  - Statement of Activities - Similar to an Income statement. It first shows expenditures as offset by program revenues that are applicable to those expenditures. Revenues not directly tied to specific expenditures are shown next. The difference between all revenue and expenditure information is the change in net position.
- Since the accounting basis is different for the government-wide, and fund financials, a reconciliation of the statements is presented directly following these statements.
- Fund Financial Statements - These statements are prepared on the modified accrual basis, and use Fund accounting, which creates separate accounting pools for specific purposes. The statements include a balance sheet, and a schedule of revenues, expenditures, and changes in fund balance. A budget to actual comparison for most funds is also included.
- Notes to the Financial Statements - The Notes provide detailed explanations of various components of the financial statements. The Notes are often longer than the financial statements themselves. They explain many items including pensions, capital assets, accounting policies, contingencies and risks, interfund balances, and cash balances.
- Required Supplementary Information - Required by the GASB to appear after the notes, this includes pension information, along with post-employment benefit information.

== Statistical Section ==
Ten years of trend data is published here on a variety of topics, including brief financial information, major employers, and demographic indicators.
