= Certified Government Financial Manager =

Certified Government Financial Manager (CGFM) is a professional certification issued by the Association of Government Accountants (AGA) in the United States. It was created in 1994 to provide a professional standard of financial expertise and ethics in government and a standard by which government financial management professionals are measured. Its education, experience and ethics requirements have served to elevate the most seasoned financial professionals.

The certification requires experience, education, and examinations. Candidates must have a bachelor's degree from an accredited U.S. college or university and a minimum of two years' of professional-level experience in U.S. government financial management. The examinations consists of three 135 minute exams which must be taken within 18 months of enrolling. A CGFM must complete Continuing Professional Education (CPE) credits to maintain certification.

The curriculum of the CGFM certification covers such topics as accounting; auditing; internal controls; budgeting and financial reporting, and applies to federal, state, and local government.

== Importance ==
The Chief Financial Officers Act of 1990 (CFO Act) was signed into law by President George H. W. Bush. For each of 23 federal agencies, the position of chief financial officer was created. Since that time, federal efforts have been intended to improve the government's financial management and develop standards of financial performance and disclosure. Similar financial expectations exist at state and local government levels.

The chief financial officer (CFO) of a public agency is the corporate officer primarily responsible for managing the financial risks of the business or agency. This officer is also responsible for budgeting, financial planning, record-keeping, cash flow management, higher management communicating financial performance and forecasts to the community. The title may vary, such as finance director or treasurer, from agency to agency. The CFO typically reports to the city manager or other chief executive officer.

Financial reporting has multiple audiences, with a responsibility to citizens, taxpayers and voters to provide transparent accountability for use of public funds (taxes). Additionally, financial reporting must provide internal guidance to program managers to maintain budgetary control and to governing city councils and boards of directors to provide adequate financial policy guidelines.

The United States government in general has sought to improve the quality of financial reporting. The Governmental Accounting Standards Board (GASB) has a stated mission to "establish and improve standards of state and local governmental accounting and financial reporting that will result in useful information for users of financial reports and guide and educate the public, including issuers, auditors, and users of those financial reports." Pronouncements in particular have trended to incorporate more comparable elements of business-sector.

The need for and value of financial managers has increased. Over the past decades, a number of factors have created a rapidly changing environment for today's government financial managers. Beginning with the New York City financial crisis in the 1970s and 1980s, state and local governments began overhauling their financial management systems. In 1990, the Chief Financial Officers (CFO) act called for reforms that brought the goal of accountability to the forefront. The 1994 Bankruptcy of Orange County, California, further underscored the need for ongoing excellence and expertise in the field of municipal finance.

== Service provided by CGFMs ==
Those who may be qualified and have the skills to lead can subject themselves to peer credentialing. The Certified Government Financial Manager (CGFM) does this. A professional certification provides a degree of confidence that practitioners are adequately trained, educated and experienced to be prepared for financial challenges in the real world.

The CGFM is broad; it covers federal, state and local government financial management. It measures a wide range of knowledge and skills that a professional needs to succeed in the federal government financial environment, or to meet the unique challenges faced by state and local government financial managers.

The foundation of the CGFM are the requirements for education, experience, examination and commitment to excellence. This includes adherence to a Code of Ethics and required Continuing Professional Education (CPE).

== CGFM requirements ==
In addition to submitting an application for the CGFM program and abiding by AGA's Code of Ethics, candidates for CGFM certification must meet the following requirements:

=== Education ===
A bachelor's degree from an accredited U.S. college or university.

=== Professional experience ===
At least two years of professional-level experience in government financial management. A candidate's experience must involve U.S. government financial management at a professional level in federal, state or local government and encompass one or more of the following areas: Financial systems design, implementation, or operation; Budget formation, execution or analysis; Accounting or auditing policy and procedure development, implementation or interpretation; Accounting or auditing standards-setting; Audit of financial operations, financial statements, internal controls, or compliance with laws and regulations; Audit or evaluation of program performance or operations; Audit of contract compliance or costs; Financial report design or preparation; Financial planning or analysis; Cost or program accounting systems or asset management systems development or operation; Information resources management or electronic data processing; Government financial management training course design or instruction; Investigation of financially related fraud or criminal activities; Other experience in government financial management that the Professional Certification Board deems acceptable.

=== Examinations ===
1. The Governmental Environment

- Organization, Structure and Authority of Government (15%)
- Legally-Based Implications of the Government Financial Environment (20%)
- Government Management System (Cycle) (18%)
- Governmental Financing Process (25%)
- Concepts, Definitions and Notions of Public Accountability (10%)
- Ethics as Applied to the Governmental Environment (7%)
- Electronic Services in Government (5%)

2. Governmental Accounting, Financial Reporting and Budgeting

- General Knowledge Section (40%)
- State and Local Financial Accounting and Reporting (30%)
- Federal Financial Accounting and Reporting (30%)

3. Governmental Financial Management and Control

- Financial Management Functions (25%)
- Financial and Managerial Analysis Techniques (15%)
- Internal Controls (25%)
- Performance Measurement/Metrics/Service Efforts and Accomplishments (SEA) (15%)
- Auditing (20%)

== See also ==
- Professional certification
- Certified Public Accountant
