= Master-KAG =

Master-KAG is a German expression used for capital management companies that purely specialise on the administration of special assets. KAG stands for “Kapitalanlagegesellschaft”, which means capital management company. The KAG issues the special assets, is in charge of the fund accounting, chooses the custodian bank for storing and valuing the assets and completes the necessary administrative procedures with public authorities. In contrast to other KAGs, the Master-KAG outsources the asset management (i.e. decisions about the asset allocation) to external partners.

There are two possible ways of outsourcing the asset management. Firstly there are advisory mandates, where the external portfolio manager only gives advice to the KAG. The KAG then accepts or denies the advice on asset allocation and executes the trades at its own responsibility. Secondly there are outsourcing mandates, where the external portfolio manager makes the decisions on asset allocation and executes the trades without prior confirming with the KAG.

== History ==
As per February 2011 there is no official list of Master-KAGs in existence. The BVI (Bundesverband Deutscher Investmentgesellschaften, English: German Investment Funds Association) publishes statistics on its website which reveals the volume of managed and administrated-only funds for each KAG in Germany. KAGs with a high volume of administrated-only funds are Master-KAGs.

== Master funds ==
Master funds offer the possibility of accumulating high capital volume into one investment fund, which consists of several segments (sub funds). These segments can be managed by different fund managers.

Example: A high-net-worth investor (e.g. insurance company) wants to combine several funds into one master fund with specialised asset managers for each segment. Twenty percent of the master fund primarily consist of European equities and are allocated to segment A with asset manager X. Fifty percent of the master fund primarily consist of bonds and are allocated to segment B with asset manager Y. The remaining thirty percent of the master fund primarily consist of funds of funds and are allocated to segment C with asset manager Z.

== Special funds ==
The concept of a Master-KAG usually applies to special funds, in contrast to public funds. Special funds typically are held by institutional investors. If a KAG outsources the asset management of public funds to external managers, it is not yet categorised as a Master-KAG.

== Advantages and disadvantages ==
The main advantage of master funds tends to be a better reporting for the client. Due to the creation of all reports within one system, the client can better compare the performance of several different fund managers as if every fund manager had a different system for the creation of reports.

The main disadvantage of master funds tends to be the extra work and costs for the interfaces between the Master-KAG and several different asset managers to exchange the necessary information. Master-KAG and the external asset managers need to be up to date regarding the inventory list of the fund, therefore an additional fund accounting is needed. There are several different ways to realise the fund accounting of master-sub-constructions. One possibility is the segregation of platforms and duplicate existence of data. Another possibility is the usage of different book entry types.
