= Association of Public Treasurers of the United States and Canada =

Professional society of active public treasurers

- Abbreviation: APTUSC
- Formation: 1967
- Legal status: Association
- Purpose: Government Treasury in the United States and Canada
- Headquarters: Silver Spring, Maryland
- Members: Municipal Treasurers of United States and Canada
- Officers: President: Ernie O'Dell, CPFA, City Treasurer, City of Redondo Beach, California President-Elect: Dana Kavander, CPA, CFE, CIA, CPFA, CPFIM, Director of Finance, City of Berea, Ohio; Vice President: Henry Young III, CPFA, CPFIM; Deputy Director of Finance, Birmingham, Alabama; Treasurer: Shari Freidenrich, CPFA, CPA, CMTA, CPFIM, City Treasurer, City of Huntington Beach, California Secretary: Tumiko Rucker, CPFA, CPFIM, Town Administrator, Kiawah Island, South Carolina
- Affiliations: California Municipal Treasurers Association Maine Municipal Tax Collectors and Treasurers Association - (MMTCTA); Michigan Municipal Treasurers' Association - (MMTA); Ohio Association of Public Treasurers - (OAPT); Government Treasurers' Organization of Texas - (GTOT) Virginia Treasurers' Association – (TAV)
- Website: http://www.aptusc.org

Association of Public Treasurers of the United States and Canada (APTUSC) is the professional society of active public treasurers of counties, provinces, cities, and special districts in the United States and Canada. It sets ethical standards for the treasury profession in state and local government.

The treasurer of a public agency is elected by the voting public or are appointed staff. Public treasurers are primarily responsible for managing the revenue and cash flow of the agency. This officer is also responsible for banking, collections of user fees such as utility usage and business licenses, and communicating financial performance and forecasts to the community.

== Membership role ==
Members are treasurers of municipalities and other local government agencies, whether elected or appointed, having responsibility for collection, receipt, reporting, custody, investment or disbursement of municipal funds. Municipal funding sources are commonly property tax, sales tax, income tax, utility users tax (UUT), transient occupancy tax (hotel occupancy), and user fees such as licensing and permit fees.

Many Treasurers are elected, and are therefore directly accountable to their constituents; the remainder are appointed either by City Council or City Manager.

== Professional standards setting ==
APTUSC offers a Certified Public Finance Administrator (CPFA) certification program. CPFA is a professional post-nominal awarded to a public treasurer who meets standards of education, experience and a stated commitment to a code of ethics. CPFA candidates must meet or exceed requirements in two areas; 50% educational standards and 50% experience and training requirements. Certification is also designed as a guide for municipal treasurers to become valued administrators in local government.

== Training and education in municipal treasury ==
APTUSC has technical and professional committees that deal with issues facing treasurers, their agencies and the public. APTUSC also provides web-based technical support resources, educational material, conferences and technical publications for its members. APTUSC's annual conferences provide an array of education across many topics and are held annually between various locations. The association conducts workshops to provide training and education on investments, cash management, bond sales, management skills, communications, and legislation.

== Code of Ethics ==
The following Code of Ethics, governing the professional conduct of active members of the California Municipal Treasurers Association, sets a standard of conduct in government finance:

1. Purpose - This Code of Professional Ethics ensures a uniform adherence to the Association's longstanding policies related to legal, moral and professional standards of conduct. This code also informs the public at large as to how the Association approaches matters involving ethics. The principles set forth in this code shall govern the conduct of all members of APTUSC.
2. Fiduciary Responsibility - A member shall exercise prudence and integrity in the management of funds in their custody and in all financial transactions for which they are responsible.
3. Responsibility as Public Officials - A member shall adhere to concepts of effective and efficient local government service being provided by elected and appointed Public Treasurers. A member shall conduct himself or herself at all times in a manner which serves the public interest and maintains the good reputation of the profession. A member shall uphold the letter and spirit of the law and report violations of the law to the appropriate authorities.
4. Professional Development - A member shall observe professional technical standards and continually strive to acquire knowledge and improve levels of competence in Treasury management. A member shall strive to enhance the competence of colleagues and encourage those seeking to enter the field of Public Treasury.
5. Professional Integrity – Information - A member shall respect and protect privileged information. A member shall conduct government openly so the public may make informed judgments and hold public officials accountable. A member shall be sensitive and responsive to inquiries from the public and the media.
6. Professional Relationships - A member shall maintain the highest ideals of honor, integrity, and objectivity in all professional relationships.
7. Conflict of Interest - A member shall not seek any favor or accept any personal gain which would influence, or appear to influence, objectivity or conduct of official duties.
8. Member Misconduct - The Association shall not accept or condone unethical conduct under any circumstances. A member found by the board of directors to be in violation of any provision of this Code of Ethics shall be expelled from membership for a length of time to be determined by the Board and, if the member holds the designation of CPFA, such designation shall be revoked.

== See also ==
- California Municipal Treasurers Association (CMTA)
- GASB
- Public Finance
- State Government
- State Treasurer
- United States Department of the Treasury
