= Other comprehensive basis of accounting =

Other Comprehensive Basis of Accounting (OCBOA) in United States accounting refers to a system of accounting other than GAAP. As explained in the Journal of Accountancy, under Statement on Auditing Standards (United States) No. 62, Special Reports, an OCBOA is any one of:

- A statutory basis of accounting (for example, a basis of accounting that insurance companies use under the rules of a state insurance commission).
- Income-tax-basis financial statements.
- Cash-basis and modified-cash-basis financial statements.
- Financial statements prepared using definitive criteria having substantial support in accounting literature that the preparer applies to all material items appearing in the statements (such as the price level basis of accounting).

In situations where GAAP-basis statements aren't necessary because of loan covenants, regulatory requirements or similar circumstances, an OCBOA may just be the answer.

== See also ==
- Comparison of cash method and accrual method of accounting
