= List of Accounting Principles Board Opinions =

Accounting Principles Board Opinions, Interpretations and Recommendations were published by the Accounting Principles Board from 1962 to 1973. The board was created by American Institute of Certified Public Accountants (AICPA) in 1959 and was replaced by Financial Accounting Standards Board (FASB) in 1973. Its mission was to develop an overall conceptual framework of US generally accepted accounting principles (US GAAP). APB was the main organization setting the US GAAP and its opinions are still an important part of it. All of the Opinions have been superseded in 2009 by FASB's Accounting Standards Codification.

Opinions
No.	Title	Issue Date	Changes (note: para. stands for paragraph)
1.	New Depreciation Guidelines and Rules full-text	Nov. 1962	Amended; Parts deleted; Superseded by FASB Statement 96, para. 203(b), and FASB Statement 109, para. 286(b)
2.	Accounting for the "Investment Credit" full-text	Dec. 1962	Amended; Parts deleted or replaced
3.	The Statement of Source and Application of Funds full-text	Oct. 1963	Superseded by APB Opinion 19, para. 3
4.	Accounting for the "Investment Credit" full-text	Mar. 1964	None
5.	Reporting of Leases in Financial Statements of Lessee full-text	Sept. 1964	Amended; Parts deleted; Superseded by FASB Statement 13, para. 2
6.	Status of Accounting Research Bulletins full-text	Oct. 1965	Amended; Many parts deleted
7.	Accounting for Leases in Financial Statements of Lessors full-text	May 1966	Amended; Parts deleted; Superseded by FASB Statement 13, para. 2
8.	Accounting for the Cost of Pension Plans full-text	Nov. 1966	Amended; Parts deleted; Superseded by FASB Statement 87, para. 9
9.	Reporting the Results of Operations full-text	Dec. 1966	Amended; Many parts deleted
10.	Omnibus Opinion-1966 full-text	Dec. 1966	Amended; Many parts deleted
11.	Accounting for Income Taxes full-text	Dec. 1967	Amended; Parts deleted; Superseded by FASB Statement 96, para. 203(c), and FASB Statement 109, para. 286(c)
12.	Omnibus Opinion—1967 full-text	Dec. 1967	Amended; Parts deleted or replaced
13.	Amending Para. 6 of APB Opinion Opinion No. 9, Application to Commercial Banks full-text	Mar. 1969	None
14.	Accounting for Convertible Debt and Debt Issued with Stock Purchase Warrants full-text	Mar. 1969	None
15.	Earnings per Share full-text	May. 1969	Amended; Parts deleted or replaced; Superseded by FASB Statement 128, para. 160(a)
16.	Business Combinations full-text	Aug. 1970	Amended; Parts deleted or replaced; Superseded by FASB Statement 141, para. E1(a)
17.	Intangible Assets full-text	Aug. 1970	Amended; Parts deleted; Superseded by FASB Statement 142, para. D1(a)
18.	The Equity Method of Accounting for Investments in Common Stock full-text	Mar. 1971	Heavily amended; Parts deleted or replaced
19.	Reporting Changes in Financial Position full-text	Mar. 1971	Amended; Superseded by FASB Statement 95, para. 150
20.	Accounting Changes full-text	July. 1971	Heavily amended; Parts deleted or replaced; Superseded by FASB Statement 154, para. C1(a)
21.	Interest on Receivables and Payables full-text	Aug. 1971	Amended
22.	Disclosure of Accounting Policies full-text	Apr. 1972	Amended
23.	Accounting for Income Taxes-Special Areas full-text	Apr. 1972	Heavily amended; Parts deleted or replaced
24.	Accounting for Income Taxes—Investments in Common Stock Accounted for by the Equity Method (Other than Subsidiaries and Corporate Joint Ventures) full-text	Apr. 1972	Parts deleted; Superseded by FASB Statement 96, para. 203(d), and FASB Statement 109, para. 286(d)
25.	Accounting for Stock Issued to Employees full-text	Oct. 1972	Amended; Parts deleted or replaced; Superseded by FASB Statement 123r, para. D7
26.	Early Extinguishment of Debt full-text	Oct. 1972	Amended; Parts replaced
27.	Accounting for Lease Transactions by Manufacturer or Dealer Lessors full-text	Nov. 1972	Superseded by FASB Statement 13, para. 2
28.	Interim Financial Reporting full-text	May. 1973	Heavily amended; Parts replaced
29.	Accounting for Nonmonetary Transactions full-text	May. 1973	Amended; Parts deleted, added, or replaced
30.	Reporting the Results of Operations-Reporting the Effects of Disposal of a Segment of a Business, and Extraordinary, Unusual and Infrequently Occurring Events and Transactions full-text	June. 1973	Heavily amended; Parts deleted or replaced
31.	Disclosure of Lease Commitments by Lessees full-text	June. 1973	Superseded by FASB Statement 13, para. 2

Statements
No.	Date	Official title
1	1962 April 13	Statement by the Accounting Principles Board. See also section 9001 of the final edition of the APB Accounting Principles, Volume 2, Original Pronouncements as of June 30, 1973.
2	1967 September	Disclosure of supplemental financial information by diversified companies full-text
3	1969 June	Financial statements restated for general price-level changes full-text
4	1970 October	Basic concepts and accounting principles underlying financial statements of business enterprises full-text

Original Pronouncements and Current Text
Date	Official title
1968 May 1	APB accounting principles: volume 1: Current text as of May 1, 1968 full-text
1968 May 1	APB accounting principles: volume 2: Original pronouncements as of May 1, 1968 full-text
1969 August 1	APB accounting principles: volume 1: Current text as of August 1, 1969 full-text
1969 August 1	APB accounting principles: volume 2: Original pronouncements as of August 1, 1969 full-text
1970 September 1	APB accounting principles: volume 1: Current text as of September 1, 1970 full-text
1970 September 1	APB accounting principles: volume 2: Original pronouncements as of September 1, 1970 full-text
1971 February 1	APB accounting principles: volume 1: Current text as of February 1, 1971 full-text
1971 February 1	APB accounting principles: volume 2: Original pronouncements as of February 1, 1971 full-text
1971 December 1	APB accounting principles: volume 1: Current text as of December 1, 1971 full-text
1971 December 1	APB accounting principles: volume 2: Original pronouncements as of December 1, 1971 full-text
1972 September 1	APB accounting principles: volume 1: Current text as of September 1, 1972 full-text
1972 September 1	APB accounting principles: volume 2: Original pronouncements as of September 1, 1972 full-text
1973 June 30	APB accounting principles: volume 1: Current text as of June 30, 1973 full-text
1973 June 30	APB accounting principles: volume 2: Original pronouncements as of June 30, 1973 full-text

== Accounting Interpretations ==
The American Institute of Certified Public Accountants issued Accounting Interpretations between 1968 and November 1973, when the Financial Accounting Standards Board took over the issuing of interpretations in June 1974. The Interpretations were not considered pronouncements from the Accounting Principles Board, but Richard C. Lytle, the administrative director of the Accounting Principles Board, was responsible for their preparation. The Interpretations originally appeared in the Journal of Accountancy. For Interpretations see section 9551 of the final edition of the APB Accounting Principles, Volume 2, Original Pronouncements as of June 30, 1973. The interpretation numbers come from the Financial Accounting Board's Original Pronouncements as amended 2008/2009 Edition, volume 3. Also, consult this volume for detailed listing of amendments, deletions, and other changes to the individual interpretations prior to 2009 (when the Accounting Standards Codification was issued.) Also, consult Fasb Pre-Codification AICPA Copyrighted Standards for those Interpretations (AIN-APB 9, 18, 20, 21, 26, and 30) that were finally superseded by the Codification.

Date	Official title	Interpretation No.	Comments
1970 July	Computing earnings per share: Unofficial Accounting Interpretations of APB Opinion No. 15, Interpretations 1-101	AIN-APB15	Superseded by FAS 128
1971 March	Compensation involved in stock option and stock purchase plans: Unofficial Accounting Interpretations of Accounting Research Bulletin No. 43, Chapter 13B, Interpretation 1	AIN-ARB43, Ch 13B	Superseded by APB 25
1971 February and April	Reporting the results of operations: Unofficial Accounting Interpretations of APB Opinion No. 9, Interpretations 1 and 2	AIN-APB9	Interpretation 2 deleted by FAS 111
1972 March	Accounting for income taxes: Unofficial Accounting Interpretations of APB Opinion No. 11, Interpretation 1	AIN-APB11	Superseded by FAS 96 and 109
1970 November	Deferred compensation Contracts: Unofficial Accounting Interpretations, Interpretation No. 1	AIN-Key Man Life	Superseded by FASB Technical Bulletin 85-4
1970 December-1971 April	Business combinations: Unofficial Accounting Interpretations of APB Opinion No. 16, Interpretations 1-17	AIN-APB16	Superseded by FAS 141
1971 April; 1973 March	Intangible assets: Unofficial Accounting Interpretations of APB Opinion No. 17, Interpretations 1-2	AIN-APB17	Superseded by FAS 142
1968	Accounting for the cost of pension plans: Unofficial Accounting Interpretations of APB Opinion No. 8, Interpretations 1-28	AIN-APB8	Superseded by FAS 111
1969-1972 March	Accounting for income taxes: Accounting Interpretations of APB Opinion No. 11, Interpretations 2-25	AIN-APB11	Superseded by FAS 96 and 109
1971 September	Computing earnings per share: Accounting Interpretations of APB Opinion No. 15, Interpretation 102	AIN-APB15	Superseded by FAS 128
1971 September and November	Business combinations: Accounting Interpretations of APB Opinion No. 16, Interpretations 18-25	AIN-APB16	Superseded by FAS 141
1971 November	Accounting for leases in financial statements of lessors: Accounting Interpretations of APB Opinion No. 7, Interpretation 1	AIN-APB7	Superseded by FAS 111
1971 November-1972 February	Equity Method of Accounting for investments in common Stock: Accounting Interpretations of APB Opinion No. 18, Interpretations 1-3	AIN-APB18	Amended by FAS 96
1972 February and June	Reporting changes in financial position: Accounting Interpretations of APB Opinion No. 19, Interpretations 1-3	AIN-APB19	Superseded by FAS 95
1972 February	Accounting for the investment credit: Accounting Interpretations of APB Opinion No. 4, Interpretation 1	AIN-APB4	
1972 February	Consolidated financial statements: Accounting Interpretations of ARB No. 51, Interpretation 1	AIN-ARB51	Superseded by FAS 111
1971 December-1972 May 31	Business combinations: Accounting Interpretations of APB Opinion No. 16, Interpretations 26-36	AIN-APB16	Superseded by FAS 141
1972 March	Accounting for investment credit: Accounting Interpretations of APB Opinion No. 4, Interpretations 2-6	AIN-APB4	Interpretation 4 and 6 deleted by FAS 96; Interpretation 5 deleted by FAS 111
1972 June	Interest on receivables and payables: Accounting Interpretations of APB Opinion No. 21, Interpretation 1	AIN-APB21	
1972 November-1973 March	Business combinations: Accounting Interpretations of APB Opinion No. 16, Interpretations 37-39	AIN-APB16	Superseded by FAS 141
1973 March	Accounting changes: Unofficial Accounting Interpretations of APB Opinion No. 20, Interpretations 1-2	AIN-APB20	Superseded by FAS 128
1973 March	Accounting for income taxes—Special areas: Accounting Interpretations of APB Opinion No. 23, Interpretation 1	AIN-APB23	Superseded by FAS 96 and 109
1973 March	Early extinguishment of debt: Unofficial Accounting Interpretations of APB Opinion No. 26, Interpretation 1	AIN-APB26	Amended by FAS 111
1973 June	Accounting for stock issued to employees: Accounting Interpretations of APB Opinion No. 25, Interpretation 1	AIN-APB25	Amended by FAS 196, 111, and 123
1973 November	Disclosure of accounting policies: Accounting Interpretations of APB Opinion No. 22, Interpretation 1	AIN-APB22	Superseded by FAS 111
1973 November	Reporting the results of operations: Accounting Interpretations of APB Opinion No. 30, Interpretation 1	AIN-APB30	

== See also ==
- American Institute of Certified Public Accountants
- Financial Accounting Standards Board
- US GAAP
- AICPA Statements of Position
