= Government Finance Officers Association =

GFOA Logo

The Government Finance Officers Association (or GFOA) is a professional association of more than 30,000 state, provincial, and local government finance officers in the United States and Canada. GFOA is headquartered in downtown Chicago.

== Name ==
The original predecessor of GFOA was the National Association of Comptrollers and Accounting Officers which was formed in February 1906. Its name was changed in December 1931 to the International Association of Municipal Finance Officers. In June 1932, the name became the Municipal Finance Officers Association (MFOA). In 1973, the GFOA (then MFOA) was instrumental in the creation of the National Council on Governmental Accounting (NCGA). By the late 1970s, it was apparent that the NCGA couldn't fully do its job, due to part-time members and limited resources. Several public interest groups, including the GFOA and the National Association of State Auditors Comptrollers and Treasurers (NASACT), held public hearings to build consensus to create and fund a full-time standards-setting body. In 1984, the GFOA, NASACT, and others signed an agreement with the Financial Accounting Foundation that gave them a voice and appointments in the creation of the Governmental Accounting Standards Board(GASB). The name Government Finance Officers Association was adopted in April 1984.

== Current Activities ==
=== Consulting ===
The Research and Consulting Center also is recognized for its practitioner-focused consulting services for state and local governments. GFOA consulting services focus on business process improvement, organizational assessments, long‐term financial planning, budgeting, and planning and procurement assistance for technology projects.

GFOA's technology consulting practice was formed in 1998 to respond to GFOA members need for objective, independent guidance on procurement and implementation of enterprise resource planning (ERP) systems in advance of Y2K. As a non-profit membership organization, GFOA has no affiliation with any software or hardware vendors, and serves as an independent source of information for local governments.

Over the past 15 years, GFOA's technology consulting practice has become the market leader in assisting local governments through the process of assessing current systems, understanding the vendor marketplace, facilitating procurement of new systems, and providing detailed analysis and contract negotiation assistance to protect the best interests of governments with the purpose of reducing implementation risk. GFOA has assisted over 450 cities, counties, school districts, and special district governments with system selection, contract negotiation, and implementation readiness for ERP and other administrative systems.

=== Publications ===
GFOA maintains an extensive inventory of books, e-books, manuals, guides, and CDs on government finance topics that are available for purchase, with member discounts. GFOA is best known for its "Blue Book", titled Governmental Accounting, Auditing, and Financial Reporting (GAAFR). The GAAFR incorporates all of the guidance of the Governmental Accounting Standards Board (GASB). It offers all of the references necessary to ensure easy access to the underlying authoritative standards. Features include: a practical chapter in brief summary for each chapter; a set of exercises for each chapter (with an explanation of correct responses); a detailed index; and a comprehensive glossary.

GFOA also offers publications on budgeting, internal controls, debt management, treasury management, and other financial management topics.

Government Finance Review (GFR): Government Finance Review is the Government Finance Officers Association's bimonthly membership magazine. It publishes articles in the forefront of the public finance profession, touching on topics such as fiscal first aid, performance measurement and management, new accounting and auditing standards, strategic budgeting, groundbreaking technology for government finance, innovations in public investing and debt management, and the expanding role of the government finance officer in areas such as economic development and financial sustainability. With each issue, the magazine explores best practices in the realm of government finance, suggests solutions to questions facing public finance officers, reports the latest news in governmental accounting, examines intergovernmental affairs, and provides the latest information in the field.

=== Awards and Scholarships ===
The GFOA sponsors award programs designed to encourage sound financial reporting for financial documents including the Comprehensive annual financial report, or CAFR, and the annual budget. The group also awards an award for Excellence in government finance. Governments in both the US and Canada are encouraged to enter. GFOA also sponsors the Frank L. Greathouse Government Scholarship each year for use by a college senior preparing for a career in state or local government finance. Recently, GFOA founded a 1-year Research Fellow program for recent graduates from the University of Chicago with an interest in public finance and small government.

=== GFOA Conference ===
GFOA’s Annual Conference attracts approximately 5,000 government finance professionals and provides a forum to discuss innovative practices, learn from best practice examples, network with peers, and interact with exhibitors.

=== Training ===
GFOA provides professional development training opportunities to state, provincial, and local level government officials and other finance practitioners each year. Training courses are presented as basic, intermediate, advanced, update, or overview.

As part of a commitment to professional development, the GFOA offers a Certified Public Finance Officer (CPFO) certification program. To earn the CPFO, candidates must pass seven examinations covering: Accounting and Financial Reporting, Compensation and Benefits, Debt Management, Planning and Budgeting, Treasury and Investment Management, Procurement, and Risk Assessment. Once earned, the CPFO designation requires 30 hours of continuing professional education each year. GFOA consultants are regular trainers at these events. Additionally, GFOA's training curriculum has helped thousands of Government finance workers receive CPE credit in a variety of areas, from accounting to pension management. GFOA plans to expand the service into an online platform to provide more courses to more people.

== See also ==
- California Society of Municipal Finance Officers (CSMFO)
