= Teresa S. Polley =

Teresa S. Polley was president and chief operating officer of the Financial Accounting Foundation from 2008 to 2019. The FAF is the private, non-profit organization responsible for administration and oversight of the Financial Accounting Standards Board, the Governmental Accounting Standards Board, and their advisory councils.

== Biography ==
=== Early life and education ===
Ms. Polley earned a B.A. degree, summa cum laude, in accounting and French from Saint Francis University in Loretto, Pennsylvania.

=== Career ===
A certified public accountant in the state of Pennsylvania and a member of the American Institute of Certified Public Accountants and the Connecticut Society of Certified Public Accountants, Polley was a senior accountant with Arthur Andersen prior to joining the Financial Accounting Standards Board in 1987.

She was promoted to positions of increasing responsibility, and was instrumental in the administration and operation of its Emerging Issues Task Force and in the development of the inaugural edition of EITF Abstracts, first published in late 1987.

Polley served from 1990 to 1999 as Controller of the Financial Accounting Foundation, the independent, private-sector organization responsible for the oversight, administration and finances of the FASB, the FASAC, the Governmental Accounting Standards Board, and the Governmental Accounting Standards Advisory Council. As Controller, she was responsible for all aspects of the FAF's financial operations, including budgets, financial statement presentations, audits, payroll, tax reporting and investments.

From 2000 to 2007, she was executive director of Advisory Groups for the FASB, in which she served as the primary liaison between the Board and its constituent organizations that provide input into its decision-making processes. In August 2007, she was made interim COO of the Financial Accounting Foundation; the position was made permanent in May 2008.

Polley received a CTCPA Women's Awards Distinguished Service Award in 2022.
