= Charles Noski =

American business executive

Charles H. Noski
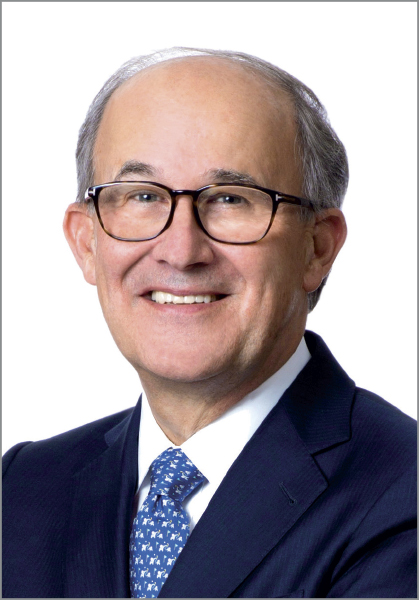
- Born: August 23, 1952 (age 74); Eureka, California
- Occupations: Retired Vice Chairman of AT&T and Bank of America
- Board member of: Booking Holdings and Hewlett Packard Enterprise
- Spouse: Lisa Jeanne Noski
- Children: 2

Charles H. Noski (born August 23, 1952, in Eureka, California) was the Chairman of the Board of Directors of Wells Fargo & Company from March 2020 to August 2021. He previously held a variety of positions, including the position of CFO at AT&T, Bank of America, and Northrop Grumman, as well as the positions of director and chairman of the audit committee of Microsoft.

== Education ==
In 1973, Noski earned a bachelor's degree in business administration from California State University, Northridge. In 1995, he returned to earn his master's degree in accounting while continuing to work full-time at Hughes Electronics. The university awarded him an honorary doctorate in 2007.

== Career ==
In 1973, Noski began his career at accounting firm Haskins & Sells (now Deloitte & Touche) where he served for 17 years and was named partner in 1983. In 1990, he joined Hughes Electronics Corporation as corporate vice president and controller. In 1992, Hughes named him corporate senior vice president and chief financial officer, in 1996 he was elected vice chairman, and he later became the company's president and chief operating officer.

From 1999 to 2002, Noski was senior executive vice president and chief financial officer of AT&T Corporation. In February 2002, he was named vice chairman of the company's board of directors. From 2003 to 2005, Noski was at Northrop Grumman Corporation as corporate vice president and chief financial officer; he was a director at the company from 2002 to 2005. In 2003, Noski was elected to the board of directors of Microsoft. In 2010, he was named executive vice president and chief financial officer of Bank of America Corporation, and became vice chairman in 2011. He retired from Bank of America in 2012 and has since served on the boards of directors of Microsoft, Avon Products, Booking Holdings Inc, Hewlett Packard Enterprise and Wells Fargo.

Noski has also been a director of Air Products & Chemicals, Automatic Data Processing, Avery Dennison, Morgan Stanley and the National Association of Corporate Directors.

Noski was chairman of the Board of Trustees of the Financial Accounting Foundation from 2016 through 2019, and is a member of the American Institute of Certified Public Accountants and Financial Executives International. He was appointed to Ernst & Young's Independent Audit Quality Committee in 2019, and is a past member and Chairman of the FASB's Financial Accounting Standards Advisory Council and a past member of the Public Company Accounting Oversight Board's Standing Advisory Group. In 2006, Mr. Noski was inducted into the inaugural class of the Financial Executives International Hall of Fame, and in 2021 was named to the Accounting Hall of Fame by the American Accounting Association.
