= GASB 45 =

GASB 45, or GASB Statement 45, is an accounting and financial reporting provision requiring government employers to measure and report the liabilities associated with (other than pension) postemployment benefits (or OPEB). Reported OPEBs may include post-retirement medical, pharmacy, dental, vision, life, long-term disability and long-term care benefits that are not associated with a pension plan. Government employers required to comply with GASB 45 include all states, towns, education boards, water districts, mosquito districts, public schools, and all other government entities that offer OPEB and report under GASB.

GASB 45 was instigated by the Governmental Accounting Standards Board (GASB) in July 2004 because of the growing concern over the potential magnitude of government employer obligations for post-employment benefits. GASB 45 will:

1. Recognize the cost of OPEB benefits in the period when services are received.
2. Provide information about the actuarial liabilities for the promised benefits.
3. Provide information useful in assessing potential demands on future cash flows.

GASB 45 applies to the financial statements issued by government employers that offer OPEB and that are subject to GASB accounting standards. GASB 45 does not apply to private employers or trusts that are established in order to pre-fund OPEB benefits and for trusts that are used as conduits to pay OPEB benefits.

== GASB 45 requirements ==
GASB 45 requires the following disclosures on financial statements:

1. Information about the OPEBs: what are the benefits, who is eligible for the benefits, how many employees and retirees are covered, and so forth.
2. The actuarially determined liability for OPEB benefits and the assets (if any) that are available to offset the liability; also information about the actuarial methods and assumptions that were used to calculate the liability.
3. The portion of the liability that must be reported as an annual accounting expense on the employer’s financial statements, and a cumulative accounting of the extent to which the plan sponsor actually makes contributions to offset its annual expense.

== Implementation ==
GASB has implemented the reporting of OPEB in three phases. The phase that applies to a plan sponsor for GASB 43 and GASB 45 implementation is identical to the phase that applied to that plan sponsor for GASB 34 implementation and is based on annual revenue reported in the first fiscal year ending after June 15, 1999. The implementation schedule for GASB 45 is:

1. Phase 1 implementation—for employers with annual revenues greater than $100 million—is for fiscal years beginning after December 15, 2006.
2. Phase 2 implementation—for employers with annual revenues between $10 million and $100 million—is for fiscal years beginning after December 15, 2007.
3. Phase 3 implementation—for employers with annual revenues less than $10 million—is for fiscal years beginning after December 15, 2008.

Smaller governments can use the Alternative Measurement Method (AMM) to comply with GASB 45 reporting requirements. The AMM was designed to provide a lower cost option for organizations with fewer than 100 plan members. Several online resources are available from credible consulting firms (e.g., Gabriel Roeder Smith, Milliman).

== OPEB liability calculations ==
Typically an actuary (or actuaries) with both pension and health experience must perform the calculations following generally accepted actuarial methods. For small plans covering fewer than 100 plan members, the plan sponsor can elect to use the alternative measurement method, a streamlined method to calculate the OPEB liability. This approach is typically less expensive and was developed by the Governmental Accounting Standards Board.

== Unfunded liability ==
There are three basic ways of treating unfunded liabilities:

- establish and fund an irrevocable trust
- pay-as-you-go
- setting aside a dedicated reserve
