= Generally Accepted Accounting Principles (United States) =

Accounting principles and rules

The Generally Accepted Accounting Principles (GAAP) (Note: Pronounced "gap") are the set of default accounting standards used by companies based in the United States.

Published and maintained by the Financial Accounting Standards Board (FASB), the Accounting Standards Codification outlines the specific and authoritative rules governing GAAP for non-governmental organizations. GAAP sources of law for government agencies and Securities and Exchange Commission (SEC) registrants are found in federal securities law and SEC directions.

Since 2008, the FASB has published U.S. GAAP in Extensible Business Reporting Language (XBRL).

== Principles ==
There are ten overarching principles of GAAP:

- Regularity
  - Accounting complies with GAAP.
- Consistency
  - Accounting remains consistent and comparable across periods.
- Sincerity
  - Accounting is objective, factual, and accurate.
- Permanence of methods
  - Accounting does not change across periods.
- Non-compensation
  - Accounting abides by the convention of disclosure, "with no prospect of debt compensation"
- Prudence
  - Accounting abides by the convention of conservatism, is "timely and realistic".
- Continuity
  - Accounting assumes going concern, that is, that the company will continue its business indefinitely. This validates the methods of asset capitalization, depreciation, and amortization. Only when liquidation is certain is this assumption not applicable.
- Periodicity
  - Accounting periods are regular and consistent.
- Materiality
  - Accounting is based on factual information, and assets are valued at historical cost rather than fair market value.
- Utmost good faith
  - Accounting is honest.

=== Accrual accounting ===
According to the revenue recognition principle, companies should record revenue when earned and not when received; cash flows do not control for the recognition of revenue. Rather, the basis of accounting is on an accrual basis rather than on a cost basis. At the same time, by the convention of conservatism, losses must be recognized when their occurrence becomes probable, whether or not they have actually occurred.

=== Matching principle ===
The matching principle states that expenses have to be matched with revenues as long as it is reasonable to do so. Expenses are recognized not when work is performed or when products are produced, but when the work or the product actually makes a contribution to revenue. Only if no connection with revenue can be established may costs be charged as expenses to the current period. This principle allows greater evaluation of actual profitability and performance.

=== Inventory ===
GAAP allows for FIFO, LIFO, and weighted inventory methods.

=== Departures ===
Under the AICPA's Code of Professional Ethics under Rule 203 – Accounting Principles, a member must depart from GAAP if following it would lead to a material misstatement on the financial statements, or otherwise be misleading. In the departure, the member must disclose, if practical, the reasons why compliance with the accounting principle would result in a misleading financial statement. Under Rule 203-1 – Departures from Established Accounting Principles, the departures are rare, and usually take place when there is new legislation, the evolution of new forms of business transactions, an unusual degree of materiality, or the existence of conflicting industry practices.

== Sources of law ==
=== Authoritative ===
The Financial Accounting Standards Board (FASB) Accounting Standards Codification is the source of authoritative GAAP to be applied by nongovernmental entities. Rules and interpretive releases of the SEC under authority of federal securities laws are also sources of authoritative GAAP for SEC registrants. In addition to the SEC's rules and interpretive releases, the SEC issues Staff Accounting Bulletins that represent practices followed by SEC staff in administering SEC disclosure requirements. The SEC also utilizes SEC Staff Announcements and Observer comments made at Emerging Issues Task Force meetings to publicly announce its views on certain accounting issues for SEC registrants.

Other organizations involved in determining United States accounting standards include the Governmental Accounting Standards Board (GASB) and Federal Accounting Standards Advisory Board (FASAB).

=== Non-authoritative ===
Examples of nonauthoritative accounting guidance and literature include the following:

- Industry practice
- FASB Concepts Statements
- American Institute of Certified Public Accountants (AICPA) Issues Papers and Technical Practice Aids
- International Financial Reporting Standards of the International Accounting Standards Board
- Professional and academic literature, including accounting textbooks, handbooks, and articles.

Influential organizations include the Government Finance Officers Association (GFOA), American Accounting Association, Institute of Management Accountants, and Financial Executives Institute.

==== Accounting standards updates ====
The FASB issues periodic non-authoritative Accounting Standards Updates (ASU) to communicate changes to the FASB Codification, including changes to non-authoritative SEC content. Each ASU explains specific amendments, reasons and background information, and the timing of the change.

The FASB also currently publishes the following:

- Technical Bulletins or Staff Positions, guidelines on applying standards, interpretations, and opinions. Usually solve some very specific accounting issue that will not have a significant, lasting effect or respond to questions from practitioners.
- Exposure Documents, where the FASB issues Exposure Documents to solicit an ASU to communicate changes to the FASB Codification, including changes to non-authoritative SEC content.

== Financial Accounting Standards Board ==
=== History ===
Accounting standards are currently set by the Financial Accounting Standards Board and were historically set by the American Institute of Certified Public Accountants (AICPA), subject to U.S. Securities and Exchange Commission (SEC) regulations. Auditors took the leading role in developing GAAP for business enterprises.

The United States Securities and Exchange Commission was created as a result of the Great Depression. At that time, there was no organization setting accounting standards. The SEC encouraged the establishment of private standard-setting bodies through the AICPA and later the FASB, believing that the private sector had the proper knowledge, resources, and talents.

In 1939, urged by the SEC, the AICPA appointed the Committee on Accounting Procedure (CAP). During 1939 to 1959, CAP issued 51 Accounting Research Bulletins that dealt with a variety of timely accounting problems. However, this problem-by-problem approach failed to develop the much needed structured body of accounting principles. Thus, in 1959, the AICPA created the Accounting Principles Board (APB), whose mission it was to develop an overall conceptual framework. It issued 31 opinions until it was dissolved in 1973.

Realizing the need to reform the APB, leaders in the accounting profession appointed a Study Group on the Establishment of Accounting Principles (commonly known as the Wheat Committee). This group determined that the APB must be dissolved and a new standard-setting structure created.

=== Organisational structure ===
In 1973, the APB was replaced by the Financial Accounting Standards Board under the supervision of the Financial Accounting Foundation with the Financial Accounting Standards Advisory Council serving to advise and provide input on the accounting standards.

After the creation of the FASB, the AICPA established the Accounting Standards Executive Committee (AcSEC). It currently publishes Audit and Accounting Guidelines that summarize the accounting practices of specific industries and provide specific guidance on matters; Statements of Position that provide guidance on financial reporting topics; and Practice Bulletins that indicate the AcSEC's views on narrow financial reporting issues.

In 1984, the FASB created the Emerging Issues Task Force (EITF). The mission of the EITF is to "assist the FASB in improving financial reporting through the timely identification, discussion, and resolution of financial accounting issues within the framework of the FASB Accounting Standards Codification."

=== Accounting Standards Codification ===
In 2008, the FASB issued the FASB Accounting Standards Codification, which reorganized the thousands of U.S. GAAP pronouncements into roughly 90 accounting topics. It also includes relevant Securities and Exchange Commission (SEC), guidance that follows the same topical structure in separate sections in the Codification. All existing accounting standards documents prior to 2009 have superseded.

== International Financial Reporting Standards ==
In 2006, the FASB began working with the International Accounting Standards Board (IASB) to reduce or eliminate the differences between U.S. GAAP and the International Financial Reporting Standards (IFRS), known as the IASB-FASB convergence project. The scope of the overall IASB-FASB convergence project has evolved over time. The IASB and FASB issued converged standards for accounting topics including Business combinations (2008), Consolidation (2011), Fair value measurement (2011), and Revenue recognition (2014). Other convergence projects have been discontinued. As of 2022, the convergence project is coming to an end and no new projects will be added to the agenda.

In 2008, the Securities and Exchange Commission issued a preliminary "roadmap" that indicated it was considering whether to adopt or allow domestic issuers to use IFRS instead of U.S. GAAP. In 2010, the SEC expressed their aim to fully adopt International Financial Reporting Standards in the U.S. by 2014. However, standards under IFRS differ considerably from U.S. GAAP, so progress was slow and uncertain. In 2017, the SEC has acknowledged that there is no longer a push to move more U.S companies to IFRS, so the two sets of standards will "continue to coexist" for the foreseeable future.

== See also ==
- Fin 48
- International Financial Reporting Standards
- Other comprehensive basis of accounting
- Philosophy of accounting
- Statutory accounting principles for U.S. insurance companies
