= Fin 48 =

US accounting rule

FIN 48 (mostly codified at ASC 740-10) is an official interpretation of United States accounting rules that requires businesses to analyze and disclose income tax risks. It was effective in 2007 for publicly traded entities, and is now effective for all entities adhering to US GAAP. A business may recognize an income tax benefit only if it is more likely than not that the benefit will be sustained. The amount of benefit recognized is based on relative probable outcomes.

== Background and concept ==
Income for financial statements may differ from taxable income for many valid reasons. U.S. Generally Accepted Accounting Principles have long required that income tax be accrued for all events recognized for financial reporting purposes. The tax must be accrued if the liability is probable of assertion and can be determined with reasonable accuracy. The tax must be recognized on all worldwide income of the business that may eventually be taxed. Credits expected to be claimed may reduce this tax. Certain limited exceptions apply. Thus, the total income tax of a U.S. company is generally the U.S. Federal income tax rate times book income, plus state and foreign taxes, less credits to be claimed presently or in the future. This tax expense is recorded as a combination of taxes currently payable and deferred tax assets and liabilities.

In 2006, the Financial Accounting Standards Board issued FASB Interpretation No. 48 on the above rules. Under FIN 48, businesses must analyze all tax positions that are less than certain. Only those positions that are more likely than not to produce benefit can be recognized in accruing tax. This is known as the recognition step. The likely outcomes of recognized positions are then computed and assigned probabilities. The most favorable set of outcomes that achieves 50% probability is then recognized. This is known as the measurement step. The business must then record tax expense or benefit, liabilities, and assets, as so measured.

Tax positions requiring analysis include all aspects of tax returns, including whether tax returns are filed in a jurisdiction. Further, businesses must accrue and disclose the effect of interest and penalties as part of the FIN 48 analysis.

== Recognition ==
Income tax expense, just as any other expense, must be generally recognized when income is earned. Credits or other items that reduce this tax are recognized only if it is more likely than not that the reductions will be sustained by tax authorities. FIN 48 clarifies several aspects of this process:

- Analysis is at the "unit of account" rather than in aggregate
- The "more likely than not" standard applies at this level
- It is presumed that all positions will be examined, and tax authorities will have full knowledge of all relevant information
- Whether a position can be sustained is based solely on the technical merits of the position

The level of detail of the analysis (unit of account) depends on how the business keeps its records, presents its financial statements, and deals with tax authorities. This may vary from business to business, and may change over time. Further, materiality is determined at the unit of account level.

One key clarification is the presumption of examination of all positions by knowledgeable tax authorities and a resolution of disputes over those positions solely on the technical merits of each position. All relevant tax law is to be considered for the individual position. Positions that are not technically correct are allowed only where there is widely understood administrative practice allowing the position. Thus, for example, a position would not be acceptable merely because an Internal Revenue Service agent allowed it in a previous year.

== Measurement ==
If it is more likely than not that a position will be sustained, then the effect of the position must be measured. Measurement is a three-step process:

- Determine possible outcomes of each position,
- Determine the likelihood of such outcome, and
- Determine the outcome that is most favorable with a cumulative likelihood of more than 50%.

For example, assume a position exists which is more likely than not to be sustained at least in part. Management determines that it is 25% likely that $100 of benefit will be sustained, and 30% likely that $75 of benefit will be sustained. The business must accrue only $75 of benefit.

Positions that are highly certain of full recognition may require very limited analysis.

== Disclosure ==
In addition to accruing the tax, FIN 48 requires disclosures in footnotes to the financial statements. Year end statements must include:

- A tabular reconciliation of unrecognized tax benefits,
- The total amount of unrecognized tax benefits that, if recognized, would affect the effective tax rate,
- Total interest and penalties recognized in the analysis,
- Unrecognized tax benefits that may significantly change within 12 months of the financial statements, and
- A description of tax years that remain subject to examination, by major applicable tax jurisdiction.

== Impact on Acquisitions and Dispositions of Businesses ==
Parties involved in disposition of a business to US publicly traded companies need to take into account the potential that FIN 48 disclosures might alert relevant tax authorities to aggressive tax positions taken by the business. This may be of particular concern in countries such as Brazil with complex tax legislation. .
