= Fund accounting =

Accounting system used for special reporting requirements

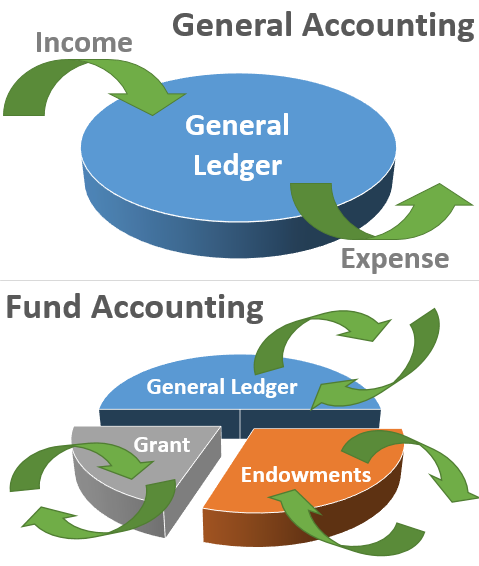
Diagram demonstrating the difference between general and fund accounting

Fund accounting is an accounting system for recording resources whose use has been limited by the donor, grant authority, governing agency, or other individuals or organisations or by law. It emphasizes accountability rather than profitability, and is used by nonprofit organizations and by governments. In this method, a fund consists of a self-balancing set of accounts and each are reported as either unrestricted, temporarily restricted or permanently restricted based on the provider-imposed restrictions.

The label fund accounting has also been applied to investment accounting, portfolio accounting or securities accounting – all synonyms describing the process of accounting for a portfolio of investments such as securities, commodities and/or real estate held in an investment fund such as a mutual fund or hedge fund. Investment accounting, however, is a different system, unrelated to government and nonprofit fund accounting.

== Overview ==
Nonprofit organizations and government agencies have special requirements to show, in financial statements and reports, how money is spent, rather than how much profit was earned. Unlike profit oriented businesses, which use a single set of self-balancing accounts (or general ledger), nonprofits can have more than one general ledger (or fund), depending on their financial reporting requirements. An accountant for such an entity must be able to produce reports detailing the expenditures and revenues for each of the organization's individual funds, and reports that summarize the organization's financial activities across all of its funds.

Fund accounting distinguishes between two primary classes of fund.: those funds that have an unrestricted use, that can be spent for any purposes by the organization, and those that have a restricted use. The reason for the restriction can be for a number of different reasons. Examples include legal requirements, where the moneys can only be lawfully used for a specific purpose, or a restriction imposed by the donor or provider. These donor/provider restrictions are usually communicated in writing and may be found in the terms of an agreement, government grant, will or gift.

When using the fund accounting method, an organization is able to therefore separate the financial resources between those immediately available for ongoing operations and those intended for a donor specified reason. This also provides an audit trail that all moneys have been spent for their intended purpose and thereby released from the restriction.

An example may be a local school system in the United States. It receives a grant from its state government to support a new special education initiative, another grant from the federal government for a school lunch program, and an annuity to award teachers working on research projects. At periodic intervals, the school system needs to generate a report to the state about the special education program, a report to a federal agency about the school lunch program, and a report to another authority about the research program. Each of these programs has its own unique reporting requirements, so the school system needs a method to separately identify the related revenues and expenditures. This is done by establishing separate funds, each with its own chart of accounts.

== Nonprofit organizations ==
Nonprofit organization's finances are broken into two primary categories, unrestricted and restricted funds. The number of funds in each category can change over time and are determined by the restrictions and reporting requirements by donors, board, or fund providers.

Unrestricted funds are, as their name suggests, unrestricted and therefore organizations do not necessarily need more than a single General Fund, however many larger organizations use several to help them account for the unrestricted resources. Unrestricted funds may include:

- General fund – This is the minimum fund needed for unrestricted resources and relates to current as well as non-current assets and related liabilities which can be used at the discretion of the organisation's governing board.
- Designated fund – assets which have been assigned to a specific purpose by the organisation's governing board but are still unrestricted as the board can cancel the desired use.
- Trading funds – Many large non-profit organisations now have shops and other outlets where they raise funds from selling goods and services. The profits from these are then used for the purpose of the organisations.
- Plant (Land, building and equipment) fund – Some organizations hold their non-current assets and related liabilities in a separate fund from the current assets.
- Current fund – unrestricted – If the organization holds his non-current assets in a plant fund then this is used to account for current assets that can be used at the discretion of the organization's governing board.

Restricted funds may include:

- Endowment funds – permanent are used to account for the principal amount of gifts or grants the organization is required, by agreement with the donor, to maintain intact in perpetuity or until a specific future date/event or has been used for the purpose for which it was given.
- Endowment funds – temporary are similar to permanent endowment funds except that at a future time or after a specified future event the endowment become available for unrestricted or purpose-restricted use by the organization
- Annuity and Life-Income Funds are resources provided by donors where the organization has a beneficial interest but is not the sole beneficiary. These may include charitable gift annuities or life income funds.
- Agency or Custodian funds are held to account for resources before they are disbursed according to the donor's instructions. The organisation has little or no discretion over the use of these resources and always equal liabilities in agency accounts.
- Current funds – restricted are current assets subject to restrictions assigned by donors or grantors.

=== Accounting basis and financial reporting ===
Like profit-making organizations, nonprofits and governments will produce Consolidated Financial Statements. These are generated in line with the reporting requirements in the country they are based or if they are large enough they may produce them under International Financial Reporting Standards (IFRS), an example of this is the UK based charity Oxfam. If the organization is small it may use a cash basis accounting, but larger ones generally use accrual basis accounting for their funds.

Nonprofit organizations in the United States have prepared their financial statements using Financial Accounting Standards Board (FASB) guidance since 1993. The financial reporting standards are primarily contained in FAS117 and FIN43. FASB issued a major update in 2016 that changed reporting net assets from three primary categories to two categories, restricted and unrestricted funds and how these are represented on financial statements.

Nonprofit and governments use the same four standard financial statements as profit-making organizations:

- Statement of financial activities or statement of support, revenue and expenses. This statement resembles the income statement of a business, but may use terms like excess or deficit rather than profit or loss. It shows the net results, by each fund, of the organization's activities during the fiscal year reported. The excess or deficit is shown as a change in fund balances, similar to an increase or decrease in owner's equity.
- Statement of financial position or balance sheet. Similar to the balance sheet of a business, this statement lists the value of assets held and debts owed by the organization at the end of the reporting period.
- Statement of changes in equity – just as for profit-making organizations, this shows the change in the organization equity over the year. Under IFRS the nonprofit organization can choose if it wants to produce this statement or not; some do, and some do not.
- Statement of cash flows identifies the sources of cash flowing into the organization and the uses of cash flowing out during the reported fiscal year.

In the United States there may also be a separate Statement of functional expenses which distributes each expense of the organization into amounts related to the organization's various functions. These functions are segregated into two broad categories: program services and supporting services. Program services are the mission-related activities performed by the organization. Non-program supporting services include the costs of fund-raising events, management and general administration. This is a required section of the Form 990 that is an annual informational return required by the Internal Revenue Service for nonprofit organizations.

== United Kingdom governmental system ==
The United Kingdom government has the following funds:

- Consolidated Fund is the fund where all date-to-day revenues and expenses of the government are accounted. Each of the devolved governments also have a consolidated fund.
- Trading fund is a government organisation which has been established as such by means of a trading fund order.
- The National Loans Fund is the government's main borrowing and lending account. it is closely linked to the consolidated fund, which is balanced daily by means of a transfer to, or from, the national loans fund.
- The Exchange Equalisation Account is the government fund holding the UK's reserves of foreign currencies, gold, and special drawing rights. It can be used to manage the value of the pound sterling on international markets.
- National Insurance Funds are accounts which holds the contributions of the National Insurance Scheme.
- The Contingencies Fund is an account which may be used for urgent expenditure in anticipation that the money will be approved by Parliament, or for small payments that were not included in the year's budget estimates.

=== Accounting basis and financial reporting ===
The United Kingdom government produces the financial statements called the Whole of Government Accounts. They are produced using the annual basis and generated under the International Financial Reporting Standards like any other large organisation.

== United States governmental system ==
=== State and local government funds ===
State and local governments use three broad categories of funds: governmental funds, proprietary funds and fiduciary funds.

Governmental funds include the following.

- General fund. This fund is used to account for general operations and activities not requiring the use of other funds.
- Special revenue (or special) funds are required to account for the use of revenue earmarked by law for a particular purpose. An example would be a special revenue fund to record state and federal fuel tax revenues, since by federal and state law the tax revenue can only be spent on transportation uses.
- Capital projects funds are used to account for the construction or acquisition of fixed assets, such as buildings, equipment and roads. Depending on its use, a fixed asset may instead be financed by a special revenue fund or a proprietary fund. A capital project fund exists only until completion of the project. Fixed assets acquired and long-term debts incurred by a capital project are assigned to the government's General Fixed Assets and Long-Term Debts.
- Debt service funds are used to account for money that will be used to pay the interest and principal of long-term debts. Bonds used by a government to finance major construction projects, to be paid by tax levies over a period of years, require a debt service fund (sometimes titled as "interest and sinking fund") to account for their repayment. The debts of permanent and proprietary funds are serviced within those funds, rather than by a separate debt service fund. As with capital project funds, once the debt has been retired, the fund ceases to exist.
- Permanent funds should be used to report resources that are legally restricted to the extent that only earnings, and not principal, may be used for purposes that support the reporting government's programs—that is, for the benefit of the government or its citizenry.

Proprietary funds include the following.

- Internal service funds are used for operations serving other funds or departments within a government on a cost-reimbursement basis. A printing shop, which takes orders for booklets and forms from other offices and is reimbursed for the cost of each order, would be a suitable application for an internal service fund.
- Enterprise funds are used for services provided to the public on a user charge basis, similar to the operation of a commercial enterprise. Water and sewage utilities are common examples of government enterprises.

Fiduciary funds are used to account for assets held in trust by the government for the benefit of individuals or other entities. An example would be the employee pension fund, created by the State of Maryland, to provide retirement benefits for its employees. Financial statements may further distinguish fiduciary funds as either trust or agency funds; a trust fund generally exists for a longer period of time than an agency fund.

==== Fixed assets and long-term debts ====
State and local governments have two other groups of self-balancing accounts which are not considered funds: general fixed assets and general long-term debts. These assets and liabilities belong to the government entity as a whole, rather than any specific fund. Although general fixed assets would be part of government-wide financial statements (reporting the entity as a whole), they are not reported in governmental fund statements. Fixed assets and long-term liabilities assigned to a specific enterprise fund are referred to as fund fixed assets and fund long-term liabilities.

==== Accounting basis ====
The accrual basis of accounting used by most businesses requires revenue to be recognized when it is earned and expenses to be recognized when the related benefit is received. Revenues may actually be received during a later period, while expenses may be paid during an earlier or later period. (Cash basis accounting, used by some small businesses, recognizes revenue when received and expenses when paid.)

Governmental funds, which are not concerned about profitability, usually rely on a modified accrual basis. This involves recognizing revenue when it becomes both available and measurable, rather than when it is earned. Expenditures, a term preferred over expenses for modified accrual accounting, are recognized when the related liability is incurred. Expenditures also include purchases of capital assets, and repayments of debt, which are not considered expenses in business accounting.

Proprietary funds, used for business-like activities, usually operate on an accrual basis. Governmental accountants sometimes refer to the accrual basis as "full accrual" to distinguish it from modified accrual basis accounting.

The accounting basis applied to fiduciary funds depends upon the needs of a specific fund. If the trust involves a business-like operation, accrual basis accounting would be appropriate to show the fund's profitability. Accrual basis is also appropriate for trust funds using interest and dividends from invested principle amounts to pay for supported programs, because the profitability of those investments would be important.

==== Financial reporting ====
State and local governments report the results of their annual operations in an annual comprehensive financial report (ACFR), the equivalent of a business's financial statements. An ACFR includes a single set of government-wide statements, for the government entity as a whole, and individual fund statements. The Governmental Accounting Standards Board establishes standards for ACFR preparation.

Governments do not use the terms profit and loss to describe the net results of their operations. The difference between revenues and expenditures during a year is either a surplus or a deficit. Since making a profit is not the purpose of a government, a significant surplus generally means a choice between tax cuts or spending increases. A significant deficit will result in spending cuts or borrowing. Ideally, surpluses and deficits should be small.

=== Federal government funds ===
Federal government accounting uses two broad groups of funds: the federal funds group and the trust funds group.

==== Federal funds group ====
- General fund. Technically, there is just one general fund, under the control of the United States Treasury Department. However, each federal agency maintains its own self-balancing set of accounts. The general fund is used to account for receipts and payments that do not belong to another fund.
- Special funds are similar to the special revenue funds used by state and local governments, earmarked for a specific purpose (other than business-like activities).
- Revolving funds are similar to the Proprietary funds used by state and local governments for business-like activities. The term, revolving, means that it conducts a continuing cycle of activity. There are two types of revolving funds in the Federal Funds Group: public enterprise funds and intragovernmental revolving funds.
  - Public enterprise funds are similar to the enterprise funds used by state and local governments for business-like activities conducted primarily with the public. The Postal Service Fund is an example of a public enterprise fund.
  - Intragovernmental revolving funds are similar to the internal service funds used by state and local governments for business-like activities conducted within the federal government.

==== Trust funds group ====
- Trust funds are earmarked for specific programs and purposes in accordance with a statute that designates the fund as a trust. Its statutory designation distinguishes the fund as a trust rather than a special fund. The Highway Trust Fund is an example of trust funds.
- Trust Revolving Funds are business-like activities, designated by statute as trust funds. They are, otherwise, identical to public enterprise revolving funds.
- Deposit funds are similar to the agency funds used by state and local governments for assets belonging to individuals and other entities, held temporarily by the government. State income taxes withheld from a federal government employee's pay, not yet paid to the state, are an example of deposit funds.

==== Accounting basis and financial reporting ====
The United States government uses accrual basis accounting for all of its funds. Its consolidated annual financial report uses two indicators to measure financial health: unified budget deficit and net operating (cost)/revenue.

The unified budget deficit, a cash-basis measurement, is the equivalent of a checkbook balance. This indicator does not consider long-term consequences, but has historically been the focus of budget reporting by the media. Except for the unified budget deficit, the federal government's financial statements rely on accrual basis accounting.

Net operating (cost)/revenue, an accrual basis measurement, is calculated in the "Statements of Operations and Changes in Net Position" by comparing revenues with costs. The federal government's net operating (cost)/revenue is comparable with the net income/(loss) reported on an income statement by a business, or the surplus/(deficit) reported by state and local governments.

== Fund accounting fiscal cycle (fictitious example) ==
The following is a simplified example of the fiscal cycle for the general fund of the City of Tuscany, a fictitious city government.

=== Opening entries ===
The fiscal cycle begins with the approval of a budget by the mayor and city council of the City of Tuscany. For Fiscal Year 2009, which began on July 1, 2008, the Mayor's Office estimated general fund revenues of $35 million from property taxes, state grants, parking fines and other sources. The estimate was recorded in the fund's general ledger with a debit to estimated revenues and a credit to fund balance.

	Ledger account	Debit	Credit
1	Estimated revenues	$35,000,000	
	Fund balance		$35,000,000

An appropriation was approved by the city council, authorizing the city to spend $34 million from the general fund. The appropriation was recorded in fund's general ledger with a debit to fund balance and a credit to appropriations.

	Ledger account	Debit	Credit
2	Fund balance	$34,000,000	
	Appropriations		$34,000,000

In subsidiary ledgers, the appropriation would be divided into smaller amounts authorized for various departments and programs, such as:

Fire department	$5,000,000
Police department	$5,000,000
Schools	$10,000,000
Public works	$6,000,000
Transportation	$4,000,000
Mayor's office	$4,000,000

The complexity of an appropriation depends upon the city council's preferences; real-world appropriations can list hundreds of line item amounts. An appropriation is the legal authority for spending given by the city council to the various agencies of the city government. In the example above, the city can spend as much as $34 million, but smaller appropriation limits have also been established for individual programs and departments.

=== Recording revenues ===
During Fiscal Year 2009, the city assessed property owners a total of $37 million for property taxes. However, the Mayor's Office expects $1 million of this assessment to be difficult or impossible to collect. Revenues of $36 million were recognized, because this portion of the assessment was available and measurable within the current period.

	Ledger account	Debit	Credit
3	Taxes receivable	$37,000,000	
	Estimated uncollectible taxes		$1,000,000
	Revenues		$36,000,000

=== Payroll expenditures ===
The city spent a total of $30 million on its employee payroll, including various taxes, benefits and employee withholding. A portion of the payroll taxes will be paid in the next fiscal period, but modified accrual accounting requires the expenditure to be recorded during the period the liability was incurred.

	Ledger account	Debit	Credit
4	Expenditures	$30,000,000	
	Wages payable		$20,000,000
	Taxes payable		$5,000,000
	Benefits payable		$5,000,000

=== Other expenditures ===
The Public Works Department spent $1 million on supplies and services for maintaining city streets.

	Ledger account	Debit	Credit
5	Expenditures	$1,000,000	
	Vouchers payable		$1,000,000

=== Closing entries ===
At the end of the fiscal year, the actual revenues of $36 million were compared with the estimate of $35 million. The $1 million difference was recorded as a credit to the fund balance.

	Ledger account	Debit	Credit
6	Revenues	$36,000,000	
	Estimated revenues		$35,000,000
	Fund balance		$1,000,000

The city spent $31 million of its $34 million appropriation. A credit of $3 million was applied to the fund balance for the unspent amount.

	Ledger account	Debit	Credit
7	Appropriations	$34,000,000	
	Expenditures		$31,000,000
	Fund balance		$3,000,000

When the current fiscal period ended, its appropriation expired. The balance remaining in the general fund at that time is considered unexpended. City government agencies are not allowed to spend the unexpended balance, even if their expenditures during the now-ended fiscal period were less than their share of the expired appropriation. A new appropriation is necessary to authorize spending in the next fiscal period. (Liabilities incurred at the end of the fiscal period for goods and services ordered, but not yet received, are usually considered expended, allowing payment at a later date under the current appropriation. Some jurisdictions, however, require the amounts to be included in the following period's budget.)

Instead of re-applying the unspent balance from the general fund to the same programs, the city council may choose to spend the money on other programs. Alternatively, they may use the balance to cut taxes or pay off a long-term debt. With a large surplus, reducing the tax burden will usually be the preferred choice.

== See also ==
- International Financial Reporting Standards
- United States Federal Accounting Standards Advisory Board
- United States Governmental Accounting Standards Board
- Permanent fund
- Sovereign wealth fund
