= List of GASB Statements =

Listing of GASB Statements and any applicable amending/superseding Statements

The Governmental Accounting Standards Board Statements (GASB Statements or GASBS) are issued by GASB to set generally accepted accounting principles (GAAP) for state and local governments in the United States of America. These statements are the most authoritative source for governmental GAAP. Other business entities follow statements issued by Financial Accounting Standards Board (FASB).

No.	Title	Issue date	Changes
1.	Authoritative Status of NCGA Pronouncements and AICPA Industry Audit Guide	July 1984	Amended by various GASBS and GASBCS 1; Partially superseded by GASBS 27
2.	Financial Reporting of Deferred Compensation Plans Adopted under the Provisions of Internal Revenue Code Section 457	Jan. 1986	Superseded by GASBS 32
3.	Deposits with Financial Institutions, Investments (including Repurchase Agreements), and Reverse Repurchase Agreements	Apr. 1986	Amended by various GASBS and GASBI 3; Partially superseded by GASB 40
4.	Applicability of FASB Statement No. 87, "Employers' Accounting for Pensions," to State and Local Governmental Employers	Sept. 1986	Superseded by GASBS 27
5.	Disclosure of Pension Information by Public Employee Retirement Systems and State and Local Governmental Employers	Nov. 1986	Superseded by GASBS 25, and 27
6.	Accounting and Financial Reporting for Special Assessments	Jan. 1987	Amended by various GASBS; Partially superseded by GASBS 44
7.	Advance Refundings Resulting in Defeasance of Debt	Mar. 1987	Amended by GASBS 14, 34, and 86; Partially superseded by GASBS 34
8.	Applicability of FASB Statement No. 93,"Recognition of Depreciation by Not-for-Profit Organizations," to Certain State and Local Governmental Entities	Jan 1988	Superseded by GASBS 35
9.	Reporting Cash Flows of Proprietary and Nonexpendable Trust Funds and Governmental Entities That Use Proprietary Fund Accounting	Sept. 1989	Amended by various GASBS; Partially superseded by GASBS 35
10.	Accounting and Financial Reporting for Risk Financing and Related Insurance Issues	Nov. 1989	Amended by various GASBS and GASBI 4; Partially superseded by various GASBS
11.	Measurement Focus and Basis of Accounting—Governmental Fund Operating Statements	May 1990	Superseded by various GASBS
12.	Disclosure of Information on Postemployment Benefits Other Than Pension Benefits by State and Local Governmental Employers	May 1990	Superseded by GASBS 27 and 45
13.	Accounting for Operating Leases with Scheduled Rent Increases	May 1990	Superseded by GASBS 87
14.	The Financial Reporting Entity	June 1991	Amended by various GASBS; Partially superseded by GASBS 34 and 35
15.	Governmental College and University Accounting and Financial Reporting Models	Oct. 1991	Superseded by GASBS 35
16.	Accounting for Compensated Absences	Nov. 1992	Amended; Partially superseded by GASBS 34, 35, and 101
17.	Measurement Focus and Basis of Accounting—Governmental Fund Operating Statements: Amendment of the Effective Dates of GASB Statement No. 11 and Related Statements—an amendment of GASB Statements No. 10, 11, and 13	June 1993	Amended by GASBS 34 and 63 and GASBI 6; Partially superseded by GASBS 34
18.	Accounting for Municipal Solid Waste Landfill Closure and Postclosure Care Costs	Aug. 93	Amended; Partially superseded
19.	Governmental College and University Omnibus Statement—an amendment of GASB Statements No. 10 and 15	Sept. 1993 1974	Superseded by GASBS 35
20.	Accounting and Financial Reporting for Proprietary Funds and Other Governmental Entities That Use Proprietary Fund Accounting	Sept. 1993	Superseded by GASBS 34 and 62
21.	Accounting for Escheat Property	Oct. 1993	Amended; Partially superseded
22.	Accounting for Taxpayer-Assessed Tax Revenues in Governmental Funds	Dec. 1993	Superseded by GASBS 33
23.	Accounting and Financial Reporting for Refundings of Debt Reported by Proprietary Activities	Dec. 1993	Amended; Partially superseded
24.	Accounting and Financial Reporting for Certain Grants and Other Financial Assistance	June 1994	Amended; Partially superseded
25.	Financial Reporting for Defined Benefit Pension Plans and Note Disclosures for Defined Contribution Plans	Nov. 1994	Superseded by various GASBS
26.	Financial Reporting for Postemployment Healthcare Plans Administered by Defined Benefit Pension Plans	Nov. 1994	Superseded by GASBS 43
27.	Accounting for Pensions by State and Local Governmental Employers	Nov. 1994	Superseded by various GASBS
28.	Accounting and Financial Reporting for Securities Lending Transactions	May 1995	Amended by various GASBS; Partially superseded by GASBS 40
29.	The Use of Not-for-Profit Accounting and Financial Reporting Principles by Governmental Entities	Aug. 1995	Superseded by 34 and 62
30.	Risk Financing Omnibus—an amendment of GASB Statement No. 10	Feb. 1996	Amended by various GASBS
31.	Accounting and Financial Reporting for Certain Investments and for External Investment Pools	Mar. 1997	Amended by various GASBS
32.	Accounting and Financial Reporting for Internal Revenue Code Section 457 Deferred Compensation Plans—a recission of GASB Statement No. 2 and an amendment of GASB Statement No. 31	Oct. 1997	Superseded by GASB 97
33.	Accounting and Financial Reporting for Nonexchange Transactions	Dec. 1998	Amended by various GASBS; Partially superseded by GASBS 34, 36, and 54
34.	Basic Financial Statements—and Management's Discussion and Analysis—for State and Local Governments	June 1999	Amended by various GASBS; Partially superseded by various GASBS
35.	Basic Financial Statements—and Management's Discussion and Analysis—for Public Colleges and Universities—an amendment of GASB Statement No. 34	Nov. 1999	Amended by GASBS 63
36.	Recipient Reporting for Certain Shared Nonexchange Revenues—an amendment of GASB Statement No. 33	Apr. 2000	None
37.	Basic Financial Statements—and Management's Discussion and Analysis—for State and Local Governments: Omnibus—an amendment of GASB Statements No. 21 and No. 34	June 2001	Amended by various GASBS; Partially superseded by GASBS 89
38.	Certain Financial Statement Note Disclosures	June 2001	Amended by various GASBS
39.	Determining Whether Certain Organizations Are Component Units—an amendment of GASB Statement No. 14	May 2002	None
40.	Deposit and Investment Risk Disclosures—an amendment of GASB Statement No. 3	Apr. 2003	Amended by various GASBS; Partially superseded by GASBS 73 and 74
41.	Budgetary Comparison Schedules—Perspective Differences—an amendment of GASB Statement No. 34	May 2003	None
42.	Accounting and Financial Reporting for Impairment of Capital Assets and for Insurance Recoveries	Nov. 2003	Amended by various GASBS
43.	Financial Reporting for Postemployment Benefit Plans Other Than Pension Plans	Mar. 2004	Superseded by GASBS 74
44.	Economic Condition Reporting: The Statistical Section—an amendment of NCGA Statement 1	May 2004	Amended by various GASBS
45.	Accounting and Financial Reporting by Employers for Postemployment Benefits Other Than Pensions	June 2004	Superseded by GASBS 75
46.	Net Assets Restricted by Enabling Legislation—an amendment of GASB Statement No. 34	Dec.2004	Amended by GASBS 63
47.	Accounting for Termination Benefits	June 2005	Amended by various GASBS
48.	Sales and Pledges of Receivables and Future Revenues and Intra-Entity Transfers of Assets and Future Revenues	September 2006	Amended by GASBS 63, 65, and 92; Partially superseded by GASBS 65
49.	Accounting and Financial Reporting for Pollution Remediation Obligations	November 2006	Amended by GASBS 62, 63, and 83
50.	Pension Disclosures—an amendment of GASB Statements No. 25 and No. 27	May 2007	Superseded by GASBS 72 and 73
51.	Accounting and Financial Reporting for Intangible Assets	June 2007	Amended by various GASBS
52.	Land and Other Real Estate Held as Investments by Endowments	Nov. 2007	Amended by GASBS 72
53.	Accounting and Financial Reporting for Derivative Instruments	June 2008	Amended by various GASBS
54.	Fund Balance Reporting and Governmental Fund Type Definitions	March 2009	Amended by GASBS 63 and 84
55.	The Hierarchy of Generally Accepted Accounting Principles for State and Local Governments	March 2009	Superseded by GASBS 76
56.	Codification of Accounting and Financial Reporting Guidance Contained in the AICPA Statements on Auditing Standards	March 2009	Amended by GASBS 63 and 100; Partially superseded by GASBS 62
57.	OPEB Measurements by Agent Employers and Agent Multiple-Employer Plans	December 2009	Superseded by GASB 74 and 75
58.	Accounting and Financial Reporting for Chapter 9 Bankruptcies	December 2009	Amended by GASBS 65 and 87
59.	Financial Instruments Omnibus	June 2010	Amended by GASBS 72, 74, and 79
60.	Accounting and Financial Reporting for Service Concession Arrangements	November 2010	Amended by various GASBS; Partially superseded by various GASBS
61.	The Financial Reporting Entity: Omnibus - an amendment of GASB Statements No. 14 and No. 34	November 2010	Amended by various GASBS
62.	Codification of Accounting and Financial Reporting Guidance Contained in Pre-November 30, 1989 FASB and AICPA Pronouncements	December 2010	Amended by various GASBS; Partially superseded by various GASBS
63.	Financial Reporting of Deferred Outflows of Resources, Deferred Inflows of Resources, and Net Position	June 2011	None
64.	Derivative Instruments: Application of Hedge Accounting Termination Provisions—an amendment of GASB Statement No. 53	June 2011	None
65.	Items Previously Reported as Assets and Liabilities	March 2012	Amended by GASBS 86 and 87; Partially superseded by GASBS 87
66.	Technical Corrections—2012—an amendment of GASB Statements No. 10 and No. 62	March 2012	Amended by GASBS 87; Partially superseded by GASBS 87
67.	Financial Reporting for Pension Plans—an amendment of GASB Statement No. 25	June 2012	Amended by various GASBS
68.	Accounting and Financial Reporting for Pensions—an amendment of GASB Statement No. 27	June 2012	Amended by various GASBS; Partially superseded by GASBS 73
69.	Government Combinations and Disposals of Government Operations	January 2013	Amended by GASBS 76, 92, and 100
70.	Accounting and Financial Reporting for Nonexchange Financial Guarantees	April 2013	Amended by GASBS 91
71.	Pension Transition for Contributions Made Subsequent to the Measurement Date—an amendment of GASB Statement No. 68	November 2013	None
72.	Fair Value Measurement and Application	February 2015	Amended by various GASBS
73.	Accounting and Financial Reporting for Pensions and Related Assets That Are Not within the Scope of GASB Statement 68, and Amendments to Certain Provisions of GASB Statements 67 and 68	June 2015	Amended by various GASBS
74.	Financial Reporting for Postemployment Benefit Plans Other Than Pension Plans	June 2015	Amended by various GASBS
75.	Accounting and Financial Reporting for Postemployment Benefits Other Than Pensions	June 2015	Amended by various GASBS
76.	The Hierarchy of Generally Accepted Accounting Principles for State and Local Governments	June 2015	None
77.	Tax Abatement Disclosures	August 2015	None
78.	Pensions Provided through Certain Multiple-Employer Defined Benefit Pension Plans	December 2015	None
79.	Certain External Investment Pools and Pool Participants	December 2015	Amended by GASBS 91 and 100
80.	Blending Requirements for Certain Component Units—an Amendment of GASB Statement No. 14	January 2016	None
81.	Irrevocable Split-Interest Agreements	March 2016	None
82.	Pension Issues—an amendment of GASB Statements No. 67, No. 68, and No. 73	March 2016	None
83.	Certain Asset Retirement Obligations	November 2016	Amended by GASBS 95
84.	Fiduciary Activities	January 2017	Amended by GASB 92, 95, and 97
85.	Omnibus 2017	March 2017	None
86.	Certain Debt Extinguishment Issues	May 2017	None
87.	Leases	June 2017	Amended by various GASBS
88.	Certain Disclosures Related to Debt, including Direct Borrowings and Direct Placements	April 2018	Amended by GASBS 95
89.	Accounting for Interest Cost Incurred before the End of a Construction Period	June 2018	Amended by GASBS 95
90.	Majority Equity Interests - an amendment of GASB Statements No. 14 and No. 61	August 2018	Amended by GASBS 95
91.	Conduit Debt Obligations	September 2019	Amended by GASBS 94 and 95
92.	Omnibus 2020	January 2020	Amended by GASBS 95
93.	Replacement of Interbank Offered Rates	March 2020	Amended by GASBS 95 and 99
94.	Public-Private and Public-Public Partnerships and Availability Payment Arrangements	March 2020	Amended by GASBS 99
95.	Postponement of the Effective Dates of Certain Authoritative Guidance	May 2020	None
96.	Subscription-Based Information Technology Arrangements (SBITAs)	June 2020	Amended by GASBS 99
97.	Certain Component Unit Criteria, and Accounting and Financial Reporting for Internal Revenue Code Section 457 Deferred Compensation Plans - an amendment of GASB Statements No. 14 and No. 84, and a supersession of GASB Statement No. 32	June 2020	None
98.	The Annual Comprehensive Financial Report	October 2021	None
99.	Omnibus 2022	April 2022	None
100.	Accounting Changes and Error Corrections - an amendment of GASB Statement No. 62	June 2022	None
101.	Compensated Absences	June 2022	None
102.	Certain Risk Disclosures	December 2023	None

== See also ==
- Governmental Accounting Standards Board
