= Accounting Principles Board =

Former authoritative body of the American Institute of Certified Public Accountants

The Accounting Principles Board (APB) is the former authoritative body of the American Institute of Certified Public Accountants (AICPA). It was created by the American Institute of Certified Public Accountants in 1959 and issued pronouncements on accounting principles until 1973, when it was replaced by the Financial Accounting Standards Board (FASB).

The APB was disbanded in the hopes that the smaller, fully independent FASB could more effectively create accounting standards. The APB and the related Securities Exchange Commission were unable to operate completely independently of the U.S. government. According to the SEC, "the overall record of the APB was a reasonably good one, but it seems likely that a smaller full-time body directly in control of its research holds promise of more success". Among others, Abraham Briloff was critical of some actions of the Accounting Principles Board. In response to APB 17, Briloff referred to the APB as the "Accounting Pragmatics Board".

Of the 31 APB opinions and 4 statements, several were instrumental in improving the theory and practice of significant areas of accounting. Many have been superseded by FASB pronouncements; 19 opinions still stand as part of generally accepted accounting principles:

Opinion Number	Subject	Description	Date Issued
2	Accounting for the Investment Credit	Discusses the Revenue Act of 1962 and provides accounting standards for the "investment credit."	December 1962
4	Accounting for the Investment Credit	Clarifies whether the “investment credit” should be considered as part of net income.	March 1964
6	Status of Accounting Research Bulletins	Reviewed the ARB and incorporated needed revisions.	October 1965
9	Reporting the Results of Operations	Discusses the reporting requirements of 1) net income and extraordinary items and 2) computation of earnings per	November 1966
10	Omnibus Opinion—1966	Provides authoritative guidance on consolidated financial statements, tax allocation accounts, taxes payable, and activities related to stocks.	December 1966
12	Omnibus Opinion—1967	Provides authoritative guidance on allowances, depreciation, deferred compensation, capital changes and debt.	December 1967
14	Accounting for Convertible Debt and Debt Issued with Stock Purchase	Provides authoritative guidance related to accounting and reporting for convertible debt.	March 1969
16	Business Combinations	Provides guidance regarding the appropriate accounting and reporting of business combinations.	August 1970
17	Intangible Assets	Provides accounting guidance for reporting goodwill and other intangible assets.	August 1970
18	The Equity Method of Accounting for Investments in Common Stock	Provides guidance for determining when the equity method should be applied to common stock.	March 1971
20	Accounting Changes	Defines various types of accounting changes and establishes guidelines for determining the appropriate reporting of each type.	July 1971
21	Interest on Receivables and Payables	Clarifies when interest should be applied to receivables and payables.	August 1971
22	Disclosure of Accounting Policies	Provides guidance related to the disclosure of accounting principles in the financial statements.	April 1972
23	Accounting for Income Taxes—Special Areas	Establishes accounting and reporting guidelines for subsidiaries, intangible development costs, and various	April 1972
25	Accounting for Stock Issued to Employees	Establishes accounting and reporting guidelines for stock provided as compensation to employees.	October 1972
26	Early Extinguishment of Debt	Provides guidelines for accounting for the differences between debt issues.	October 1972
28	Interim Financial Reporting	Clarifies accounting principles related to interim financial reporting.	May 1973
29	Accounting for Nonmonetary Transactions	Verifies that nonmonetary transactions should be valued based on their fair values, except in a limited number of cases in which nonmonetary exchanges are not considered to be the culmination of an earnings process.	
30	Reporting the Results of Operations	Discusses the proper disclosure of discontinued operations, as well as the reporting of gains or losses from business disposals. It also defines those transactions that should be categorized as extraordinary items.	
