= Certified California Municipal Treasurer =

A Certified California Municipal Treasurer (CCMT) is a post-nominal professional certification awarded by the California Municipal Treasurers Association (CMTA) to California public treasurers who meet standards of education, experience, and a stated commitment to a code of ethics. It was created in 1978 to provide a professional standard of financial expertise and ethics in California government treasury.

It provides a framework for municipal treasurers in improving performance through continuing education and become valued administrators in local government. A CCMT is a professional treasurer who is qualified to meet the challenges of a job that is becoming more and more complex in the environment of public finance.

== Service provided by CCMTs ==
A professional certification provides a degree of confidence that practitioners are adequately trained, educated and experienced to be prepared for financial challenges in the real world. Education, experience and ethics requirements serve as a standard for the profession. Those who have received the Certified California Municipal Treasurer (CCMT) have subjected themselves to review of their educational and experience.

Whereas in the private sector, revenue generation and collection, banking and debt management are important to management and stockholders, in the public sector there is an element of safeguarding the public trust that is added.

== CCMT Requirements ==
CCMT candidates must meet or exceed requirements in two areas; 50% educational standards and 50% experience and training requirements. Certification is also designed as a guide for municipal treasurers to become valued administrators in local government.

Education Requirement: College or University degrees at Bachelor level in Public Administration, Accounting, Finance or related field or satisfactory completion of a course of education approved by CMTA – ½ point per instruction hour.

Professional Experience and Training Requirement equivalent to employment as a Municipal Treasurer for 12.5 years, financial administrative position in local government or in corporate or private business for 25 years or a combination of several factors including board service on state and national treasury boards. Current active participation in CMTA is required.

CCMTs must be recertified every four years. Recertification is accomplished by a combination of treasury experience and a minimum of 40 hours of continuing education.

== Unique Requirements of Public Sector Treasury ==
The Office of the Treasurer is the only office in the Treasury Department that is older than the Department itself, as it was originally created by the Continental Congress in 1775. Michael Hillegas served as the first Treasurer of the United States and throughout the American Revolution until Congress created the Department of the Treasury on September 2, 1789 Steven Mnuchin is currently the United States Secretary of the Treasury.

Bill Lockyer is the Treasurer of the State of California. There are 480 California cities, 58 California counties, and about 3,400 special districts and school districts, each with independent fiscal stewardship. Many City Treasurers are elected, and are therefore directly accountable to their constituents; the remainder are appointed either by City Council or City Manager.

Public treasurers are primarily responsible for managing the revenue and cash flow of a government agency. This officer is also responsible for banking, collections of user fees such as utility usage and business licenses, and communicating financial performance and forecasts to the community. The title may vary, such as finance director, chief financial officer or CFO, from agency to agency.

Treasury has multiple constituencies, with a responsibility to citizens, taxpayers and voters to deliver informed stewardship in the investment of public funds (taxes). Additionally, treasury reporting must fund internal programs and fulfill budgetary requirements meeting expectations of governing city councils and boards of directors within approved financial policy guidelines.

== Responsibilities of Public Treasury ==
According to Benjamin Finkelstein, “On Main Street, political risk entails all the bad things that can happen to elected officials and their appointees when they take risks – even reasonable risks – with taxpayer money and come up short.”

The municipal treasurer does not have the public's permission to put public funds principal at risk, no matter how great the potential yield. Securities options, therefore, are limited by statute to the safest portion of the investment continuum. Public Treasury statutes mandate a priority of safety (first), liquidity (secondarily) and yield (last). Since there is an inverse relationship between risk and rate of return, the potential return is limited by the risk that public funds are permitted to take.

== California Government Investment Environment ==
The objective of municipal investments is to enhance the economic status of a given agency consistent with the prudent protection of the agency's investments. Agencies are required to create a publicly reviewed investment policy, prepared in conformance with all pertinent existing laws of the State of California including California Government Code Sections 53600, et seq. This section of California Government Code defines permitted and prohibited investments. California public treasurers must abide within the limits of this code.

== See also ==
- Government of California
- List of finance topics
- List of post-nominal letters
- Professional certification
