= Federal Accounting Standards Advisory Board =

Federal advisory committee

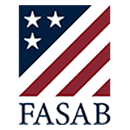

Agency overview
- Formed: October 1990
- Headquarters: Washington, DC
- Agency executives: George A. Scott, Chairman; Monica R. Valentine, Executive Director
- Website: www.fasab.gov

The Federal Accounting Standards Advisory Board (FASAB) is a United States federal advisory committee whose mission is to improve federal financial reporting through issuing federal financial accounting standards and providing guidance after considering the needs of external and internal users of federal financial information. FASAB is designated as the body that sets U.S. generally accepted accounting principles (GAAP) for the United States Government and its component entities, referred to as federal financial reporting entities. The AICPA Council designated FASAB as the body that establishes GAAP for federal entities in 1999.

The Chief Financial Officers Act of 1990 required annual, audited financial statements for the United States Government and its federal reporting entities. In order to apply the statutes of the CFO Act of 1990, the Secretary of the Treasury, the Director of the Office of Management and Budget (OMB), and the Comptroller General established FASAB to develop the "applicable accounting principles" for the newly required financial statements.

FASAB issues the Statement of Federal Financial Accounting Standards (SFFAS), Interpretations, Technical Bulletins, Technical Releases, and Staff Implementation Guidance. FASAB standards are publicly available on its website--both by chapter and in the FASAB Handbook, which is updated annually.
