= Chief Financial Officers Act =

United States federal law concerning accountability of government financing

- Long title: An act to amend title 31, United States Code, to improve the general financial management of the Federal Government.
- Acronyms (colloquial): CFO Act
- Enacted by: the 101st United States Congress
- Effective: November 15, 1990

Citations
- Public law: Pub. L. 101–576

Legislative history
- Introduced in the House of Representatives as H.R. 5687 by John Conyers D‑MI on September 21, 1990; Passed the House on October 15, 1990; Passed the Senate on October 27, 1990 with amendment; Houses agreed to Senate amendment on October 28, 1990 (by voice); Signed into law by President George H. W. Bush on November 15, 1990

The Chief Financial Officers (CFO) Act of 1990 (Public Law 101–576) signed into law by President George H. W. Bush on November 15, 1990, is a United States federal law intended to improve the government's financial management, outlining standards of financial performance and disclosure. Among other measures, the Office of Management and Budget (OMB) was given greater authority over federal financial management. For each of 24 federal departments and agencies, the position of chief financial officer was created. In accordance with the CFO Act, each agency or department vests its financial management functions in its chief financial officer. The following is a list of the 24 affected agencies, which includes all 15 federal executive departments whose heads are included in the Cabinet of the United States, as well as other large agencies:

- Department of Agriculture
- Department of Commerce
- Department of Defense
- Department of Education
- Department of Energy
- Department of Health and Human Services
- Department of Homeland Security
- Department of Housing and Urban Development
- Department of the Interior
- Department of Justice
- Department of Labor
- Department of State
- Department of Transportation
- Department of Treasury
- Department of Veterans Affairs
- Environmental Protection Agency
- National Aeronautics and Space Administration
- Agency for International Development
- Social Security Administration
- General Services Administration
- National Science Foundation
- Nuclear Regulatory Commission
- Office of Personnel Management
- Small Business Administration

The Act created a new position in the OMB, the Deputy Director for Management, who is the government's chief financial management official. It also created a new sub-division of the OMB, the Office of Federal Financial Management (OFFM), to carry out government-wide financial management responsibilities. The OFFM's chief officer was designated as the newly created Controller position. Both the Deputy Director for Management and the Controller are appointed by the President with the advice and consent of the Senate.

The Committee on Government Reform oversees the management and infrastructure of the federal agencies, including those covered by the CFO Act.

The CFO Act also established the CFO Council, consisting of the CFOs and Deputy CFOs of the largest federal agencies and senior officials of OMB and Treasury.

For a discussion of the history and motivation underlying the CFO Act - with particular emphasis on the difficulties the U.S. Department of Defense has experienced attempting to comply with the financial-statement reporting requirements of the Act - see "Financial Accountability at the DOD: Reviewing the Bidding," published in the July 2009 issue of the Defense Acquisition Review Journal, pgs. 181–196.

The CFO Act was authored by staff of the House of Representatives Committee on Government Operations, now the Committee of Government Oversight and Reform, under the leadership of Committee Chairman John Conyers (D-MI) and Ranking Minority Member Frank Horton (R-NY). The CFO Act passed the House of Representatives by Unanimous Consent.

Federal agencies not listed above, including at least 75 small or "micro" agencies, are not subject to the CFO Act. These agencies may be subject to other financial reporting standards under provisions such as the Accountability of Tax Dollars Act of 2002.

== See also ==
- Federal Accounting Standards Advisory Board (FASAB)
