= Governmental Accounting Standards Board =

Rulemaking body for financial transactions in US state and local governments

The Governmental Accounting Standards Board (GASB) is the source of generally accepted accounting principles (GAAP) used by state and local governments in the United States. As with most of the entities involved in creating GAAP in the United States, it is a private, non-governmental organization.

The GASB is subject to oversight by the Financial Accounting Foundation (FAF), which selects the members of the GASB and the Financial Accounting Standards Board, and it funds both organizations.

Its mission is to establish and improve standards of state and local governmental accounting and financial reporting that will result in useful information for users of financial reports and guide and educate the public, including issuers, auditors, and users of those financial reports.

The GASB has issued Statements, Interpretations, Technical Bulletins, Concept Statements and Implementation Guides — defining GAAP for state and local governments since 1984. GAAP for the Federal government is defined by the Federal Accounting Standards Advisory Board.

In January 2020, GASB appointed Joel Black to succeed David Vaudt as the chair. Black is also partner-in-charge of Mauldin & Jenkins LLC.

== See also ==
- List of GASB Statements
