= List of computer security certifications =

In the computer security or Information security fields, there are a number of tracks a professional can take to demonstrate qualifications. (Note: This article is about the certification and credentialing of individuals. It does not include certification of organizations or classified computer systems by authorizing, accrediting, and approval bodies and authorities as meeting a prescribed set of safeguards.) Four sources categorizing these, and many other credentials, licenses, and certifications, are:

1. Schools and universities
2. Vendor-sponsored credentials (e.g. Microsoft, Cisco)
3. Association- and organization-sponsored credentials
4. Governmental (or quasi-governmental) licenses, certifications, and credentials

Quality and acceptance vary worldwide for IT security credentials, from well-known and high-quality examples like a master's degree in the field from an accredited school, CISSP, and Microsoft certification, to a controversial list of many dozens of lesser-known credentials and organizations.

In addition to certification obtained by taking courses and/or passing exams (and in the case of CISSP and others noted below, demonstrating experience and/or being recommended or given a reference from an existing credential holder), award certificates also are given for winning government, university or industry-sponsored competitions, including team competitions and contests.

== Certifying organizations ==
=== Vendor-neutral ===
- Altered Security
- ASIS International
- APMG International
- Blockchain Council
- Blockchain Training Alliance
- Cloud Credential Council (CCC)
- CertNexus
- CERTCOP
- CompTIA
- CREST
- Crypto Consortium
- Cloud Security Alliance (CSA)
- CWNP
- CyberDefenders
- Cyber Struggle
- EC Council
- EITCA/IS
- INE Security
- EXIN
- GAQM
- GIAC
- HISPI
- InfoSec Institute
- IBITGQ
- TCM Security
- The IIA
- IAPP
- ISACA
- ISECOM
- ISC2
- Linux Professional Institute (LPI)
- Lunarline
- Mile2
- Offensive Security
- Practical DevSecOps
- PECB
- The Open Group
- The SecOps Group
- SECO-Institute
- SABSA
- Star Certification
- Zero-Point Security
- EC First
- 8kSec
- Hack The Box (HTB)
- TryHackMe (THM)
- CyberWarfareLabs (CWL)
- CNITSEC

=== Vendor-specific ===
- Alibaba (Cloud)
- AWS
- Cisco
- Check Point
- Fortinet
- Google
- IBM
- Jamf
- Juniper
- Microsoft
- Kali
- OpenText
- Palo Alto
- Red Hat
- Symantec (since 2012 NortonLifeLock)

== List of certifications ==
=== Vendor-neutral ===
(Note: In this chart, colors are used to help group certifications from the same issuer together and have no other significance.)

Issuing Organization	Credential abbreviation	Certification Title	Focus	Validity duration	Number issued						
Issuing Organization	Credential abbreviation	Certification Title	Focus	Validity duration	Number issued	Altered Security	CRTP	Certified Red Team Professional	Red Teaming	3 years	N/A
CRTE	Certified Red Team Expert					Altered Security			Red Teaming	3 years	N/A
CRTM	Certified Red Team Master					Altered Security			Red Teaming	3 years	N/A
CARTP	Certified Azure Red Team Professional					Altered Security			Red Teaming	3 years	N/A
CAWASP	Certified Azure Web Application Security Professional	Application Security				Altered Security				3 years	N/A
SECO-Institute	S-ITSF	IT-Security Foundation	General Cyber Security	3 years	N/A						
SECO-Institute	S-ITSP	IT-Security Practitioner	General Cyber Security	3 years	N/A						
SECO-Institute	S-ITSE	IT-Security Expert	General Cyber Security	3 years	N/A						
SECO-Institute	S-CITSO	Certified IT-Security Officer	General Cyber Security	3 years	N/A						
SECO-Institute	S-DPF	Data Protection Foundation	Privacy	No expiration	N/A						
SECO-Institute	S-DPP	Data Protection Practitioner	Privacy	1 year	N/A						
SECO-Institute	S-CDPO	Certified Data Protection Officer	Privacy	3 years	N/A						
SECO-Institute	S-EHF	Ethical Hacking Foundation	Penetration Testing	3 years	N/A						
SECO-Institute	S-EHP	Ethical Hacking Practitioner	Penetration Testing	3 years	N/A						
SECO-Institute	S-SPF	Secure Programming Foundation	Software Development	3 years	N/A						
SECO-Institute	S-DWF	Dark Web Foundation	Threat Intelligence	3 years	N/A						
ISC2	CC	Certified in CyberSecurity	General Cyber Security	3 years (continuously)	N/A						
ISC2	CISSP	Certified Information Systems Security Professional	Management	3 years (continuously)	127,734						
ISC2	ISSAP	Information Systems Security Architecture Professional	Security Architecture	3 years (continuously)	1,952						
ISC2	ISSEP	Information Systems Security Engineering Professional	IT-Administration	3 years (continuously)	1,147						
ISC2	ISSMP	Information Systems Security Management Professional	Management	3 years (continuously)	1,196						
ISC2	SSCP	Systems Security Certified Practitioner	IT-Administration	3 years (continuously)	4,319						
ISC2	CCSP	Certified Cloud Security Professional	Cloud Security	3 years (continuously)	3,549						
ISC2	CGRC	Certified in Governance, Risk and Compliance	Auditing	3 years (continuously)	2,671						
ISC2	CSSLP	Certified Secure Software Lifecycle Professional	Software Development	3 years (continuously)	2,214						
CompTIA	Security+	CompTIA Security+	IT-Administration	3 years	N/A						
CompTIA	CySA+	CompTIA Cyber Security Analyst	Security Analysis	3 years	N/A						
CompTIA	PenTest+	CompTIA Pentest+	Penetration Testing	3 years	N/A						
CompTIA	CASP+	CompTIA Advanced Security Practitioner	General Cyber Security	3 years	N/A						
ISACA	CISA	Certified Information Systems Auditor	Auditing	3 years	115,000						
ISACA	CISM	Certified Information Security Manager	Management	3 years	27,000						
ISACA	CRISC	Certified In Risk and Information Systems Control	Risk Management	3 years	18,000						
ISACA	CGEIT	Certified in the Governance of Enterprise IT	Management	3 years	6,000						
ISACA	CSX-F	Cyber Security Fundamentals	General Cyber Security	3 years	N/A						
ISACA	CSX-T	Cyber Security Technical Foundations	General Cyber Security	3 years	N/A						
ISACA	CSX-P	Cyber Security Practitioner	General Cyber Security	3 years	N/A						
ISACA	CSX-A	Cyber Security Audit	Auditing	3 years	N/A						
ISACA	CDPSE	CERTIFIED DATA PRIVACY SOLUTIONS ENGINEER	Data Privacy	3 years	N/A						
GIAC	GSE	Security Expert	General Cyber Security	4 years	N/A						
GIAC	GSEC	Security Essentials	General Cyber Security	4 years	N/A						
GIAC	GCIA	Certified Intrusion Analyst	Security Analysis	4 years	N/A						
GIAC	GISF	GIAC Information Security Fundamentals	General Cyber Security	4 years	N/A						
GIAC	GCED	Certified Enterprise Defender	Cyber Defense	4 years	N/A						
GIAC	GCWN	Certified Windows Security Administrator	IT-Administration	4 years	N/A						
GIAC	GMON	Continuous Monitoring Certification	Threat Intelligence	4 years	N/A						
GIAC	GCCC	Critical Controls Certification	Cyber Defense	4 years	N/A						
GIAC	GCLD	Cloud Security Essentials	Cyber Defense	4 years	N/A						
GIAC	GDSA	Defensible Security Architecture	Security Architecture	4 years	N/A						
GIAC	GCDA	Certified Detection Analyst	Threat Intelligence	4 years	N/A						
GIAC	GDAT	Defending Advanced Threats	Cyber Defense	4 years	N/A						
GIAC	GCIH	Certified Incident Handler	Incident Response	4 years	N/A						
GIAC	GPEN	Penetration Tester	Penetration Testing	4 years	N/A						
GIAC	GWAPT	Web Application Penetration Tester	Penetration Testing	4 years	N/A						
GIAC	GXPN	Exploit Researcher and Advanced Penetration Tester	Penetration Testing	4 years	N/A						
GIAC	GMOB	Mobile Device Security Analyst	Security Analysis	4 years	N/A						
GIAC	GAWN	Assessing and Auditing Wireless Networks	Wireless Security	4 years	N/A						
GIAC	GPYC	Python Coder	Software Development	4 years	N/A						
GIAC	GCFA	Certified Forensic Analyst	Forensics	4 years	N/A						
GIAC	GCFE	Certified Forensic Examiner	Forensics	4 years	N/A						
GIAC	GREM	Reverse Engineering Malware	Malware Analysis	4 years	N/A						
GIAC	GNFA	Network Forensic Analyst	Forensics	4 years	N/A						
GIAC	GCTI	Cyber Threat Intelligence	Threat Intelligence	4 years	N/A						
GIAC	GASF	Advanced Smartphone Forensics	Forensics	4 years	N/A						
GIAC	GSLC	Security Leadership	Management	4 years	N/A						
GIAC	GSNA	Systems and Network Auditor	Auditing	4 years	N/A						
GIAC	GISP	Information Security Professional	General Cyber Security	4 years	N/A						
GIAC	GLEG	Law of Data Security & Investigations	Forensics	4 years	N/A						
GIAC	GCPM	Certified Project Manager	Management	4 years	N/A						
GIAC	GSTRT	Strategic Planning, Policy, and Leadership	Management	4 years	N/A						
GIAC	GWEB	Certified Web Application Defender	Software Development	4 years	N/A						
GIAC	GICSP	Global Industrial Cyber Security Professional	Critical Infrastructure Security	4 years	N/A						
GIAC	GRID	Response and Industrial Defense	Critical Infrastructure Security	4 years	N/A						
GIAC	GCIP	Critical Infrastructure Protection	Critical Infrastructure Security	4 years	N/A						
GIAC	GOSI	Open Source Intelligence	Threat Intelligence	4 years	N/A						
GIAC	GBFA	Battlefield Forensics and Acquisition	Forensics	4 years	N/A						
GIAC	GCSA	Cloud Security Automation	Cloud Security	4 years	N/A						
GIAC	GFCT	Foundational Cybersecurity Technologies	Cloud Security	4 years	N/A						
GIAC	GSOC	Security Operations Certified	Security Operations	4 years	N/A						
GIAC	GPCS	Public Cloud Security	Cloud Security	4 years	N/A						
CyberDefenders	CCD	Certified CyberDefender	Cyber Defense	No expiration	N/A						
EC-Council	CSCU	EC-Council Certified Secure Computer User	Security Awareness	No expiration	N/A						
EC-Council	CND	EC-Council Certified Network Defender	Network Security	3 years	N/A						
EC-Council	CEH	EC-Council Certified Ethical Hacker	Penetration Testing	3 years	N/A						
EC-Council	CEH-Practical (Master)	EC-Council Certified Ethical Hacker Practical (Master)	Penetration Testing	3 years	N/A						
EC-Council	ECSA	EC-Council Certified Security Analyst	Penetration Testing	3 years	N/A						
EC-Council	ECSA-Master (Practical)	EC-Council Certified Security Analyst (Practical)	Penetration Testing	3 years	N/A						
EC-Council	LPT-Master (Practical)	EC-Council Licensed Penetration Tester (Master)	Penetration Testing	1 year (Note: First validation period after exam is 2 years.)	N/A						
EC-Council	E|ISM	EC-Council Information Security Manager	Management	3 years	N/A						
EC-Council	CCISO	EC-Council Certified Chief Information Security Officer	Management	1 year	N/A						
EC-Council	ECIH	EC-Council Certified Incident Handler	Incident Response	3 years	N/A						
EC-Council	CHFI	EC-Council Computer Hacking Forensic Investigator	Forensics	3 years	N/A						
EC-Council	EDRP	EC-Council Disaster Recovery Professional	Disaster Recovery	3 years	N/A						
EC-Council	ECES	EC-Council Certified Encryption Specialist	Encryption	3 years	N/A						
EC-Council	CASE Java	EC-Council Certified Application Security Engineer Java	Software Development	3 years	N/A						
EC-Council	CASE .Net	EC-Council Certified Application Security Engineer .Net	Software Development	3 years	N/A						
EC-Council	CTIA	EC-Council Certified Threat Intelligence Analyst	Threat Intelligence	3 years	N/A						
EC-Council	CSA	EC-Council Certified SOC Analyst	Security Analysis	3 years	N/A						
EC-Council	ECSS	EC-Council Certified Security Specialist	General Cyber Security	3 years	N/A						
EC-Council	CCSE	EC-Council Cloud Security Engineer	Cloud Security	3 years	N/A						
OffSec	OSCP	OffSec Certified Professional	Penetration Testing	No expiration	N/A						
OffSec	OSWP	OffSec Wireless Professional	Penetration Testing	No expiration	N/A						
OffSec	OSWA	OffSec Web Assessor	Penetration Testing	No expiration	N/A						
OffSec	OSEP	OffSec Experienced Penetration Tester	Penetration Testing	No expiration	N/A						
OffSec	OSED	OffSec Security Exploit Developer	Exploit Development	No expiration	N/A						
OffSec	OSWE	OffSec Web Expert	Penetration Testing	No expiration	N/A						
OffSec	OSCE^{3}	OffSec Certified Expert^{3}	Penetration Testing	No expiration	N/A						
OffSec	OSEE	OffSec Exploitation Expert	Exploit Development	No expiration	N/A						
OffSec	OSDA	OffSec Defensive Analyst	Security Operations	No expiration	N/A						
OffSec	OSMR	OffSec macOS Researcher	Exploit Development	No expiration	N/A						
OffSec	OSIR	OffSec Incident Responder	Incident Response	Starting with certifications new to the market in 2024, OffSec certifications will expire after 3 years.	N/A						
OffSec	OSMR	OffSec Threat Hunter	Threat Hunting	Starting with certifications new to the market in 2024, OffSec certifications will expire after 3 years.	N/A						
EITCI	EITCA/IS	EITCA Information Technologies Security Academy	General Cyber Security	No expiration	N/A						
CSA	CCSK	CSA Certificate of Cloud Security Knowledge	Cloud Security	No expiration	N/A						
Cloud Credential Council	PCSM	CCC Professional Cloud Security Manager	Cloud Security	No expiration	N/A						
IAPP	CIPP	Certified Information Privacy Professional	Privacy	2 years	50,000 Total						
IAPP	CIPM	Certified Information Privacy Manager	Privacy	2 years	50,000 Total						
IAPP	CIPT	Certified Information Privacy Technologist	Privacy	2 years	50,000 Total						
INE Security	eJPT	eLearnSecurity Certified Junior Penetration Tester	Penetration Testing	No expiration	N/A						
INE Security	eWPT	eLearnSecurity Web Application Penetration Tester	Penetration Testing	No expiration	N/A						
INE Security	eWPTX	eLearnSecurity Web Application Penetration Tester eXtreme	Penetration Testing	No expiration	N/A						
INE Security	eMAPT	eLearnSecurity Mobile Application Penetration Tester	Penetration Testing	No expiration	N/A						
INE Security	eCPT	eLearnSecurity Certified Penetration Tester	Penetration Testing	No expiration	N/A						
INE Security	eCIR	eLearnSecurity Certified Incident Response Professional	Incident Response	No expiration	N/A						
INE Security	eCTHP	eLearnSecurity Certified Threat Hunting Professional	Threat Hunting	No expiration	N/A						
INE Security	eCDFP	eLearnSecurity Certified Digital Forensics Professional	Digital Forensics	No expiration	N/A						
CREST	CPSA	CREST Practitioner Security Analyst	Penetration Testing	3 Years	N/A						
CREST	CRT	CREST Registered Penetration Tester	Penetration Testing	3 Years	N/A						
CREST	CCT App	CREST Certified Web Application Tester	Penetration Testing	3 Years	N/A						
CREST	CCT Inf	CREST Certified Infrastructure Tester	Penetration Testing	3 Years	N/A						
CREST	CCSAS	CREST Certified Simulated Attack Specialist	Attack Simulation	3 Years	N/A						
CREST	CCSAM	CREST Certified Simulated Attack Manager	Attack Simulation	3 Years	N/A						
CREST	CCWS	CREST Certified Wireless Specialist	Wireless security	3 Years	N/A						
CREST	CPTIA	CREST Practitioner Threat Intelligence Analyst	Threat Intelligence	3 Years	N/A						
CREST	CRTIA	CREST Registered Threat Intelligence Analyst	Threat Intelligence	3 Years	N/A						
CREST	CCTIM	CREST Certified Threat Intelligence Manager	Threat Intelligence	3 Years	N/A						
CREST	CPIA	CREST Practitioner Intrusion Analyst	Security Analysis	3 Years	N/A						
CREST	CRIA	CREST Registered Intrusion Analyst	Security Analysis	3 Years	N/A						
CREST	CCNIA	CREST Certified Network Intrusion Analyst	Security Analysis	3 Years	N/A						
CREST	CCHIA	CREST Certified Host Intrusion Analyst	Security Analysis	3 Years	N/A						
CREST	CCMRE	CREST Certified Malware Reverse Engineer	Malware Analysis	3 Years	N/A						
CREST	CCIM	CREST Certified Incident Manager	Incident Response	3 Years	N/A						
CREST	CRTSA	CREST Registered Technical Security Architect	Security Architecture	3 Years	N/A						
InfoSec Institute	CCFE	Certified Computer Forensics Examiner	Forensics	4 years	N/A						
InfoSec Institute	CCTHP	Certified Cyber Threat Hunting Professional	Threat Hunting	4 years	N/A						
InfoSec Institute	CDRP	Certified Data Recovery Professional	Disaster Recovery	4 years	N/A						
InfoSec Institute	CEPT	Certified Expert Penetration Tester	Penetration Testing	4 years	N/A						
InfoSec Institute	CEREA	Certified Expert Reverse Engineering Analyst	Malware Analysis	4 years	N/A						
InfoSec Institute	CMWAPT	Certified Mobile and Web Application Penetration Tester	Penetration Testing	4 years	N/A						
InfoSec Institute	CMFE	Certified Mobile Forensics Examiner	Forensics	4 years	N/A						
InfoSec Institute	CPT	Certified Penetration Tester	Penetration Testing	4 years	N/A						
InfoSec Institute	CRTOP	Certified Red Team Operations Professional	Red Teaming	4 years	N/A						
InfoSec Institute	CREA	Certified Reverse Engineering Analyst	Malware Analysis	4 years	N/A						
InfoSec Institute	CSSA	Certified SCADA Security Architect	Critical Infrastructure Security	4 years	N/A						
InfoSec Institute	CSAP	Certified Security Awareness Practitioner	Security Awareness	4 years	N/A						
Cyber Struggle	CSAE	Cyber Struggle Aegis	Security Analysis	No expiration	N/A						
Cyber Struggle	CSR	Cyber Struggle Ranger	Red Teaming	No expiration	N/A						
Cyber Struggle	CSTPO	Cyber Struggle Tactical Pistol Operator	Tactical fire gun shooting	No expiration	N/A						
Linux Professional Institute (LPI)	SecE	Linux Professional Institute Security Essentials	General Cyber Security	No expiration	N/A						
Linux Professional Institute (LPI)	LPIC-3 Security	Linux Professional Institute LPIC-3 Security	IT-Administration	5 years	N/A						
Mile2	C)SA1	Certified Security Awareness 1	Security Awareness	3 Years	N/A						
Mile2	C)SA2	Certified Security Awareness 2	Security Awareness	3 Years	N/A						
Mile2	C)SP	Certified Security Principles	General Cyber Security	3 Years	N/A						
Mile2	C)ISSO	Certified Information Systems Security Officer	Management	3 Years	N/A						
Mile2	IS20	Information Security 20 Security Controls	General Cyber Security	3 Years	N/A						
Mile2	C)SLO	Certified Security Leadership Officer	Management	3 Years	N/A						
Mile2	C)VA	Certified Vulnerability Assessor	Vulnerability Management	3 Years	N/A						
Mile2	C)PEH	Certified Professional Ethical Hacker	Penetration Testing	3 Years	N/A						
Mile2	C)PTE	Certified Penetration Tester	Penetration Testing	3 Years	N/A						
Mile2	C)PTC	Certified Penetration Testing Consultant	Penetration Testing	3 Years	N/A						
Mile2	C)PSH	Certified PowerShell Hacker	Scripting	3 Years	N/A						
Mile2	C)IHE	Certified Incident Handling Engineer	Incident Response	3 Years	N/A						
Mile2	C)DFE	Certified Digital Forensic Examiner	Forensics	3 Years	N/A						
Mile2	C)VFE	Certified Virtualization Forensics Engineer	Forensics	3 Years	N/A						
Mile2	C)NFE	Certified Network Forensics Examiner	Forensics	3 Years	N/A						
Mile2	C)DRE	Certified Disaster Recovery Engineer	Disaster Recovery	3 Years	N/A						
Mile2	C)HISSP	Certified Healthcare Information Systems Security Professional	Healthcare	3 Years	N/A						
Mile2	C)ISMS-LA	Certified Information Security Management Systems Lead Auditor	Auditing	3 Years	N/A						
Mile2	C)ISMS-LI	Certified Information Security Management Systems Lead Implementer	Risk Management	3 Years	N/A						
Mile2	C)ISSA	Certified Information Security Systems Auditor	Auditing	3 Years	N/A						
Mile2	C)SWAE	Certified Secure Web Application Engineer	Application Security	3 Years	N/A						
Mile2	C)VCP	Certified Virtualization Principles	Virtualization	3 Years	N/A						
Mile2	C)VE	Certified Virtualization Engineer	Virtualization	3 Years	N/A						
Mile2	C)CSO	Certified Cloud Security Officer	Cloud Security	3 Years	N/A						
Mile2	C)VSE	Certified Virtualization Systems Engineer	Virtualization	3 Years	N/A						
Mile2	C)CSSM	Certified Cybersecurity Systems Manager	Management	3 Years	N/A						
Mile2	C)ISRM	Certified Information Systems Risk Manager	Risk Management	3 Years	N/A						
Mile2	ISCAP	Information Systems Certification & Accreditation Professional	Auditing	3 Years	N/A						
Mile2	C)SWAE	Certified Secure Web Application Engineer	Web Security	3 Years	N/A						
Mile2	C)ISS	Certified IPv6 Security Specialist	Network Security	3 Years	N/A						
Mile2	C)CSA	Certified Cybersecurity Analyst	Security Analysis	3 Years	N/A						
Mile2	C)CTA	Certified Cyber Threat Analyst	Security Analysis	3 Years	N/A						
Mile2	C)CTIA	Certified Cyber Threat Intelligence Analyst	Threat Intelligence	3 Years	N/A						
ASIS International	CPP	Certified Protection Professional	Management	3 Years	N/A						
ASIS International	APP	Associate Protection Professional	Management	3 Years	N/A						
ASIS International	PCI	Professional Certified Investigator	Forensics	3 Years	N/A						
ASIS International	PSP	Physical Security Professional	Physical Security	3 Years	N/A						
SABSA	SABSA-SCF	SABSA Chartered Security Architect – Foundation Certificate	Security Architecture	3 Years	N/A						
SABSA	SABSA-SCP	SABSA Chartered Security Architect – Practitioner Certificate	Security Architecture	3 Years	N/A						
SABSA	SABSA-SCM	SABSA Chartered Security Architect – Master Certificate	Security Architecture	3 Years	N/A						
APMG International	ISO/IEC 27001-F	ISO/IEC 27001 Foundation	Standards	No expiration	N/A						
APMG International	ISO/IEC 27001-P ISO	ISO/IEC 27001 Practitioner - Information Security Officer	Standards	No expiration	N/A						
APMG International	NCSP-F	NIST Cyber Security Professional Foundation	Standards	No expiration	N/A						
APMG International	NCSP-P	NIST Cyber Security Professional Practitioner	Standards	No expiration	N/A						
EXIN	PDP-E	EXIN Privacy & Data Protection Essentials	Privacy	No expiration	N/A						
EXIN	PDP-F	EXIN Privacy & Data Protection Foundation	Privacy	No expiration	N/A						
EXIN	PDP-P	EXIN Privacy and Data Protection Practitioner	Privacy	No expiration	N/A						
EXIN	CIT-F	EXIN Cyber & IT Security Foundation	General Cyber Security	No expiration	N/A						
EXIN	CEF	EXIN Ethical Hacking Foundation	Penetration Testing	No expiration	N/A						
EXIN	ISO/IEC 27001-F	EXIN Information Security Management ISO27001 Foundation	Standards	No expiration	N/A						
EXIN	ISO/IEC 27001-P	EXIN Information Security Management ISO27001 Professional	Standards	No expiration	N/A						
EXIN	ISO/IEC 27001-E	EXIN Information Security Management ISO27001 Expert	Standards	No expiration	N/A						
EXIN	SP-F	EXIN Secure Programming Foundation	Software Development	No expiration	N/A						
IBITGQ	EU GDPR F	Certified EU General Data Protection Regulation Foundation	Standards	No expiration	N/A						
IBITGQ	EU GDPR P	Certified EU General Data Protection Regulation Practitioner	Standards	No expiration	N/A						
IBITGQ	C-DPO	Certified Data Protection Officer	Privacy	No expiration	N/A						
IBITGQ	C BS PIMS LI	Certified BS 10012 PIMS Lead Implementer	Standards	No expiration	N/A						
IBITGQ	CCPA F	California Consumer Privacy Act Foundation	Privacy	No expiration	N/A						
IBITGQ	C IDP F	Certified Introduction to Data Protection	Privacy	No expiration	N/A						
IBITGQ	CIS F	Certified ISO 27001 ISMS Foundation	Standards	No expiration	N/A						
IBITGQ	CIS LI	Certified ISO 27001 ISMS Lead Implementer	Standards	No expiration	N/A						
IBITGQ	CIS LA	Certified ISO 27001 ISMS Lead Auditor	Standards	No expiration	N/A						
IBITGQ	CIS IA	Certified ISO 27001 ISMS Internal Auditor	Standards	No expiration	N/A						
IBITGQ	CISRM	Certified ISO 27005 ISMS Risk Management	Standards	No expiration	N/A						
IBITGQ	PCI IM	PCI DSS Implementation	Standards	No expiration	N/A						
IBITGQ	CCRMP	Managing Cyber Security Risk	Management	No expiration	N/A						
IBITGQ	CIRM F	Cyber Incident Response Management Foundation	Incident Response	No expiration	N/A						
IBITGQ	C CR P	Certified Cyber Resilience Practitioner	Management	No expiration	N/A						
IBITGQ	CITGP	Implementing IT Governance – Foundation & Principles	Management	No expiration	N/A						
IBITGQ	C CS F	Certified Cyber Security Foundation	General Cyber Security	No expiration	N/A						
CertNexus	CFR	CyberSec First Responder	Incident Response	3 Years	N/A						
CertNexus	CIOTSP	Certified IoT Security Practitioner (CIoTSP)	IoT	3 Years	N/A						
CertNexus	IRBIZ	Incident Response for Business Professionals	Incident Response	3 Years	N/A						
CertNexus	CSC	Cyber Secure Coder	Software Development	3 Years	N/A						
CertNexus	CYBERSAFE	CyberSAFE	End user security	1 Year	N/A						
Lunarline	CEHT	Certified Expert Hunt Team	Threat Hunting	3 Years	N/A						
Lunarline	CECS	Certified Expert Cloud Security	Cloud Security	3 Years	N/A						
Lunarline	CEIA	Certified Expert Independent Assessor	Auditing	3 Years	N/A						
Lunarline	CEPM	Certified Expert Program Manager	Management	3 Years	N/A						
Lunarline	CERP	Certified Expert RMF Professional	Management	3 Years	N/A						
Lunarline	CESA	Certified Expert Security Analyst	Security Analysis	3 Years	N/A						
McAfee Institute	CECI	Certified Expert in Cyber Investigations	Forensics	2 Years	N/A						
McAfee Institute	CCII	Certified Cyber Intelligence Investigator	Threat Intelligence	2 Years	N/A						
McAfee Institute	CCIP	Certified Cyber Intelligence Professional	Threat Intelligence	2 Years	N/A						
McAfee Institute	CSMIE	Certified Social Media Intelligence Expert	Threat Intelligence	2 Years	N/A						
McAfee Institute	SMIA	Certified Social Media Intelligence Analyst	Threat Intelligence	2 Years	N/A						
McAfee Institute	CCTA	Certified Counterintelligence Threat Analyst	Threat Intelligence	2 Years	N/A						
McAfee Institute	CPCI	Certified Professional Criminal Investigator	Forensics	2 Years	N/A						
McAfee Institute	CORCI	Certified Organized Retail Crime Investigator	Forensics	2 Years	N/A						
McAfee Institute	CEL	Certified Executive Leader	Management	2 Years	N/A						
McAfee Institute	CHTI	Certified Human Trafficking Investigator	Forensics	2 Years	N/A						
McAfee Institute	CCFI	Certified Cryptocurrency Forensic Investigator	Forensics	2 Years	N/A						
McAfee Institute	WVTS	Certified Workplace violence and threat specialist	Forensics	2 Years	N/A						
McAfee Institute	C|OSINT	Certified in Open Source Intelligence	Threat Intelligence	2 Years	N/A						
The IIA	CIA	Certified Internal Auditor	Auditing		160,000+						
The IIA	CRMA	Certification in Risk Management Assurance	Risk Management		N/A						
The IIA	QIAL	Qualification in Internal Audit Leadership	Auditing		N/A						
GAQM	CSST	Certified Software Security Tester	Software Development	No expiration	N/A						
GAQM	CASST	Certified Advanced Software Security Tester	Software Development	No expiration	N/A						
GAQM	CISP	Certified Information Security Professional	General Cyber Security	5 Years	N/A						
GAQM	CISSM	Certified Information Systems Security Manager	Management	5 Years	N/A						
GAQM	CISST	Certified Information Systems Security Tester	Security Testing	No expiration	N/A						
GAQM	CPT	Certified Penetration Tester	Penetration Tester	No expiration	N/A						
GAQM	CFA	Certified Forensic Analyst	Forensics	No expiration	N/A						
GAQM	CPEH	Certified Professional Ethical Hacker	Penetration Tester	No expiration	N/A						
GAQM	ISO/IEC 27001-CIA	ISO 27001 ISMS Certified Internal Auditor	Auditing	No expiration	N/A						
GAQM	ISO/IEC 27001-27002-LA	ISO 27001-27002 Lead Auditor	Auditing	No expiration	N/A						
GAQM	ISO/IEC 27001-LA	ISO 27001:2013 ISMS Certified Lead Auditor	Auditing	No expiration	N/A						
GAQM	ISO/IEC 27001-F	ISO 27001:2013 ISMS Foundation	Standards	No expiration	N/A						
GAQM	ISO/IEC 27002-F	ISO 27002 Foundation	Standards	No expiration	N/A						
GAQM	ISO/IEC 27002-LI	ISO 27002 Lead Implementer	Standards	4 Years	N/A						
GAQM	ISO/IEC 31000-LRM	ISO 31000 Certified Lead Risk Manager	Standards	No expiration	N/A						
ISECOM	OPSA	OSSTMM Professional Security Analyst	Security Analysis	No expiration	N/A						
ISECOM	OPST	OSSTMM Professional Security Tester	Penetration Tester	No expiration	N/A						
ISECOM	OPSE	OSSTMM Professional Security Expert	General Cyber Security	No expiration	N/A						
ISECOM	OWSE	OSSTMM Wireless Security Expert	Penetration Tester	No expiration	N/A						
ISECOM	CTA	OSSTMM Certified Trust Analyst	Trust Management	No expiration	N/A						
ISECOM	SAI	Certified Security Awareness Instructor	Cyber Security Trainer	No expiration	N/A						
ISECOM	CHA	Certified Hacker Analyst	Penetration Tester	No expiration	N/A						
ISECOM	CHAT	Certified Hacker Analyst Trainer	Cyber Security Trainer	No expiration	N/A						
HISPI	HISP	Holistic Information Security Practitioner	General Cyber Security	3 Years	N/A						
Blockchain Training Alliance	CBSP	Certified Blockchain Security Professional	Blockchain	2 Years	N/A						
Crypto Consortium	CCSSA	CryptoCurrency Security Standard Auditor	Blockchain	No expiration	N/A						
The Open Group	OG0-041	Open FAIR Foundation	Risk Management	No expiration	N/A						
The Open Group	TOGAF9-F	TOGAF 9 Foundation	Security Architecture	No expiration	N/A						
The Open Group	TOGAF9-C	TOGAF 9 Certified	Security Architecture	No expiration	N/A						
Practical DevSecOps	CDP	Certified DevSecOps Professional	DevSecOps	No expiration	N/A						
Practical DevSecOps	CAISP	Certified AI Security Professional	AI Security	No expiration	N/A						
Practical DevSecOps	CCNSE	Certified Cloud Native Security Expert	Cloud-Native Security	No expiration	N/A						
Practical DevSecOps	CCSE	Certified Container Security Expert	Container Security	No expiration	N/A						
Practical DevSecOps	CTMP	Certified Threat Modeling Professional	Application Security	No expiration	N/A						
Practical DevSecOps	CASP	Certified API Security Professional	Application Security	No expiration	N/A						
Practical DevSecOps	CSSE	Certified Software Supply Chain Security Expert	Application Security	No expiration	N/A						
Practical DevSecOps	CSC	Certified Security Champion	Application Security	No expiration	N/A						
TCM Security	PJPT	Practical Junior Penetration Tester	Penetration Tester	No expiration	N/A						
TCM Security	PNPT	Practical Network Penetration Tester	Penetration Tester	No expiration	N/A						
TCM Security	PCRP	Practical Career-Ready Professional	Penetration Tester	No expiration	N/A						
TCM Security	PMPR	Practical Malware Research Professional	Malware Analysis	No expiration	N/A						
TCM Security	PORP	Practical OSINT Research Professional	Open-Source Intelligence	No expiration	N/A						
TCM Security	PIPA	Practical IoT Pentest Associate	Penetration Tester	No expiration	N/A						
TCM Security	PSAA	Practical SOC Analyst Associate	SOC Analysis	No expiration	N/A						
TCM Security	PMPA	Practical Mobile Pentest Associate	Penetration Tester	No expiration	N/A						
TCM Security	PWPA	Practical Web Pentest Associate	Penetration Tester	No expiration	N/A						
TCM Security	PWPP	Practical Web Pentest Professional	Penetration Tester	No expiration	N/A						
TCM Security	PAPA	Practical AI Pentest Professional	Penetration Tester	No expiration	N/A						
Star Certification	SCSU	Star Cyber Secure User	Security Awareness	3 years	N/A						
Star Certification	EHE	Star Certified Ethical Hacking Expert	Penetration Testing	3 years	N/A						
Star Certification	SESS	Star Expert Security Specialist	Penetration Testing	3 years	N/A						
Star Certification	SMFAS	Star Mobile Forensic and Advance Security	Forensics	3 years	N/A						
Star Certification	SPTE	Star Penetration Tester Experts	Penetration Testing	3 years	N/A						
Star Certification	SSCA	Star Secure Cyber Analytics	Penetration Testing	3 years	N/A						
Star Certification	SFICH-007	Star Forensic investigator in Computer Hacking-007	Forensics	3 years	N/A						
Star Certification	SSPE.Net	Star Secure Programmer Expert- .Net	Software Development	3 years	N/A						
Star Certification	SSPE-Java	Star Secure Programmer Expert- Java	Software Development	3 years	N/A						
Star Certification	SSPE-Android	Star Secure Programmer Expert- Android	Software Development	3 years	N/A						
Star Certification	SSPE-PHP	Star Secure Programmer Expert- PHP	Software Development	3 years	N/A						
Zero-Point Security	CRTO	Certified Red Team Operator	Red Teaming	No expiration	N/A						
Zero-Point Security	CRTL	Certified Red Team Lead	Red Teaming	No expiration	N/A						
EC First	CCSA	Certified Cyber Security Architect	Security Architecture	3 years	N/A						
EC First	CSCS	Certified Security Compliance Specialist	Risk/Compliance	3 years	N/A						
EC First	CMMP	Certified CMMC Professional	Standards	3 years	N/A						
8kSec	OMSE	Certified Offensive Mobile Security Expert	Vulnerability Research	No expiration	N/A						
8kSec	CMSE	Certified Mobile Security Engineer	Application Security	No expiration	N/A						
8kSec	CISR	Certified iOS Security Researcher	Vulnerability Research	No expiration	N/A						
8kSec	CASR	Certified Android Security Researcher	Vulnerability Research	No expiration	N/A						
8kSec	CISE	Certified iOS Security Engineer	Application Security	No expiration	N/A						
8kSec	CASE	Certified Android Security Engineer	Application Security	No expiration	N/A						
8kSec	CAISR	Certified AI Security Researcher	AI Security	No expiration	N/A						
CWNP	CWS	Certified Wireless Specialist	Wireless Security		N/A						
Hack The Box (HTB)	CBBH	Certified Bug Bounty Hunter	Bug Hunting	No expiration	N/A						
Hack The Box (HTB)	CPTS	Certified Penetration Testing Specialist	Penetration Testing	No expiration	N/A						
Hack The Box (HTB)	CDSA	Certified Defensive Security Analyst	Security Analyst	No expiration	N/A						
Hack The Box (HTB)	CWEE	Certified Web Exploitation Expert	Penetration Testing	No expiration	N/A						
Hack The Box (HTB)	CAPE	Certified Active Directory Pentesting Expert	Penetration Testing	No expiration	N/A						
TryHackMe	SAL1	Security Analyst Level 1	Security Analysis	3 years	N/A						
TryHackMe	PT1	Jr Penetration Tester	Penetration Testing	N/A	N/A						
CNITSEC	CISP-CISE	Certified Information Security Engineer	General Security	3 years	N/A						
CNITSEC	CISP-PTE	Certified Penetration Testing Engineer	Penetration Testing	3 years	N/A						
CNITSEC	CISP-IRE	Certified Incident Response Engineer	Incident Response	3 years	N/A						

=== Vendor-specific ===
Issuing Organization	Credential Abbreviation	Certification Title	Focus	Validity duration	Number issued					
Issuing Organization	Credential Abbreviation	Certification Title	Focus	Validity duration	Number issued	Cisco	CCNA Security	Cisco Certified Network Associate - Security	Network Security	3 years
CCNA CyberOps	Cisco Certified Network Associate - CyberOps					Cisco			Network Security	3 years
CCNP Security	Cisco Certified Network Professional - Security					Cisco			Network Security	3 years
CCIE Security	Cisco Certified Internetwork Expert - Security	2062				Cisco			Network Security	3 years
Check Point	CCSA	Check Point Certified Security Administrator							Network Security	
Check Point	CCSE	Check Point Certified Security Expert							Network Security	
Kali	KLCP	Kali Linux Certified Professional	Penetration Testing	No expiration	N/A					
IBM	-	IBM Certified Deployment Professional - Security Access Manager V9.0	Access Control							
IBM	-	IBM Certified Associate Administrator - Security Guardium Data Protection V10.1.2	Data Protection							
IBM	-	IBM Certified Administrator - Security Guardium V10.0	Data Protection							
IBM	-	IBM Certified Deployment Professional - Identity Governance and Intelligence V5.2	Access Control							
IBM	-	IBM Certified Analyst - i2 Analysts Notebook V9	Threat Intelligence							
IBM	-	IBM Certified SOC Analyst - IBM QRadar SIEM V7.3.2	Threat Intelligence							
IBM	-	IBM Certified Associate Analyst - IBM QRadar SIEM V7.3.2	Threat Intelligence							
IBM	-	IBM Certified Associate Administrator - IBM QRadar SIEM V7.3.2	Threat Intelligence							
IBM	-	IBM Certified Deployment Professional - IBM QRadar SIEM V7.3.2	Threat Intelligence							
IBM	-	IBM Certified Deployment Professional - Security Identity Governance and Intelligence V5.2.5	Access Control							
Microsoft	AZ-500	Microsoft Certified: Azure Security Engineer Associate	Cloud Security	1 year *						
Microsoft	MS-500	Microsoft 365 Certified: Security Administrator Associate	Cloud Security	1 year *						
Microsoft	SC-100	Microsoft Certified: Cybersecurity Architect Expert	Security Architect	1 year *						
Microsoft	SC-200	Microsoft Certified: Security Operations Analyst Associate	SIEM	1 year *						
Microsoft	SC-300	Microsoft Certified: Identity and Access Administrator Associate	IAM	1 year *						
Microsoft	SC-400	Microsoft Information Protection Administrator	Risk/Compliance	1 year *						
Microsoft	SC-900	Microsoft Certified: Security, Compliance, and Identity Fundamentals	Fundamentals	No expiration						
AWS	-	AWS Certified Security - Specialty	Cloud Security							
Google	-	Google Professional Cloud Security Engineer	Cloud Security							
Jamf	JCESA	Jamf Certified Endpoint Security Admin	macOS Security							
Alibaba	ACA	ACA Cloud Security Certification	Cloud Security							
Alibaba	ACP	ACP Cloud Security Certification	Cloud Security							
Alibaba	ACE	ACE Cloud Security Expert	Cloud Security							
Red hat	EX415	Red Hat Certified Specialist in Security: Linux	IT-Administration							
Red hat	EX425	Red Hat Certified Specialist in Security: Containers and OpenShift Container	IT-Administration							
OpenText	EnCE	EnCase Certified Examiner	Forensics							
OpenText	EnCEP	EnCase Certified eDiscovery Practitioner	Forensics							
OpenText	CFSR	EnCase Certified Forensic Security Responder	Forensics							
Fortinet	NSE 1/2/3	Network Security Professional Associate	vendor-specific products	2 years						
Fortinet	NSE 4	Network Security Professional	Firewalls	2 years						
Fortinet	NSE 5	Network Security Analyst	administration	2 years						
Fortinet	NSE 6	Network Security Specialist	vendor-specific products	2 years						
Fortinet	NSE 7	Network Security Architect	Firewalls	2 years						
Fortinet	NSE 8	Network Security Expert	Firewalls	2 years						
Juniper	JNCIA-SEC	Juniper Networks Certified Associate	Network Security	3 years						
Juniper	JNCIS-SEC	Juniper Networks Certified Specialist	Network Security	3 years						
Juniper	JNCIP-SEC	Juniper Networks Certified Professional	Network Security	3 years						
Juniper	JNCIE-SEC	Juniper Networks Certified Expert	Network Security	3 years						
Juniper	JNCDS-SEC	Juniper Networks Certified Design Specialist Security	Network Security	3 years						
Palo Alto	PCNSA	Palo Alto Networks Certified Network Security Administrator	Network Security							
Palo Alto	PCNSE	Palo Alto Networks Certified Network Security Engineer	Network Security							
Palo Alto	PCCET	Palo Alto Networks Certified Cybersecurity Entry-level Technician	General Cyber Security							
Palo Alto	PCDRA	Palo Alto Networks Certified Detection and Remediation Analyst	Network Security							
Palo Alto	PCCSE	Palo Alto Networks Prisma Certified Cloud Security Engineer	Cloud Security							
Palo Alto	PCSAE	Palo Alto Networks Certified Security Automation Engineer	Threat Intelligence							
Symantec, (since 2015 NortonLifeLock)	250-215	Administration of Symantec Messaging Gateway 10.6	Network Security							
Symantec, (since 2015 NortonLifeLock)	250-420	Administration of Symantec VIP (March 2017)	Network Security							
Symantec, (since 2015 NortonLifeLock)	250-426	Administration of Symantec Data Center Security - Server Advanced 6.7	Network Security							
Symantec, (since 2015 NortonLifeLock)	250-428	Administration of Symantec Endpoint Protection 14	Network Security							
Symantec, (since 2015 NortonLifeLock)	250-430	Administration of Blue Coat ProxySG 6.6	Network Security							
Symantec, (since 2015 NortonLifeLock)	250-433	Administration of Blue Coat Security Analytics 7.2	Network Security							
Symantec, (since 2015 NortonLifeLock)	250-438	Administration of Symantec Data Loss Prevention 15*	Network Security							
Symantec, (since 2015 NortonLifeLock)	250-440	Administration of Symantec PacketShaper 11.9.1*	Network Security							
Symantec, (since 2015 NortonLifeLock)	250-441	Administration of Symantec Advanced Threat Protection 3.0*	Network Security							
Symantec, (since 2015 NortonLifeLock)	251/250-443	Administration of Symantec CloudSOC - R2*	Network Security							
Symantec, (since 2015 NortonLifeLock)	250-444	Administration of Symantec Secure Sockets Layer Visibility 5.0*	Network Security							
Symantec, (since 2015 NortonLifeLock)	250-445	Administration of Symantec Email Security.cloud - v1*	Network Security							
Symantec, (since 2015 NortonLifeLock)	251/250-446	Administration of Symantec Web Security Service (WSS) - R1*	Network Security							
Symantec, (since 2015 NortonLifeLock)	251/250-447	Administration of Symantec Client Management Suite 8.5*	Network Security							
Symantec, (since 2015 NortonLifeLock)	251/250-551	Administration of Symantec Endpoint Detection and Response 4.1*	Network Security							
Symantec, (since 2015 NortonLifeLock)	250-556	Administration of Symantec ProxySG 6.7*	Network Security							

Microsoft 1 year *: you have to do a free refresh exam within 180 days before expiration. if not done, the certificate expire otherwise it extends by 1 year.

== See also ==
- Computer security
- Information security
- Tech ed
