= David Harley =

English author and malware researcher

- Born: 1949; UK
- Died: 29 October 2025 (aged 76)
- Education: Bangor University; Open University
- Known for: IT security research
- Scientific career
- Fields: Author; Information security Malware

David Harley is a former IT security researcher, author/editor and consultant living in the United Kingdom, known for his books on and research into malware, Mac security, anti-malware product testing and management of email abuse.

== Career ==
After a checkered career that included spells in music, bar-work, work with the mentally handicapped, retail and the building trade, Harley entered the IT field in the late 1980s, working initially in administration at the Royal Free Hospital in London, and in 1989 went to work for the Imperial Cancer Research Fund (now merged into Cancer Research UK), where he held administrative and IT support roles and eventually moved into full-time security. In 2001, he joined the National Health Service where he ran the Threat Assessment Centre. After leaving the NHS in 2006 to work as an independent consultant, he worked closely with the security company ESET where between 2011 and 2018 he held the position of Senior Research Fellow, working with the Cyber Threat Analysis Center. In 2009, he was elected to the board of directors of the Anti-Malware Testing Standards Organization (AMTSO). He stood down in February 2012, when Righard Zwienenberg, president of AMTSO, joined ESET, as the AMTSO bylaws don't allow more than one Board member to represent the same AMTSO member entity. He ran the Mac Virus website, and formerly held an undefined executive role in AVIEN. He is a former Fellow of the British Computer Society: he explained in a blog article in 2014 that he was dropping his subscriptions to the BCS Institute and (ISC)2 (and therefore would no longer be entitled to continue using the acronyms CISSP, CITP and FBCS), and his reasons for so doing.

In January 2019, he announced that he was no longer working with ESET and was reverting to his former career as a musician, but indicated that he was still available for one-off authoring and editing work. He subsequently contributed content, reviewing and translation for the English edition of the book Cyberdanger by Eddy Willems.

== Writing ==
Harley was co-author (with Robert Slade and Urs Gattiker) of Viruses Revealed, and technical editor and principal author of The AVIEN Malware Defense Guide for the Enterprise.

He also contributed chapters to a number of other security-related books, and sometimes wrote for specialist security publishers such as Virus Bulletin and Elsevier. He has often presented papers at specialist security conferences including Virus Bulletin, AVAR, and EICAR. Until the end of 2018 he blogged regularly for ESET, and on occasion for Infosecurity Magazine, SC Magazine, (ISC)2, SecuriTeam, Mac Virus, and Small Blue-Green World. His Geek Peninsula metablog lists many of his papers and articles.

== Other work ==
Some recordings, miscellaneous prose and verse are posted to or linked from his personal blog page.

Miscellaneous prose – some but not all connected to the security industry – is posted to the Miscellaneous Prose page.

== Family life ==
Harley was born in Shropshire and educated at the Priory Grammar School for Boys, Shrewsbury. He hardly ever talks publicly about his private life, but a biographical article for Virus Bulletin, and the dedications page to Viruses Revealed indicate that he has a daughter. He lived with his third wife in Cornwall, in the UK until his death in October 2025.

== Bibliography ==
- Harley, David (2024). Facebook: Sins & Insensitivities. Wheal alice. ISBN 979-8878754736. Sole author.
- Willems, Eddy (2019). Cyberdanger. Springer. ISBN 978-3-030-04531-9. (Contributed content and some editing and translation.)
- Bidgoli, Hossein; et al. (2008). The Handbook of Computer Networks. Wiley. ISBN 978-0-471-78460-9. Volume 3, "E-Mail Threats and Vulnerabilities."
- Baccas, Paul; et al. (2008). OS X Exploits and Defense. Syngress. ISBN 978-1-59749-254-6. Chapter 3: "Malicious Macs: Malware and the Mac." Chapter 4: "Malware Detection and the Mac."
- Harley, David; et al. (2007). AVIEN Malware Defense Guide for the Enterprise. Syngress. ISBN 978-1-59749-164-8. (Editor, technical editor, several chapters.)
- Schiller, Craig A., Binkley, Jim; et al. (2007). Botnets: the Killer Web App. Syngress. ISBN 978-1-59749-135-8. Co-wrote Chapter 5, "Botnet Detection: Tools and Techniques" with Jim Binkley.
- Bidgoli, Hossein; et al. (2006). Handbook of Information Security. Wiley. ISBN 0-471-64833-7. Volume 3, "E-Mail Threats and Vulnerabilities."
- Paulus, S., Pohlmann N., Reimer, H.; et al. (2004). ISSE 2004: Securing Electronic Business Processes. Vieweg. ISBN 978-3-528-05910-1. Massmailers: New Threats Need Novel Anti-Virus Measures.
- Bosworth, Seymour, Kabay M.E.; et al. (2002). Computer Security Handbook. John Wiley. ISBN 0-471-41258-9. Co-wrote Chapter 49, "Medical Records Security" with Paul Brusil.
- Anonymous; et al. (2002). Maximum Security Fourth Edition. SAMS. ISBN 0-672-32459-8. Revised Chapter 17 "Viruses and Worms", Chapter 18 "Trojans."
- Anonymous; et al. (2001). Maximum Security Third Edition. SAMS. ISBN 0-672-31871-7. Chapter 17 "Viruses and Worms", Chapter 18 "Trojans."
- Harley, David, Robert Slade and Urs E. Gattiker (2001). Viruses Revealed. McGraw-Hill Companies. ISBN 0-07-213090-3. Co-Author.

A book of verse and a number of books on musical, historical and occasionally IT-related topics are linked from Harley's Wheal Alice blog.

== Papers ==
Harley published white papers, conference papers and presentations, and on-line articles with or on behalf of ESET between 2006 and 2018. Some previous and subsequent papers, articles and presentations are available from his Geek Peninsula blog.
