= Robert Slade =

Canadian information scientist

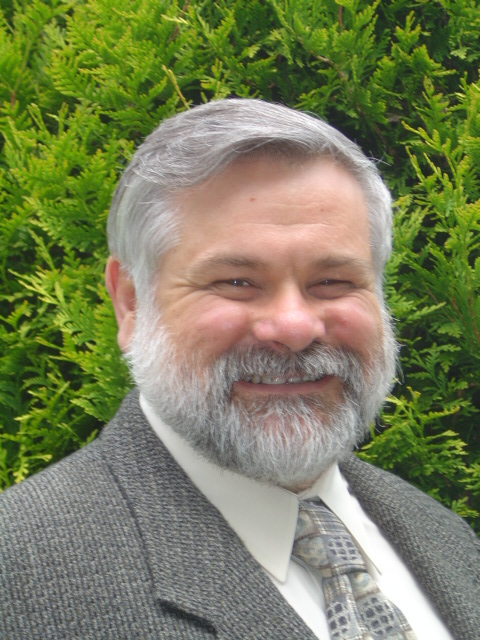
- Education: University of British Columbia; University of Oregon; Regent College
- Scientific career
- Fields: Information security Malware; Professional certification

Robert Michael Slade, also known as Robert M. Slade and Rob Slade, is a Canadian information security consultant, researcher and instructor. He is the author of Robert Slade's Guide to Computer Viruses, Software Forensics, Dictionary of Information Security and co-author of Viruses Revealed. Slade is the author of thousands of technical book reviews, today published on the techbooks mailing list and in the RISKS Digest, and archived in his Internet Review Project. An expert on computer viruses and malware, he is also the Mr. Slade of "Mr. Slade's lists".

== Family and education ==
Slade married Gloria J. Slade (deceased December 22, 2021) who edited much of his work and was the editor of Slade's book reviews. He holds a bachelor's degree from the University of British Columbia, a master's in computer and information science education from the University of Oregon and a diploma in Christian studies from Regent College.

== Malware and forensics ==
Slade became one of a small number of researchers who can be called the world's experts on malware. Fred Cohen named Slade's early work organizing computer viruses, software, BBSes and book reviews Mr. Slade's lists. Slade is one of fewer than thirty people worldwide who are credited for contributions in the final version of the VIRUS-L FAQ, which, with the Usenet group comp.virus and the VIRUS-L mailing list, was the public group of record for computer virus issues from 1988 to 1995. Until 1996 he maintained the Antiviral Software Evaluation FAQ, a quick reference for users seeking antivirus software and a vendor contacts list. He was a contributor as well to at least three other group computer virus FAQs before the Web came to prominence. He has written two books about viruses: he was sole author of Robert Slade's Guide to Computer Viruses, first published in 1994 (2nd edition 1996) and co-wrote Viruses Revealed with David Harley and Urs Gattiker in 2001.

Slade advanced the field of computer forensics when through his antivirus research he found that the intentions and identity of virus authors can be discovered in their program code. He created the first course ever offered in forensic programming. His book Software Forensics was published in 2004 and his chapter on the subject is in print in the Information Security Management Handbook as of the fifth edition.

== Information security ==
Today Slade is a consultant to businesses and government—among his client list are Fortune 500 companies and the government of Canada—as well as to educational institutions. Slade creates seminars for local, federal and international training groups. He is a senior instructor for (ISC)² where he develops courses in information security and quality assurance (QA) for those who seek certification. Slade himself is one of the world's approximately 60,000 CISSPs, a certification used in private industry as well as, at least in the United States, in government and defense.

Slade moved his online security glossary in 2006 to the book Dictionary of Information Security. Virus Bulletin remarked about the unusual collection of five forewords, "that so many acknowledged experts are willing to contribute says something about the author's standing in the field"—the forewords were written by Fred Cohen, Jack Holleran, Peter G. Neumann, Harold Tipton and Gene Spafford. The dictionary is considered to be "dependable baseline definitions" and a "citable, common source".

== Internet Review Project ==
Slade has "surveyed most of the literature" in his field and shared his knowledge in the Internet Review Project, a collection of his published book reviews. While his first priority to information security, he reviews works in other fields as well. His reviews are often critical; to the project FAQ question "Don't you like any books?", Slade replies "I'm a cruel reviewer. But fair!"

== Bibliography ==
- Slade, Robert (2021). Cybersecurity Lessons from CoVID-19. CRC Press. ISBN 978-0367682699.
- Slade, Robert (2006). Dictionary of Information Security. Syngress. ISBN 1-59749-115-2.
- Slade, Robert M. (2004). Software Forensics : Collecting Evidence from the Scene of a Digital Crime. McGraw-Hill Professional. ISBN 0-07-142804-6.
- Harley, David; Slade, Slade; Gattiker, Urs E. (2001). Viruses Revealed. McGraw-Hill Companies. ISBN 0-07-213090-3.
- Slade, Robert (1996). Robert Slade's Guide to Computer Viruses: How to Avoid Them, How to Get Rid of Them, and How to Get Help (2 ed.). Springer. ISBN 0-387-94311-0.
