= EITC =

EITC may refer to:

- Earned Income Tax Credit
- East India Trading Company
- Easton Intermodal Transportation Center, a bus terminal in Easton, Pennsylvania
- Emirates Integrated Telecommunications Company, or 'du' is a telecommunications company in the United Arab Emirates
- European Information Technologies Certification, an international ICT qualifications certification standard
