= Principles of Information Security =

Textbook

Principles of Information Security is a textbook written by Michael Whitman and Herbert Mattord and published by Course Technology.

It is in widespread use in higher education in the United States as well as in many English-speaking countries.

== Editions ==
=== First edition ===
The initial edition of this text was published in 2002.

=== Second edition ===
The second edition was published in 2004.

=== Third edition ===
The third edition was published in 2008. The bound text contained 550 pages.

=== Fourth edition ===
Publication Date: January 1, 2011; Authors: Michael E. Whitman, Herbert J. Mattord. ISBN 978-1-111-13821-9

=== Fifth edition ===
Publication date: November 18, 2014; Authors: Michael E. Whitman, Herbert J. Mattord. ISBN 978-1285448367

=== Sixth edition ===
Publication Date: January 2018; Authors: Michael E. Whitman, Herbert J. Mattord. ISBN 978-1337578769

=== Seventh edition ===
Publication Date: July 2021; Authors: Michael E. Whitman, Herbert J. Mattord. ISBN 9780357506493

== Authors ==
- Michael E. Whitmam, Ph.D., CISM, CISSP. Cengage biography can be found at .
- Herbert J. Mattord, CISM, CISSP. Cengage biography can be found at .

=== Other book projects ===
- Whitman, M. E. & Mattord, H. J., Hands-On Information Security Lab Manual, 3rd ed. © 2009 Course Technology, Boston, MA, ISBN 1-4354-4156-7
- Whitman, M. E. & Mattord, H. J., Principles of Incident Response and Disaster Recovery, © 2006 Course Technology, Boston, MA, ISBN 1-4188-3663-X
- Whitman, M. E. & Mattord, H., Management of Information Security, 3rd ed. © 2010 Course Technology, Boston, MA, ISBN 978-1-4354-8884-7, Note that this text has been adopted at over 100 institutions globally and is recommended by ASIS as a means to prepare for the CPP certification examination
- Whitman, M. E. & Mattord, H., Management of Information Security, 2nd ed. © 2007 Course Technology, Boston, MA, ISBN 978-1-4239-0130-3
- Whitman, M. E. & Mattord, H.J., Management of Information Security, © 2004 Course Technology, Boston, MA, ISBN 0-619-21515-1
- Whitman, M. E., and Mattord, H. J., Guide to Firewalls and VPNs © 2011 Course Technology, Boston, MA, contract pending
- Whitman, M.E. & Mattord, H. J., Readings and Cases in the Management of Information Security, © 2005 Course Technology, Boston, MA, ISBN 0-619-21627-1
- Whitman, M.E. & Mattord, H. J., Readings and Cases in the Management of Information Security: Law & Ethics, © 2009 Course Technology, Boston, MA, ISBN 1-4354-4157-5

Dr. Whitman and Professor Mattord, working with others have collaborated on the following projects:

- Whitman, M. E., Shackleford, D. & Mattord, H.J., Hands-On Information Security Lab Manual, 2nd ed. © 2005 Course Technology, Boston, MA, ISBN 0-619-21631-X
- Whitman, M. E., Mattord, H. J., & Austin, R.D., Guide to Firewalls and Network Security: Intrusion Detection and VPNs © 2009 Course Technology, Boston, MA, ISBN 1-4354-2016-0
