= SLPowers =

IT managed services provider

SL Powers Computer Consultants
- Trade name: SLPowers
- Company type: Managed IT Services, Security, Storage & Virtualization
- Industry: Information Technologies
- Founded: 1985
- Founder: Steven L. Powers
- Fate: Merged with True Digital Security in March 2018
- Headquarters: West Palm Beach, Florida, United States
- Area served: United States and The Caribbean
- Key people: Rory V. Sanchez (CEO)
- Services: Guaranteed Networks, GN on Demand, Network Assurance
- Number of employees: 40+

SLPowers was an American information technology (IT) services provider headquartered in West Palm Beach, Florida. At times, the company also had offices in Atlanta, GA and Norfolk, CT. Its flagship service offering was a managed IT/Cloud and Security platform aimed at effectively managing small and medium business IT infrastructure systems based on the Windows, OS X, and Linux operating systems.

== Company history ==
=== 1985–2018 ===
SLPowers Computer Consultants Inc. was founded in 1985 by Steven L. Powers. It was acquired by A/G Technologies Inc. in March 2000 and continued doing business as "SLPowers."

In June 2005, SLPowers acquired Boca Raton, Florida based Gator Technologies.

Triggered by a corporate structure change, beginning 2010, SLPowers became a trade name for Extensible Computing LLC. Then, in 2015, Extensible Computing LLC became a wholly owned subsidiary of Network Security Partners LLC.

== Services ==
SLPowers began as a traditional hardware VAR (value added reseller) and IT Professional Services company. SLPowers had become well-known in the early days of computer networking as a Novell Gold Partner. In the late 1990s, before acquiring SLPowers, A/G Technologies Inc. had begun to develop its "flat rate service contract" which quickly evolved into one of the first managed services providers in the US. In 2007, SLPowers was awarded an Industry Contribution Award by CompTIA, the Computing Technology Industry Association, for their pioneering work in IT managed services and for their willingness to share best practices with other IT services providers.

== Merger and name retirement ==
The SLPowers trade name remained in use until March 2018, when Network Security Partners LLC (Florida) and True Digital Security Inc. (Oklahoma) performed a "merger of equals" to form a new Delaware corporation, also called True Digital Security Inc. At that time, Extensible Computing LLC became a wholly owned subsidiary of the new True Digital Security Inc. and the name SLPowers was retired.
