= NANO Antivirus =

Russian antivirus software

- Release: 2009
- Stable release: 1.0
- Operating system: Microsoft Windows
- Available in: Russian, English
- Type: Antivirus
- Website: nano-av.com

NANO Antivirus is a Russian antivirus software developed by NANO Security Ltd. The software has free and paid (NANO Antivirus Pro) versions. NANO Security is a Russian company founded in 2009 by a team which has developed and implemented antivirus software since 2003.

NANO Security Ltd is integrated into Security and Maintenance of Microsoft. The company was included in Microsoft's list of reputable anti-malware producers until 2022.

The software is intended for use in homes and small businesses. In 2017, NANO Antivirus Pro was included in the Russian Software Registry of the Ministry of Telecom and Mass Communications of the Russian Federation.

== Awards ==
NANO Antivirus failed to pass the VB100 certification on the first attempt, but has since earned five consecutive VB100 awards. The award streak was interrupted when they failed the certification test, but then NANO Antivirus earned two more VB100 including the last certification. The VB100 team commended the product's quality.

== Other products of the company based on the NANO Antivirus technologies ==
- NANO Antivirus Pro – the paid version of NANO Antivirus with extended functionality, it uses the dynamic licensing model.
- NANO Antivirus White Label - the platform for developing of co-branded versions of NANO Antivirus.
- NANO Antivirus Engine (SDK) – the product for development of independent third-party antivirus solutions based on the NANO Antivirus technology. This product also allows to integrate the antivirus technology into existing third-party solutions.
- NANO Antivirus Sky Scan – the Windows Store application for Windows 8/10 which provides easy-to-use access to NANO Antivirus cloud scan service. If the desktop version of NANO Antivirus is installed on the target device, NANO Antivirus Sky Scan can also be used as a native metro-style shell for the desktop solution.
- NANO Antivirus Online Scanner – the web application which allows any user to scan suspicious file right in his web browser. The functional of Online Scanner is also available as a special web form for embedding to third-party sites.

== Online scanners ==
NANO Antivirus is integrated into the following online scanners: VirusTotal, OPSWAT Metadefender, and VirScan.org as Engine Supplier and certified partner.

== Patents ==
The technologies of NANO Security are patented in Europe, USA, Russia, China and other countries.
