= AVIEN =

AVIEN is nominally an acronym for Anti-Virus Information Exchange Network, although that expansion is rarely used.

== History ==
The group arose out of discussions following a presentation by Robert S. Vibert at a Virus Bulletin Conference in 2000 when antivirus specialists from companies including Nortel, Boeing and Prudential decided to implement a forum where they could freely share information concerning AV companies, products, and upcoming malware, including an email-based Early Warning System.

Initially, members of AVIEN were individuals responsible for the security of organizations with a minimum of 1,500 PCs in their care, and excluded antivirus vendors but in 2002 a companion organization AVIEWS (Anti-Virus Information and Early Warning System) was formed which included all members of AVIEN but also encouraged the participation of security vendors and other interested parties.

In 2007, Syngress published the AVIEN Malware Defense Guide for the Enterprise with contributions by members of AVIEN and AVIEWS.

The two organizations merged in 2008 under the leadership of Andrew Lee (CEO) and David Harley (COO). In 2011, following his taking up the role of CEO at ESET, Lee announced that he was leaving the running of AVIEN to David Harley, signing himself "(former) AVIEN CEO".

By 2012 the organization had declined to a low-traffic mailing list, a rarely updated web site, and occasional additions to the blog, including resource pages on security topics such as tech support scams and ransomware. Since David Harley's near-complete withdrawal from the security industry in 2019 little has been heard from the AVIEN community, or is expected to be heard.
