= National Initiative for Cybersecurity Education =

American government program for cybersecurity education

National Initiative for Cybersecurity Education (NICE)
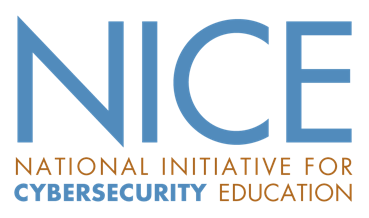

Agency overview
- Headquarters: Gaithersburg, Maryland, U.S. 39°07′59″N 77°13′25″W
- Agency executive: Rodney Petersen, Director of the National Initiative for Cybersecurity Education
- Parent agency: NIST, Department of Commerce
- Website: www.nist.gov/nice

The National Initiative for Cybersecurity Education (NICE) is a partnership between government, academia, and the private sector focused supporting the country's ability to address current and future cybersecurity education and workforce challenges through standards and best practices. NICE is led by the National Institute of Standards and Technology (NIST) in the U.S. Department of Commerce.

== History ==
The Comprehensive National Cybersecurity Initiative (CNCI), established by President George W. Bush in January 2008, included over twelve Initiatives, one of which, Initiative 8, was aimed at making the Federal cybersecurity workforce better prepared to handle cybersecurity challenges.

In May 2009, the Cyberspace Policy Review, directed by President Barack Obama, elevated the CNCI Initiative 8, which had initially been focused on improving the Federal cybersecurity workforce's ability to perform cybersecurity work. The scope was expanded beyond the Federal workforce to include the private sector workforce, truly making it a national charge.

In March 2010, the Obama administration declassified limited material regarding the CNCI, making Initiative 8 public: Initiative #8. Expand cyber education. While billions of dollars are being spent on new technologies to secure the U.S. Government in cyberspace, it is the people with the right knowledge, skills, and abilities to implement those technologies who will determine success. However there are not enough cybersecurity experts within the Federal Government or private sector to implement the CNCI, nor is there an adequately established Federal cybersecurity career field. Existing cybersecurity training and personnel development programs, while good, are limited in focus and lack unity of effort. In order to effectively ensure our continued technical advantage and future cybersecurity, we must develop a technologically-skilled and cyber-savvy workforce and an effective pipeline of future employees. It will take a national strategy, similar to the effort to upgrade science and mathematics education in the 1950s, to meet this challenge. Additionally, the CNCI described training, education, and professional development programs as lacking "unity of effort".

Cybersecurity Enhancement Act of 2014 Title IV established the "National cybersecurity awareness and education program", which is now known as the National Initiative for Cybersecurity Education (NICE).

== Organization ==
NICE is headquartered at NIST facilities in Gaithersburg, Maryland. The NICE Program Office activities are organized into three categories: government engagement, industry engagement, and academic engagement.

== See also ==
- Cyber security standards
- List of computer security certifications
