= Comprehensive National Cybersecurity Initiative =

2008 U.S. cybersecurity goals (NSPD-54/HSPD-23)

The Comprehensive National Cybersecurity Initiative (CNCI) outlines U.S. cybersecurity goals across multiple agencies including the Department of Homeland Security, the Office of Management and Budget, and the National Security Agency. The initiative was established by President George W. Bush in January 2008 in National Security Presidential Directive 54/Homeland Security Presidential Directive 23 (NSPD-54/HSPD-23).

== Details ==
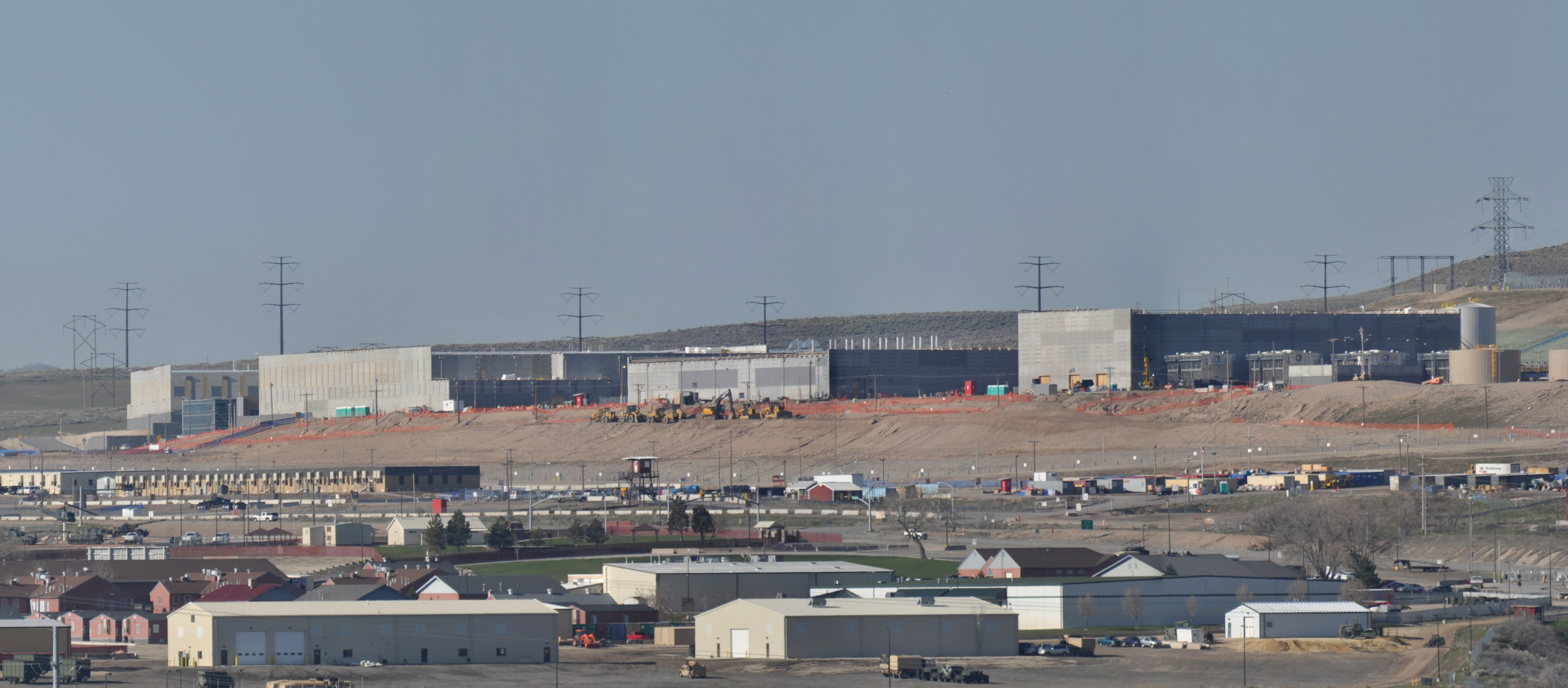
Utah Data Center, Bluffdale, Utah

During 2008, the initial signing of the initiative and hearings about the initiative was kept classified. However, in March 2010, the Obama administration declassified limited material about the project.

The goals of the initiative include: establishing a front line of defense against network intrusion; defending the U.S. against the full spectrum of threats through counterintelligence; and strengthening the future cybersecurity environment through education, coordination and research.

The main actions of the CNCI are:

- creating or enhancing shared situational awareness within the federal government, and with other government agencies and the private sector;
- creating or enhancing the ability to respond quickly to prevent intrusions;
- enhancing counterintelligence capabilities;
- increasing the security of the supply chain for key information technologies;
- expanding cyber education;
- coordinating and redirecting research and development efforts; and
- developing deterrence strategies.

On January 6, 2011, the National Security Agency (NSA) began building the first of a series of data centers pursuant to the program. The $1.5 billion Community Comprehensive National Cybersecurity Initiative Data Center, also known as the Utah Data Center, is located at Camp Williams, Utah.

== See also ==
- National Security Directive
- United States Department of Homeland Security
- National Cybersecurity Center
- Presidential Policy Directive 20
- National Initiative for Cybersecurity Education
