= Technical trainer =

A technical trainer is an educator or teacher who trains or coaches others in some field of technology. The task requires a certain set of competencies, but many technical trainers do not hold specific technical-training qualifications. Although there are professional organizations and publications of relevance to technical trainers, few of these are specifically focused on that profession.

== Types of technical trainers ==
Although a generic professional description can be applied to all technical trainers, as is true of any profession, many specializations exist. These include information technology topics such as Computer applications and Computer Architecture and Design; biomedical technology; educational technology; Aerospace technology; and topics in the field of engineering.

== History ==
The need for technical training existed before computers or even electronics, but the term "technical trainer" has only been in the common lexicon since the mid-20th century. For example, RAF Technical Training Command was a distinct unit between 1940 and 1968, providing training in aircraft maintenance and other non-flying activities to British forces.

== Competencies ==
It is often pointed out that effective technical trainers need qualities over and above technical mastery. They need to have skills in working with people, and knowledge of a range of training techniques. The former National Skill Standards Board in the United States developed a set of skill standards for technical trainers.

== Certification ==
Currently, competence frameworks for technical trainers are not well developed. Among those technical trainers who have university degrees, the most frequent degree is in education; but many technical trainers are not formally qualified in the field.

Several organizations do provide certification for teachers and other educators in technology. For example, the American trade association CompTIA provides the CTT+ (Certified Technical Trainer) qualification, which is internationally recognized for trainers in the information technology field.

== Professional organizations ==
The Association for Talent Development, formerly American Society for Training and Development, is a non-profit association for workplace learning and performance professionals. It organizes two regular international conferences relevant to technical trainers: its national convention, and the Techknowledge Conference on e-learning. Up to the mid-1990s it published a magazine and hosted a conference specifically for technical trainers.

The International Society for Performance Improvement (ISPI) organizes an annual conference and other educational events, publishes books and periodicals, and supports research in performance improvement in the workplace.

== See also ==
- Vocational education
