= European Information Technologies Certification =

The European Information Technologies Certification (EITC) programme is an international professional information and communications technology (ICT) knowledge and skills certification standard. It is developed and governed by the EITCI Institute, a non-profit organization based in Brussels that provides certification of individuals' knowledge and skills in narrow, specialized, single-subject areas of ICT such as office software, computer-aided project management, online collaboration systems, and raster graphics processing.

== See also ==
- EITCA programme
- EITCI institute
