= InfoSec Institute =

American cybersecurity training company

- Industry: Cybersecurity education
- Founded: 2004
- Founder: Jack Koziol
- Headquarters: United States
- Services: Professional certification training; Technical skills training; Security awareness training; Phishing simulations
- Parent: Cengage Group
- Website: www.infosecinstitute.com

InfoSec Institute is a technology training company providing training courses for security professionals, businesses, agencies and technology professionals.

Infosec, formerly known as Infosec Institute, has been a trusted training provider for over 20 years, helping thousands of IT and security professionals advance their careers and strengthen their organizations’ security posture.

Infosec's IT Certification Boot Camps are intensive, instructor-led programs designed to help IT and cybersecurity professionals quickly earn industry-recognized certifications.

The company's training library provides multi-course tracks by job function, certification-specific training and short-form, continuing education training. Its course library includes over 95 courses covering topics like ethical hacking, network security, mobile forensics and more.

Infosec IQ is a security awareness training (SAT) platform designed to help organizations reduce cyber risks by educating employees on threats like phishing, social engineering, and data breaches. It includes customizable training modules, phishing simulations, and real-time user risk scoring to improve security behaviors.

Infosec Skills is an on-demand cybersecurity training platform for IT and security professionals, offering hands-on labs, certification prep, and guided learning paths. It provides training for various security roles, from entry-level to advanced practitioners, helping teams stay ahead of evolving cyber threats.

== History ==
Before founding Infosec Institute in 2004, Koziol worked in a bank's security department and gave talks on cybersecurity following the publication of The Shellcoder's Handbook. The company's early courses were boot camps on ethical hacking.

In April 2019, the company launched Infosec Skills, an online training platform with learning paths mapped to the NICE Cybersecurity Workforce Framework.

On 31 January 2022, Cengage Group announced an agreement to acquire Infosec for US$190.8 million. The transaction closed on 28 February 2022. Cengage announced its completion on 1 March, when Infosec joined ed2go in the group's Workforce Skills business.

In April 2022, Infosec partnered with VetJobs to offer three annual cybersecurity training scholarships for veterans and military spouses. The scholarships included lifetime access to Infosec Skills.

== See also ==
- Cyber security
