= European Information Technologies Certification Academy =

Information technology certification

European Information Technologies Certification Academy (EITCA) programme is an international professional ICT knowledge and skills certification standard at EQF Level 6, in accordance with the European Qualifications Framework. The programmes are developed and governed by the EITCI Institute – a non-profit organization based in Brussels, that provides certification of individuals' knowledge and skills in broad field-oriented areas of ICT expertise such as Computer graphics, Information security etc. The EITCA programmes, referred to as EITCA Academies, include selected sets of several to over a dozen of individual EITC programmes, that together comprise a particular area of qualifications.

== EITCA Academies ==
As of June 2015 the EITCA certification standard includes the following Academies:

A list of EITCA Academy certification programmes
Code name	Full name
EITCA/BI	EITCA Business Information Technologies Academy
EITCA/CG	EICTA Computer Graphics Academy
EITCA/EG	EITCA e-Government Information Technologies Academy
EITCA/EL	EITCA e-Learning Didactics Technologies Academy
EITCA/IS	EITCA Information Technologies Security Academy
EITCA/KC	EITCA Information Technologies Key Competencies Academy
EITCA/TC	EITCA Information Technologies Telework Competencies Academy
EITCA/WD	EITCA Information Technologies Web Development Academy
EITCA/AI	EITCA Information Technologies Artificial Intelligence Academy

== See also ==
- EITC programme
- EITCI institute
- European Qualifications Framework
