= Cengage Group =

American educational products company

Cengage
- Traded as: Grey Market: CNGO
- Founded: 2007; 19 years ago
- Headquarters location: Boston, Massachusetts, United States
- Key people: Michael Hansen (CEO)
- Publication types: Educational content, technology, and services
- Imprints: Nelson; ed2go; Gale; Milady; Cengage MindTap; National Geographic Learning; Thorndike Press; Infosec; Ready To Hire
- Revenue: ▲US$1.5 billion (2023)
- No. of employees: 3,800 (2026)
- Official website: cengagegroup.com

Cengage Group is an American educational content, technology, and services company. Its headquarters is located in Boston, Massachusetts.

== History ==
International Thomson Publishing entered the publishing business in 1979 with the acquisition of Wadsworth Publishing. The company acquired the publishing operations of Litton Industries in 1981, including Van Nostrand Reinhold and Delmar. They also acquired Gale Research in 1985, South-Western Publishing from SFN in 1986, Course Technology in 1992, and educational reference publisher Peterson's In 1997. Van Nostrand Reinhold was later sold to John Wiley & Sons.

In 2000, Thomson Learning was created out of a restructuring of International Thomson Publishing. Later that year Thomson acquired the higher education title of Harcourt from Reed Elsevier, and the test prep publisher Arco from IDG Books. In 2002, Wadsworth acquired F.E. Peacock Publishers. It was announced on October 25, 2006, that Thomson Learning would be offered for sale by the Thomson Corporation, with an estimated value of up to US$5 billion. The company was bought by a private equity consortium consisting of Apax Partners and OMERS Capital Partners for US$7.75 billion, and the name was changed to Cengage Learning on July 24, 2007. In 2007, Cengage Learning sold Peterson's to Nelnet.

In 2011, Cengage Learning acquired the National Geographic Society's school publishing unit, and combined this school business with the Global ELT business to create and launch the National Geographic Learning brand. The global brand combined the former Cengage Learning ELT and National Geographic School Publishing imprints and sub-brands under one unified identity.

In September 2013, David Shaffer retired as chairman of the company. He had previously been executive vice president of The Thomson Corporation from 2005 to 2006, and then President and CEO of both Thomson Publishing International and Thomson Learning.

The company had acquired significant debt during its initial buyout and subsequent acquisitions, and experienced declining revenues as the market for paper textbooks contracted. Cengage Learning filed for bankruptcy under Chapter 11 on July 2, 2013. Cengage Learning emerged from bankruptcy on April 1, 2014, eliminating approximately $4 billion of its funded debt and securing $1.75 billion in exit financing. Post-bankruptcy, the company decided to focus on developing digital study guides and other educational supplements, as well as hard-copy textbooks. The company moved its headquarters from Stamford, Connecticut, to Boston.

In January 2015, they announced expansion of their LearnLaunch Accelerator program, which provides seed funding and intensive coaching to promising startups, to the University of Chihuahua in Mexico.

In November 2016, Cengage Learning rebranded as simply Cengage.

In May 2019, Cengage announced its potential merger with another major publisher, McGraw-Hill Education, thereby creating a duopoly with Pearson in the market and would have used McGraw-Hill as the merged corporate name with Michael Hansen as CEO. It is estimated Cengage has 24% of the market while McGraw-Hill has 21%, Pearson, the current market leader, has about 40 percent of the market and Wiley has about 7 percent. The merger was called off on May 1, 2020.

In August 2021, Cengage rebranded as Cengage Group.

In May 2026, major publishers including Cengage sued Meta Platforms, alleging that Meta used their books and journal articles, without their permission, to train Llama.

In January 2026, Cengage announced a confidential submission of a draft registration statement to the SEC related to their proposed public offering.

=== Acquisitions ===
In addition to organic growth, Cengage has expanded through acquisitions within the publishing industry. Notable acquisitions include:

Date of acquisition announced	Asset acquired	Industry
March 1, 2004	Education to Go	Online continuing education courses
May 16, 2008	PAL Publications	Professional reference series
June 2, 2008	Houghton Mifflin College Division	Publishing for 2- and 4-year colleges
July 17, 2008	Gatlin Education Services	Web-based training for education providers
December 16, 2008	HighBeam Research	Paid search engine of newspapers and magazines
August 1, 2011	National Geographic School Publishing	Publishing for K-12 schools and English language programs
September 2015	Learning Objects, Inc	Learning management systems and adaptive education tools
October 2015	Pathbrite, Inc	ePortfolio services for learning, reflection, and career advancement
September 2016	WebAssign	Online instructional application for faculty and students
March 2022	InfoSec Institute	Cybersecurity training
January 2025	Visible Body	Interactive 3D computer generated models of anatomy and physiology

== Products ==
The company's product lines include Cengage MindTap, Gale, Nelson, National Geographic Learning, Big Ideas Learning, Thorndike Press, ed2go, Infosec, Ready to Hire and Milady.

On December 5, 2017, Cengage announced Cengage Unlimited, a subscription service that allows students to pay for access to the company's entire digital higher education catalog by the semester or year, rather than buying individual textbooks. This service became available during summer 2018, and was reported to be "in line with expectations" with its initial sales goal. The University of Missouri is the first university to offer this plan to all students, effective January 2019.

Since 2015, South-Western products have been branded as Cengage Learning.

== Rankings ==
In 2024, based on its 2015 revenues, Publishers Weekly ranked the company 15 out of 47 publishers worldwide, based on revenues of $1,503,000,000 (US). The list includes both trade and educational publishers.

== See also ==
- Books in the United States
