= China Information Technology Security Evaluation Center =

13th Bureau of the Chinese Ministry of State Security devoted to cyber operations

- 中国信息安全测评中心 (Chinese)

Bureau overview
- Formed: 1997
- Jurisdiction: Government of China
- Headquarters: Building 1, Yard No.8, Shangdi West Road, Haidian District, Beijing, China
- Employees: classified
- Parent Ministry: Ministry of State Security
- Child Bureau: Chinese National Vulnerability Database
- Website: www.itsec.gov.cn

The China Information Technology Security Evaluation Center (Chinese: 中国信息安全测评中心; CNITSEC, SNIT-sec) is the cover identity of the 13th Bureau of the Ministry of State Security, the information technology component of China's civilian spy agency which houses much of its technical cyber expertise. The bureau manages much of the conduct of cyberespionage for the agency, and provides aid to the many advanced persistent threats (APTs) run directly by the agency, by its semi-autonomous provincial State Security Departments (SSD) and municipal State Security Bureaus (SSB), and by contractors. In support of provincial state and party leadership, the bureau also runs its own semi-autonomous provincial Information Technology Security Evaluation Centers (ITSEC) in collaboration with provincial counterparts. In the past these ITSECs have been identified collaborating with APTs run by provincial state security units. The bureau also manages the Chinese National Vulnerability Database (CNNVD), where it has been found to selectively suppress or delay public reporting of certain zero-day vulnerabilities.

== Operations ==
CNITSEC is used by the MSS to "conduct vulnerability testing and software reliability assessments." Per a 2009 U.S. State Department cable, it is believed China may also use vulnerabilities derived from CNITSEC's activities in intelligence operations.

Many believe that government requirements for CNITSEC to conduct "security reviews" of all foreign tech imports are intended to allow the MSS to identify zero-day vulnerabilities in the technology for use in intelligence operations, and force foreign companies to transfer proprietary technology and intellectual property to the MSS in exchange for access to Chinese markets.

== Chinese National Vulnerability Database ==
CNNVD is one of two national vulnerability databases operated by the PRC. According to Kristin Del Rosso of Sophos, "they have a history of strategically hoarding vulnerabilities." Recorded Future uncovered more than 200 vulnerability disclosures that had their original publication dates altered in a "sloppy coverup" following their discovery that vulnerabilities disclosure dates lagged reporting.

== Advanced persistent threat involvement ==
In November 2016, a US Department of Defense report leaked, exposing the clients of Boyusec, a Guangzhou-based company responsible for the advanced persistent threat known as APT3. According to the Pentagon's report, Boyusec was actually a front for the MSS, who was working with Huawei to produce compromised security products with built-in backdoors that would allow Chinese intelligence "to capture data and control computer and telecommunications equipment." The front's other client was Guangdong ITSEC, the Guangdong State Security Department's affiliate office of CNITSEC.

== Professional Certifications ==
The China Information Technology Security Evaluation Center (CNITSEC) administers a series of nationally recognized cybersecurity certifications. These are designed to standardize professional capabilities and improve the skills of practitioners working in information and cybersecurity across China.

=== Certified Information Security Professional (CISP) ===
The CISP certification framework covers a broad range of topics in information security governance, management, and technical implementation. It's a mid-to-senior-level certification program administered by CNITSEC. Candidates must complete formal training and pass a written exam. Some tracks also include a practical test to evaluate real-world technical skills.

- CISP – Certified Information Security Engineer (CISP-CISE): Focuses on the design and maintenance of secure systems. It covers network architecture, system hardening, intrusion detection, and security engineering practices.
- CISP – Penetration Testing Engineer (CISP-PTE): Certifies skills in offensive security and hands-on penetration testing. The exam includes both theory and practical tasks in a lab environment, covering vulnerability scanning, exploitation, and web security.
- CISP – Data Security Governance (CISP-DSG): Addresses data protection and compliance. It includes topics such as data classification, privacy policy, and Chinese regulations like the Personal Information Protection Law (PIPL).
- CISP – Incident Response Engineer (CISP-IRE): Covers cyber incident detection and response. It includes incident handling, digital forensics, and malware analysis. Some exam versions include a practical component in addition to the written test.

=== Certified Information Security Member (CISM) ===
The CISM certification (not to be confused with ISACA's CISM) is an entry-level cybersecurity credential issued under the CNITSEC system. It is designed for personnel engaged in basic information security tasks such as system monitoring, compliance documentation, and routine security operations.
