= European Information Technologies Certification Institute =

European Information Technologies Certification Institute (EITCI)
- Official EITCI logo.
- Abbreviation: EITCI
- Formation: 2008
- Type: Qualifications standardization and certification body
- Legal status: Non-profit organization
- Purpose: Combating digital exclusion
- Location: Avenue des Saisons 100-102, bte 30, 1050 Brussels, Belgium
- Region served: Worldwide
- Main organ: EITCI General Assembly
- Website: eitci.org

The European Information Technologies Certification Institute (EITCI) is an international non-profit organisation headquartered in Brussels, Belgium, aimed primarily towards promotion of digital literacy and prevention of digital exclusion, by providing standards for the certification of knowledge and skills in the area of information and communication technologies, in accordance to the European Commission's guidelines. EITCI is not an official EU organization.

== Knowledge and skills certification standards ==
EITCI provides constant development, governance, and certification of the following professional ICT knowledge and skills certification standards:

- European Information Technologies Certification (EITC) programme - provides certification of individuals' knowledge and skills in narrow, specialized single-subject areas of ICT such as Office software, Computer-aided project management, Online collaboration systems, Raster graphics processing.
- European Information Technologies Certification Academy (EITCA) programme - provides certification of individuals' knowledge and skills in broader field-oriented areas of ICT expertise such as Computer graphics, Information security etc. The EITCA programmes, referred to as EITCA Academies, include selected sets of several to over a dozen of individual EITC programmes, that together comprise a particular area of qualifications.

== See also ==
- EITCA programme
- EITC programme
