= CompTIA =

IT Certification and Training company

Computing Technology Industry Association
- Trade name: CompTIA
- Type: For-profit private company
- Industry: Information technology Cybersecurity
- Founded: January 1, 1982; 44 years ago
- Headquarters: 3500 Lacey Road; Suite 100; Downers Grove, IL 60515, U.S.
- Area served: Global
- Products: Professional certifications
- Owners: H.I.G. Capital; Thoma Bravo
- Divisions: TechAmerica
- Website: Official website

The Computing Technology Industry Association, more commonly known as CompTIA, is an American for-profit trade association that issues vendor-neutral professional certifications for the information technology (IT) industry.

== History ==
CompTIA was created in 1982 as the Association of Better Computer Dealers (ABCD). ABCD later changed its name to the Computing Technology Industry Association in 1990.

In 2010, CompTIA moved its headquarters into a new office space in a facility in Downers Grove, Illinois. By 2014, over one million people worldwide had earned A+ certification. CompTIA established a 501(c)(3) nonprofit organization called Creating IT Futures.

The CompTIA portal moved to a hybrid version of the open-access model in April 2014 with exclusive content for dues-paying members. The move expanded the organization's reach to engage a broader, more diverse set of members, and within a year, CompTIA's membership grew from 2,050 members to more than 50,000 in 2015.

Skillsboost, CompTIA's online resource for schools, was launched in June 2015. It contained resources for students, parents and teachers to promote the importance of computer skills. CompTIA Vendor Summit is an annual conference exclusively for people attending ChannelCon that attempts to address issues within the IT industry. CompTIA held its first annual ChannelCon Vendor Summit in 2015.

By the close of 2016, the organization claimed to have more than 100,000 members worldwide. In January 2017, CompTIA launched an IT professional association built on its acquisition of the Association of Information Technology Professionals.

The organization releases industry studies to track industry trends and changes. Over 2.2 million people have earned CompTIA certifications since the association was established and certifications are issued in over 120 countries. CompTIA administers its exams through Pearson VUE testing centers.

== Certifications ==
All certifications issued by CompTIA expire 3 years after obtainment, reissuance requires repurchase and retesting. However, certifications issued prior to January 1, 2011, do not expire. Almost all certifications have accreditation from the American National Standards Institute (ANSI) on dates valid from 2008 till 2028 available on the ANSI website.

=== Certifications ===
- Tech+: covers IT concepts of the industry. It is similar to A+ Core 1 but includes light programming and databases. Those with this certification may include Associates in IT Sales or Computer Technicians. Tech+ is a great certification for those on a budget, switching careers and want to show that they can operate and troubleshoot computers and phones. Additionally, Tech+ replaced ITF+ (IT Fundamentals). Both do not expire and are valid for life.
- A+: recognized as the long-time industry standard for entry-level IT roles. Those with this certification may include IT Sales, Computer Technicians, Network Technicians and Help Desk. The A+ requires 2 Exams. Core 1 covers troubleshooting and maintaining computers, phones, printers, and networking. Core 2 focuses on operating systems, end of life, deployment and very few hardware questions. When compared to Tech+, A+ Core 1 is more heavy on Networking and also includes Performance Based Questions at the beginning of the Exam. These Questions are designed to simulate real world scenarios, however they can be vague. Tech+ does not include PBQs and is less broad on Networking. Additionally, unlike Tech+, which is Good For Life, the A+ must be renewed every 3 years. For more information, see the section on Certification Expiration below.
- Network+: Used to measure skill as a Network Technician.
- Security+: security certification that builds off of the network security knowledge covered by the Network+ certification, which though recommended, is not required beforehand.
- Cloud+: both cloud computing and virtualization. Maps to DOD 8570 Standards.
- Cloud Essentials: a pathway to the Cloud+ credential.
- CySA+: Cybersecurity Analyst; The certification focuses on cyber-threat detection tools and analysis to identify vulnerabilities and risks. In January 2018, the certification was renamed from CSA+ to CySA+ as a result of a trademark dispute.
- Data+: focuses on data mining, manipulating data, visualizing & reporting data, statistical methods, and governance.
- DataSys+
- Linux+: A single exam known as XK0-004 that is renewable through the CE program, the certification covers Linux operating systems, from their installation and use to the basics of applicable free software and open source licenses. Was formerly a two-part exam LX0-103 and LX0-104 in partnership with Linux Professional Institute.
- PenTest+: intermediate-level certification focusing on penetration testing. covers risk analysis, threat detection, and penetration testing and ethical hacking tools and methodologies. Currently aligns with the DOD 8570 standard.
- Server+: focuses on server-specific hardware and operating systems, IT environments, disaster recovery and business continuity. Server+ had updates released in 2005, 2009, 2018, and 2021.

=== Master level certifications ===
- CompTIA Advanced Security Practitioner (CASP+) is the highest level certification in CompTIA's cybersecurity pathway after Security+, CySA+, and PenTest+. The CASP+ certification was accredited by the International Organization for Standardization (ISO) and the American National Standards Institute (ANSI) on December 13, 2011. The CASP+ exam will certify that the successful candidate has the technical knowledge and skills required to conceptualize, design, and engineer secure solutions across complex enterprise environments. In March 2013, the U.S. Department of Defense approved the certification as a baseline certification accepted for Information Assurance Technical Level III, IS Manager Level II and IA Systems Architect and Engineer Levels I and II. The name of CASP+ is being changed to SecurityX upon the release of exam version CAS-005 in December 2024. (Note: For A+ up through CASP+ one can renew or extend their certification by satisfying in these cases 20 to 75 CEUs a.k.a. "Continuing Education Units," over the three-year period.)
- CloudNetX
- DataAI

=== Specialty certifications ===
- Project+: In 2001, CompTIA acquired the Project+ project management certification program from Gartner. The program, previously called "IT Project+", was updated in 2003.

=== Expansion certifications ===
- SecAI+
- AutoOps+

=== Retired certificates ===
- Certified Document Imaging Architect (CDIA+), is a certification for competency in document imaging, document management, and enterprise content management. Retired on December 1, 2017.
- Healthcare IT Technician certification focused on IT in the healthcare industry and was aimed at IT professionals who install and maintain electronic health record systems. Retired on February 28, 2017.
- Certified Technical Trainer (CTT+) certification is a vendor-neutral certification that is applicable to training professionals in all industries. Originally administered in 2001 through The Chauncey Institute, the CTT program was acquired by CompTIA and renamed as CTT+. It was created through a collaboration of the Information Technology Training Association, Inc. (ITTA) and the Computer Education Management Association (CedMA). Retired on October 31, 2023, although anyone who had earned the CTT+ certification will remain certified after the retirement date.

=== Stackable certifications ===
In January 2018, CompTIA released stackable certifications:

==== CompTIA infrastructure career pathway ====
- Specialist
  - CompTIA IT Operations Specialist (A+/Network+)
  - CompTIA Systems Support Specialist (A+/Linux+)
- Professional
  - CompTIA Cloud Admin Professional (Network+/Cloud+)
  - CompTIA Network Infrastructure Professional (Network+/Server+)
  - CompTIA Linux Network Professional (Network+/Linux+)

==== CompTIA cybersecurity career pathway ====
- Specialist
  - CompTIA Secure Infrastructure Specialist (A+/Network+/Security+)
- Professional
  - CompTIA Secure Cloud Professional (Security+/Cloud+)
  - CompTIA Security Analytics Professional (Security+/CySA+)
  - CompTIA Network Vulnerability Assessment Professional (Security+/PenTest+)
  - CompTIA Network Security Professional (Security+/PenTest+/CySA+)
- Expert
  - CompTIA Security Analytics Expert (Security+/CySA+/CASP+)
  - CompTIA Security Infrastructure Expert (Security+/CySA+/PenTest+/CASP+)

=== Trustmarks ===
CompTIA offers trustmarks to businesses to certify their security capabilities and credentials.

The CompTIA Security Trustmark+ is based on the NIST Cybersecurity Framework and demonstrates compliance with key industry regulations such as PCI-DSS, SSAE-16, HIPAA, and others reliant on the NIST Framework. It is based on a third-party assessment of security policies, procedures and operations.

CompTIA offered additional trustmarks, a Managed Services Trustmark and Managed Print Trustmark, that were retired on September 30, 2021.

== Lobbying ==
CompTIA, together with the Entertainment Software Association, issued a statement against a right to repair bill in Nebraska in 2017.

CompTIA permanently stepped back from all lobbying activity related to right to repair legislation as of February 3, 2020.

== Certification expiration ==
Previously, CompTIA marketed its flagship A+, Network+, and Security+ certifications as being valid for a lifetime. In January 2011, CompTIA changed the status of these certifications so that they would expire every three years. Under this proposal, certified individuals would have to re-certify for the exams or pay a yearly maintenance fee for a CEU (Continuing Education Units) system. CompTIA modified the guidelines so that only certificates received after January 1, 2011, would need to be renewed every three years and would require documented continuing education hours. The un-expirable certificates, issued before 2011, are officially called Good-for-Life; updating the Good-for-Life certification with an expirable certification does not replace the Good-for-Life certification.

=== Retired Certifications ===
As of August 9, 2026, the retired certifications listed below are considered Good-for-Life.

Certification	Year Retired
i-Net+	2007
e-Biz+	2008
DHTI+	2009
Convergence+	2010
RFID+	2011
CTP+	2012
IT for Sales	2013
Green IT	2013
PDI+	2014
Mobile App Security+ ADR	2015
Mobile App Security+ iOS	2015
Strata IT Fundamentals	2015
Storage+	2016
Healthcare IT Technician	2017
CDIA+	2017
CTT+	2023
Cloud Essentials+	2025

== See also ==
- Strata Exam
- Computer repair technician
- List of computer security certifications
