= Virus Bulletin =

Computer virus prevention and detection magazine

- Founded: 1989
- Country: United Kingdom
- Language: English
- Website: www.virusbulletin.com

Virus Bulletin is a magazine about the prevention, detection and removal of malware and spam. It regularly features analyses of the latest virus threats, articles exploring new developments in the fight against viruses, interviews with anti-virus experts, and evaluations of current anti-malware products.

== History and profile ==
Virus Bulletin was founded in 1989` as a monthly hardcopy magazine, and later distributed electronically in PDF format. The monthly publication format was discontinued in July 2014 and articles are now made available as standalone pieces on the website. The magazine was originally located in the Sophos headquarters in Abingdon, Oxfordshire in the UK. It was co-founded and is owned by Jan Hruska and Peter Lammer, the co-founders of Sophos. Virus Bulletin claims to have full editorial independence and not favour Sophos products in its tests and reviews.

Technical experts from anti-virus vendors have written articles for the magazine, which also conducts comparison tests of the detection rates of anti-virus software. Products which manage to detect 100% of the viruses in the wild, without false alarms, are given the VB100 award.

The magazine holds an annual conference (in late September or early October) for computer security professionals. In recent years both magazine and conference have branched out to discuss anti-spam and other security issues as well as malware. Notable previous speakers include Mikko Hyppönen, Eugene Kaspersky and Graham Cluley, as well as representatives from all major anti-virus vendors.

Virus Bulletin was a founder member of the Anti-Malware Testing Standards Organization and remains a member today.
