= DPM =

DPM may refer to:

== Science and technology ==
- Damp-proof membrane, a membrane material applied to prevent moisture transmission
- Defects per million opportunities in manufacturing
- Diesel particulate matter, an occupational hazard due to diesel exhaust
- Di(propylene glycol) methyl ether, a specialty solvent
- Dipivaloylmethane, chemical compound similar to acetylacetone
- Discrete particle method, any of a family of numerical methods
- Disintegrations per minute, a measure of the activity of the source of radioactivity
- Disappearing Positive Methodology, state-sponsored subversion of drug testing processes in Russian doping programme

=== Computing ===
- Data position measurement
- Digital Postmarks
- System Center Data Protection Manager, by Microsoft

== Business ==
- Direct part marking, permanently marking parts with product information
- Diversified Project Management

== Profession ==
- Deputy Prime Minister
- Diploma in Psychological Medicine
- Doctor of Podiatric Medicine
- Doctor of Project Management
- Doctor of Plant Medicine
- Doctor of Pastoral Music, in Doctor of Musical Arts

== Other uses ==
- DPM. a variant of the Soviet Degtyaryov machine gun
- Detroit People Mover, an automated people mover system
- Democratic Party of Macedonians (Demokratska partija Makedonaca), a political party in Serbia
- Disappearing Positive Methodology, in the McLaren Report
- Disruptive Pattern Material, a camouflage pattern used by the British Armed Forces (formerly) and others
- German Tank Museum, (German: Deutsches Panzermuseum Münster)
- Daniel Patrick Moynihan, American politician

== See also ==
- DPMS (disambiguation)
- Deutscher Pfadfinderbund Mosaik (DPBM)
