= Engineering economics =

Subset of economics

Engineering economics, previously known as engineering economy, is a subset of economics concerned with the use and "...application of economic principles" in the analysis of engineering decisions. As a discipline, it is focused on the branch of economics known as microeconomics in that it studies the behavior of individuals and firms in making decisions regarding the allocation of limited resources. Thus, it focuses on the decision making process, its context and environment. It is pragmatic by nature, integrating economic theory with engineering practice. But, it is also a simplified application of microeconomic theory in that it assumes elements such as price determination, competition and demand/supply to be fixed inputs from other sources. As a discipline though, it is closely related to others such as statistics, mathematics and cost accounting. It draws upon the logical framework of economics but adds to that the analytical power of mathematics and statistics.

Engineers seek solutions to problems, and along with the technical aspects, the economic viability of each potential solution is normally considered from a specific viewpoint that reflects its economic utility to a constituency. Fundamentally, engineering economics involves formulating, estimating, and evaluating the economic outcomes when alternatives to accomplish a defined purpose are available.

In some U.S. undergraduate civil engineering curricula, engineering economics is a required course. It is a topic on the Fundamentals of Engineering examination, and questions might also be asked on the Principles and Practice of Engineering examination; both are part of the Professional Engineering registration process.

Considering the time value of money is central to most engineering economic analyses. Cash flows are discounted using an interest rate, except in the most basic economic studies.

For each problem, there are usually many possible alternatives. One option that must be considered in each analysis, and is often the choice, is the do nothing alternative. The opportunity cost of making one choice over another must also be considered. There are also non-economic factors to be considered, like color, style, public image, etc.; such factors are termed attributes.

Costs as well as revenues are considered, for each alternative, for an analysis period that is either a fixed number of years or the estimated life of the project. The salvage value is often forgotten, but is important, and is either the net cost or revenue for decommissioning the project.

Some other topics that may be addressed in engineering economics are inflation, uncertainty, replacements, depreciation, resource depletion, taxes, tax credits, accounting, cost estimations, or capital financing. All these topics are primary skills and knowledge areas in the field of cost engineering.

Since engineering is an important part of the manufacturing sector of the economy, engineering industrial economics is an important part of industrial or business economics. Major topics in engineering industrial economics are:

- The economics of the management, operation, and growth and profitability of engineering firms;
- Macro-level engineering economic trends and issues;
- Engineering product markets and demand influences; and
- The development, marketing, and financing of new engineering technologies and products.
- Benefit–cost ratio

== Examples of usage ==
Some examples of engineering economic problems range from value analysis to economic studies. Each of these is relevant in different situations, and most often used by engineers or project managers. For example, engineering economic analysis helps a company not only determine the difference between fixed and incremental costs of certain operations, but also calculates that cost, depending upon a number of variables. Further uses of engineering economics include:

- Value analysis
- Linear programming
- Critical path economy
- Interest and money - time relationships
- Depreciation and valuation
- Capital budgeting
- Risk, uncertainty, and sensitivity analysis
- Fixed, incremental, and sunk costs
- Replacement studies
- Minimum cost formulas
- Various economic studies in relation to both public and private ventures

Each of the previous components of engineering economics is critical at certain junctures, depending on the situation, scale, and objective of the project at hand. Critical path economy, as an example, is necessary in most situations as it is the coordination and planning of material, labor, and capital movements in a specific project. The most critical of these "paths" are determined to be those that have an effect upon the outcome both in time and cost. Therefore, the critical paths must be determined and closely monitored by engineers and managers alike. Engineering economics helps provide the Gantt charts and activity-event networks to ascertain the correct use of time and resources.

=== Value Analysis ===
Proper value analysis finds its roots in the need for industrial engineers and managers to not only simplify and improve processes and systems, but also the logical simplification of the designs of those products and systems. Though not directly related to engineering economy, value analysis is nonetheless important, and allows engineers to properly manage new and existing systems/processes to make them more simple and save money and time. Further, value analysis helps combat common "roadblock excuses" that may trip up managers or engineers. Sayings such as "The customer wants it this way" are retorted by questions such as; has the customer been told of cheaper alternatives or methods? "If the product is changed, machines will be idle for lack of work" can be combated by; can management not find new and profitable uses for these machines? Questions like these are part of engineering economy, as they preface any real studies or analyses.

=== Linear Programming ===
Linear programming is the use of mathematical methods to find optimized solutions, whether they be minimized or maximized in nature. This method uses a series of lines to create a polygon then to determine the largest, or smallest, point on that shape. Manufacturing operations often use linear programming to help mitigate costs and maximize profits or production.

=== Interest and Money – Time Relationships ===
Considering the prevalence of capital to be lent for a certain period of time, with the understanding that it will be returned to the investor, money-time relationships analyze the costs associated with these types of actions. Capital itself must be divided into two different categories, equity capital and debt capital. Equity capital is money already at the disposal of the business, and mainly derived from profit, and therefore is not of much concern, as it has no owners that demand its return with interest. Debt capital does indeed have owners, and they require that its usage be returned with "profit", otherwise known as interest. The interest to be paid by the business is going to be an expense, while the capital lenders will take interest as a profit, which may confuse the situation. To add to this, each will change the income tax position of the participants.

Interest and money time relationships come into play when the capital required to complete a project must be either borrowed or derived from reserves. To borrow brings about the question of interest and value created by the completion of the project. While taking capital from reserves also denies its usage on other projects that may yield more results. Interest in the simplest terms is defined by the multiplication of the principal, the units of time, and the interest rate. The complexity of interest calculations, however, becomes much higher as factors such as compounding interest or annuities come into play.

Engineers often utilize compound interest tables to determine the future or present value of capital. These tables can also be used to determine the effect annuities have on loans, operations, or other situations. All one needs to utilize a compound interest table is three things; the time period of the analysis, the minimum attractive rate of return (MARR), and the capital value itself. The table will yield a multiplication factor to be used with the capital value, this will then give the user the proper future or present value.

=== Examples of Present, Future, and Annuity Analysis ===
Using the compound interest tables mentioned above, an engineer or manager can quickly determine the value of capital over a certain time period. For example, a company wishes to borrow $5,000.00 to finance a new machine, and will need to repay that loan in 5 years at 7%. Using the table, 5 years and 7% gives the factor of 1.403, which will be multiplied by $5,000.00. This will result in $7,015.00. This is of course under the assumption that the company will make a lump payment at the conclusion of the five years, not making any payments prior.

A much more applicable example is one with a certain piece of equipment that will yield benefit for a manufacturing operation over a certain period of time. For instance, the machine benefits the company $2,500.00 every year, and has a useful life of 8 years. The MARR is determined to be roughly 5%. The compound interest tables yield a different factor for different types of analysis in this scenario. If the company wishes to know the Net Present Benefit (NPB) of these benefits; then the factor is the P/A of 8 yrs at 5%. This is 6.463. If the company wishes to know the future worth of these benefits; then the factors is the F/A of 8 yrs at 5%; which is 9.549. The former gives a NPB of $16,157.50, while the latter gives a future value of $23,872.50.

These scenarios are extremely simple in nature, and do not reflect the reality of most industrial situations. Thus, an engineer must begin to factor in costs and benefits, then find the worth of the proposed machine, expansion, or facility.

=== Depreciation and Valuation ===
The fact that assets and material in the real world eventually wear down, and thence break, is a situation that must be accounted for. Depreciation itself is defined by the decreasing of value of any given asset, though some exceptions do exist. Historical cost and estimated useful life can be considered the basis for depreciation in a basic sense, as any decrease in value would be based on an original value. The idea and existence of depreciation becomes especially relevant to engineering and project management is the fact that capital equipment and assets used in operations will slowly decrease in worth, which will also coincide with an increase in the likelihood of machine failure. Hence the recording and calculation of depreciation is important for two major reasons.

1. To give an estimate of "recovery capital" that has been put back into the property.
2. To enable depreciation to be charged against profits that, like other costs, can be used for income taxation purposes.

Both of these reasons, however, cannot make up for the "fleeting" nature of depreciation, which make direct analysis somewhat difficult. To further add to the issues associated with depreciation, it must be broken down into three separate types, each having intricate calculations and implications.

- Normal depreciation, due to physical or functional losses.
- Price depreciation, due to changes in market value.
- Depletion, due to the use of all available resources.

Calculation of depreciation also comes in a number of forms; straight line, declining balance, sum-of-the-year's, and service output. The first method being perhaps the easiest to calculate, while the remaining have varying levels of difficulty and utility. Most situations faced by managers in regards to depreciation can be solved using any of these formulas, however, company policy or preference of individual may affect the choice of model.

The main form of depreciation used inside the U.S. is the Modified Accelerated Capital Recovery System (MACRS), and it is based on a number of tables that give the class of asset, and its life. Certain classes are given certain lifespans, and these affect the value of an asset that can be depreciated each year. This does not necessarily mean that an asset must be discarded after its MACRS life is fulfilled, just that it can no longer be used for tax deductions.

=== Capital Budgeting ===
Capital budgeting, in relation to engineering economics, is the proper usage and utilization of capital to achieve project objectives. It can be fully defined by the statement; "... as the series of decisions by individuals and firms concerning how much and where resources will be obtained and expended to meet future objectives." This definition almost perfectly explains capital and its general relation to engineering, though some special cases may not lend themselves to such a concise explanation. (In some cases, decision trees and real options analysis may be applied.) The actual acquisition of that capital has many different routes, from equity to bonds to retained profits, each having unique strengths and weakness, especially when in relation to income taxation. Factors such as risk of capital loss, along with possible or expected returns must also be considered when capital budgeting is underway. For example, if a company has $20,000 to invest in a number of high, moderate, and low risk projects, the decision would depend upon how much risk the company is willing to take on, and if the returns offered by each category offset this perceived risk. Continuing with this example, if the high risk offered only 20% return, while the moderate offered 19% return, engineers and managers would most likely choose the moderate risk project, as its return is far more favorable for its category. The high risk project failed to offer proper returns to warrant its risk status. A more difficult decision may be between a moderate risk offering 15% while a low risk offering 11% return. The decision here would be much more subject to factors such as company policy, extra available capital, and possible investors.

"In general, the firm should estimate the project opportunities, including investment requirements and prospective rates of return for each, expected to be available for the coming period. Then the available capital should be tentatively allocated to the most favorable projects. The lowest prospective rate of return within the capital available then becomes the minimum acceptable rate of return for analyses of any projects during that period."

=== Minimum Cost Formulas ===
Being one of the most important and integral operations in the engineering economic field is the minimization of cost in systems and processes. Time, resources, labor, and capital must all be minimized when placed into any system, so that revenue, product, and profit can be maximized. Hence, the general equation;

$C=ax +b/x+k$

where C is total cost, a b and k are constants, and x is the variable number of units produced.

There are a great number of cost analysis formulas, each for particular situations and are warranted by the policies of the company in question, or the preferences of the engineer at hand.

=== Economic Studies, both Private and Public in Nature ===
Economic studies, which are much more common outside of engineering economics, are still used from time to time to determine feasibility and utility of certain projects. They do not, however, truly reflect the "common notion" of economic studies, which is fixated upon macroeconomics, something engineers have little interaction with. Therefore, the studies conducted in engineering economics are for specific companies and limited projects inside those companies. At most one may expect to find some feasibility studies done by private firms for the government or another business, but these again are in stark contrast to the overarching nature of true economic studies. Studies have a number of major steps that can be applied to almost every type of situation, those being as follows;

- Planning and screening - Mainly reviewing objectives and issues that may be encountered.
- Reference to standard economic studies - Consultation of standard forms.
- Estimating - Speculating as to the magnitude of costs and other variables.
- Reliability - The ability to properly estimate.
- Comparison between actual and projected performance - Verify savings, review failures, to ensure that proposals were valid, and to add to future studies.
- Objectivity of the analyst - To ensure the individual that advanced proposals or conducted analysis was not biased toward certain outcomes.
