= Section 179 depreciation deduction =

American tax code provision

Section 179 of the United States Internal Revenue Code (26 U.S.C. § 179), allows a taxpayer to elect to deduct the cost of certain types of property on their income taxes as an expense, rather than requiring the cost of the property to be capitalized and depreciated. This property is generally limited to tangible, depreciable, personal property which is acquired by purchase for use in the active conduct of a trade or business. Buildings were not eligible for section 179 deductions prior to the passage of the Small Business Jobs Act of 2010; however, qualified real property may be deducted now.

Depreciable property that is not eligible for a section 179 deduction is still deductible over a number of years through MACRS depreciation according to sections 167 and 168. The 179 election is optional, and the eligible property may be depreciated according to sections 167 and 168 if preferable for tax reasons. Further, the 179 election may be made only for the year the equipment is placed in use and is waived if not taken for that year. However, if the election is made, it is irrevocable unless special permission is given.

For regular depreciation deductions in the United States, see MACRS.

== Limitations ==
The section 179 election is subject to three important limitations.

- First, there is a dollar limitation. Under section 179(b)(1), the maximum deduction a taxpayer may take in a year is $1,040,000 for tax year 2020.
- Second, if a taxpayer places more than $2,000,000 worth of section 179 property into service during a single taxable year, the § 179 deduction is reduced, dollar for dollar, by the amount exceeding the $2,500,000 threshold, again as of January 1, 2018.
- Finally, section 179(b)(3) provides that a taxpayer's § 179 deduction for any taxable year may not exceed the taxpayer's aggregate income from the active conduct of trade or business by the taxpayer for that year. If, for example, the taxpayer's net trade or business income from active conduct of trade or business was $72,500 in 2006, then the taxpayer's § 179 deduction cannot exceed $72,500 for 2006. However, the § 179 deduction not allowed for any year because of this limitation can be carried over to the next year.

== Large vehicles ==
Up to $25,500 of the cost of vehicles rated at more than 6,000 pounds gross vehicle weight and not more than 14,000 pounds gross vehicle weight (like RV) can be deducted using a section 179 deduction. The limitation on sport utility vehicles does not impact larger commercial vehicles, commuter vans, or buses.

== See also ==
- MACRS regarding U.S. tax depreciation rules
- Depreciation recapture
- Limits on Depreciation Deduction
- Simon v. Commissioner
