= MACR =

MACR or MACRS may refer to

- Master Aircrew (MAcr), a rank of the Royal Air force
- Minimum Age of Criminal Responsibility, MACR
- Modified Accelerated Cost Recovery System (MACRS) of the U.S. tax code
