= Cost segregation study =

U.S. tax optimization technique

Under United States tax laws and accounting rules, cost segregation is the process of identifying personal property assets that are grouped with real property assets, and separating out personal assets for tax reporting purposes. According to the American Society of Cost Segregation Professionals, a cost segregation is "the process of identifying property components that are considered "personal property" or "land improvements" under the federal tax code."

A cost segregation study identifies and reclassifies personal property assets to shorten the depreciation time for taxation purposes, which reduces current income tax obligations. Personal property assets include a building's non-structural elements, exterior land improvements and indirect construction costs.The primary goal of a cost segregation study is to identify all construction-related costs that can be depreciated over a shorter tax life (typically 5, 7 and 15 years) than the building (39 years for non-residential real property). Personal property assets found in a cost segregation study generally include items that are affixed to the building but do not relate to the overall operation and maintenance of the building.

Land Improvements generally include items located outside a building that are affixed to the land and do not relate to the overall operation and maintenance of a building. Reducing tax lives results in accelerated depreciation deductions, a reduced tax liability, and increased cash flow. Land improvements include parking lots, driveways, paved areas, site utilities, walk ways, sidewalks, curbing, concrete stairs, fencing, retaining walls, block walls, car ports, dumpster enclosures, and landscaping. Landscaping itself can be separated into plants, trees, shrubs, sod, mulch, rock, and security lighting.

A Cost Segregation study allows a taxpayer who owns real estate to reclassify certain assets as Section 1245 property with shorter useful lives for depreciation purposes, rather than the useful life for Section 1250 property.

Recent tax law changes under the Tax Cuts and Jobs Act of 2017 (TCJA) have given a boost to cost segregation. Bonus depreciation was increased from 50% to 100% on certain qualifying assets. Real estate investors will receive immediate expensing of certain 5, 7 and 15 year property. TCJA also allows used property that was acquired after Sept. 27, 2017 to qualify for this special depreciation treatment. A quality cost segregation will separate any costs that qualify under the new bonus depreciation rules.

== Property asset classification ==
Analysis of capital expenditures is used to determine appropriate asset classifications. Cost segregation identifies building costs that would typically be depreciated over a 27.5 or 39-year period and reclassifies them to permit a shorter, accelerated method of depreciation for certain building costs. Costs for non-structural elements, such as wall covering, carpet, accent lighting, portions of the electrical system, and exterior site improvements such as sidewalks and landscaping, can often be depreciated over five, seven or 15 years, rather than over 27.5 or 39 years.

== Eligibility ==
Real property eligible for cost segregation includes buildings that have been purchased, constructed, expanded or remodeled since 1987. A formal engineering based study is typically cost-effective for buildings purchased or remodeled at a cost greater than $750,000. A cost segregation study is most efficient for new buildings recently constructed, but it can also uncover retroactive tax deductions for older buildings which can generate significant short benefits due to "catch-up" depreciation.

== Cost segregation study process ==
"A cost-segregation specialist can perform a nonintrusive yet detailed engineering study of a building's walls, flooring, and ceilings; and its plumbing, electrical, lighting, telecommunications, heating and cooling systems" (Money Doesn't Grow on Trees, But It Could be Hidden in the Walls By William J. Barnes, CPA).

Usually, a construction engineer will analyze architectural drawings, mechanical and electrical plans, and other blueprints to segregate the structural and general building electrical and mechanical components from those linked to personal property. The study also allocates “soft costs,” such as architect and engineering fees, to all components of the building.

"In general, a study by a construction engineer is more reliable than one conducted by someone with no engineering or construction background. However, the possession of specific construction knowledge is not the only criterion. Experience in cost estimating and allocation, as well as knowledge of the applicable law, are other important criteria. A quality study identifies the preparer and always references his/her credentials, experience and expertise in the cost segregation area" (www.irs.gov - Cost Segregation Audit Technique Guide - Chapter 4 - Principal Elements of a Quality Cost Segregation Study and Report).

== Tax benefits of cost segregation ==
In addition to providing lower taxes, cost segregation can benefit businesses in a number of ways:

1. Maximizing tax savings by adjusting the timing of deductions. When an asset's life is shortened, depreciation expense is accelerated and tax payments are decreased during the early stages of a property's life. This, in turn, releases cash for investment opportunities or current operating needs.
2. Creating an audit trail. Improper documentation of cost and asset classifications can lead to an unfavorable audit adjustment. A properly documented cost segregation helps resolve IRS inquiries at the earliest stages.
3. Playing Catch-Up: Retroactivity. Since 1996, taxpayers can capture immediate retroactive savings on property added since 1987. Previous rules, which provided a four-year catch-up period for retroactive savings, have been amended to allow taxpayers to take the entire amount of the adjustment in the year the cost segregation is completed. This opportunity to recapture unrecognized depreciation in one year presents an opportunity to perform retroactive cost segregation analyses on older properties to increase cash flow in the current year.
4. Additional tax benefits. Cost segregation can also reveal opportunities to reduce real estate tax liabilities and identify certain sales and use tax savings opportunities.

== Downsides to Cost Segregation Studies ==
Downsides to cost segregation studies include cost, the triggering of depreciation recapture and understatement penalties for taxpayers that use cost segregation too aggressively.

== See also ==
- Depreciation
- MACRS
