= Selection in planning =

Selection in Planning (SIP) is a method of selection used to identify suitable vendors and contractors and is an alternative to selection through tendering or request for proposal.

== History ==
SIP has gained momentum in those environments where a customer's requirements are subject to ongoing changes or where the development of a project or procurement exercise is expected to be implemented gradually. In such circumstances customers may choose to employ the SIP process rather than issuing a formal tender.

== Process ==
The advantages of SIP are that changes to a customer's requirements or specifications do not require that this information be re-issued as would normally be the case with a tender (with the exception of minor modifications). Instead a customer, during the planning process of a project or procurement requirement, solicits ongoing information and feedback from prospective vendors and contractors making an assessment of their capability, skills, financial competitiveness and overall suitability during the communications process.

The SIP process is sometimes considered by critics to be a less formal procedure in which the qualification of vendors and contractors is not addressed with the same scrutiny as would be the case in a tender. However the SIP process, just as with tendering, is at the discretion of the selector. Those customers bound by statutory procurement procedures or corporate policies governing the same, apply these requirements to the SIP process by means of ongoing dialogue and solicitation of information from vendors and contractors.

For these reasons and among specific industries, such as construction, as well as in certain economic environments it has resulted in the rapid growth of this process.

== See also ==
- Procurement
- Construction bidding
- Diversified Project Management
