= Simon v. Commissioner =

American legal case

- Court: United States Court of Appeals for the Second Circuit
- Full case name: Richard L. Simon and Fiona Simon v. Commissioner of Internal Revenue
- Argued: June 13, 1995
- Decided: October 13, 1995
- Citations: 68 F.3d 41; 76 A.F.T.R.2d 95-6911; 64 USLW 2269; 95-2 USTC (CCH) ¶ 50,552

Case history
- Prior history: 103 T.C. 247 (1994)

Court membership
- Judges sitting: James Lowell Oakes, Ralph K. Winter Jr., John Daniel Mahoney

Case opinions
- Majority: Winter, joined by Mahoney
- Dissent: Oakes

Laws applied
- Internal Revenue Code

Simon v. Commissioner, 68 F.3d 41 (2d. Cir. 1995), was a decision by the Second Circuit of the United States Court of Appeals relating to the deductibility of expensive items or tools that may increase in value as a collectible but decrease in value if used in the course of a business or trade.

== Background ==
The plaintiffs in this case are Richard and Fiona Simon. The Simons are two full-time professional violinists who perform with the New York Philharmonic Orchestra. In 1985, the Simons purchased two bows made by François Tourte in the 19th Century, one for $30,000 and the second for $21,500, both barely used at the time of purchase.

In 1989, the Simons claimed a $6,300 and $4,515 depreciation deduction on the first and second bow respectively in their tax report. The basis for this deduction was the under §167 of the US Tax Code as calculated based on §168 of the US Tax Code. The Tax Commissioner objected to this deduction, as the fair market value of the bows had increased. When the first bow was appraised for tax purposes in 1985 it had a value of $35,000, but in 1990 it had risen to $45,000. The value of the second bow increased as well from $25,000 to $35,000. Because of these increases in value, the Commissioner claimed that useful life could not be determined and therefore the deduction could not be taken.

== Issue ==
Whether petitioners are entitled to deduct depreciation claimed under the accelerated cost recovery system for the year in issue.

== Decision ==
The Tax Court determined that the Simons' deduction for the depreciated value of the violins was proper for the 1989 tax year under § 168 of the Tax Code.

The majority of the court agreed that the deduction should be allowed, pointing out that "taxpayers have long been allowed asset depreciation deductions in order to allow them to allocate their expense of using an income-producing asset to the periods that are benefited by that asset". This is so that depreciation taken in a given year represents that year's reduction of the asset through use.

Prior to the passage of the Economic Recovery Tax Act of 1981 (ERTA), the depreciation of personal property was solely determined by § 167 of the Internal Revenue Code of 1954. Calculating depreciation under this part of the code required the taxpayer to determine the "useful life" of property which was difficult and often led to disagreements. After ERTA, Congress simplified the process by reducing the number of years over which a taxpayer could depreciate property to four periods (3, 5, 10, and 15 years) and basing the depreciation on these statutory year periods rather than useful life.

Under § 168(a), a taxpayer may deduct depreciations of "recovery property" which is property that is (1) tangible, (2) placed in service after 1980, (3) of a character subject to the allowance for depreciation, and (4) used in the trade or business, or held for the production of income. The court defined subsection (3) to mean that the "property must suffer exhaustion, wear and tear, or obsolescence in order to be depreciated". Because of the frequent wear and tear of the bows, the court found that the bows fit in the parameters of depreciable personal property under § 168.

Even though the fair market value of bows increased, the court stated that for it to look into determining whether an asset has a "separate, non business" value for depreciation purposes would be contrary to Congress's intent to simplify this concept.

=== Dissent ===
The dissent asserted that the majority decision gives an improper "tax shelter" for musicians. They state that the Internal Revenue Code, in accordance with congressional intent, meant for these "works of art" to be non-depreciable property since instruments and other collectibles have an indeterminable useful life.

== Significance ==
The court found that § 168 of the Tax Code does not prevent a taxpayer from depreciating a business asset solely due to its age, or because the asset may have appreciated in value over time. The potential consequence of this simplification is that § 168 may "allow an asset to be written off over a period much shorter than its actual useful life and that the entire cost might be deducted despite the fact that there might be no actual economic decrease in value".
