= Capital Cost Allowance =

Tax rule for Canadian businesses

Capital Cost Allowance (CCA) is the means by which Canadian businesses may claim depreciation expense for calculating taxable income under the Income Tax Act. Similar allowances are in effect for calculating taxable income for provincial purposes.

== General rules for CCA calculation ==
=== Capital property ===
Capital property eligible for CCA excludes:

- land
- property the cost of which is deductible in computing the taxpayer's income
- property that is described in the taxpayer's inventory
- property that was not acquired for the purpose of gaining or producing income
- property that was acquired by an expenditure in respect of which the taxpayer is allowed a deduction under section 37
- specified artwork and crafts acquired after November 12, 1981
- property that is a camp, yacht, lodge or golf course or facility acquired after December 31, 1974 if any outlay or expense for the use or maintenance of that property is not deductible by virtue of paragraph 18(1)(l)

CCA is calculated on undepreciated capital cost ("UCC"), which is generally defined as:

- the capital cost of property that is acquired or made available for use (whichever is the later date)
- plus legal, accounting, engineering or other fees incurred to acquire the property
- plus, in the case of a property a taxpayer manufactures for his own use, it includes material, labour and overhead costs reasonably attributable to the property, but nothing for any profit which might have been earned had the asset been sold
- less the proceeds of disposition for a sold asset (but no greater than its original capital cost)
- less any assistance (including tax credits) the taxpayer has received with respect to the acquisition of the property
- less any CCA previously claimed with respect to the class

Where the UCC for a class is negative, a recapture of depreciation is deemed to take place, thus adding to taxable income and bringing the balance of UCC back to zero. Where UCC for a class is positive, but all assets with respect to that class have been disposed of, a terminal loss is deemed to take place, thus deducting from taxable income and bringing the balance of UCC back to zero.

=== CCA calculation ===
CCA itself is generally calculated using the following items:

CCA = capital cost allowance for the current fiscal period
UCC = undepreciated capital cost before claiming CCA in the current fiscal period
t = the proportion of days in the current fiscal period vs a normal fiscal period, if the current fiscal period is a stub, otherwise 1
d = the specified CCA rate with respect to the class
a = acquisition cost of the property in the current fiscal period
b = proceeds of disposition with respect to the property in the current fiscal period (but not greater than its original cost)
c = assistance received with respect to the property in the current fiscal period (net of any repayments made)

For assets subject to the full-year rule:

$CCA = tdUCC$

For assets subject to the half-year rule:

$CCA = tdUCC - \frac{1}{2}td\left ( a - b - c \right )$

=== Types of allowance ===
Under the Income Tax Act:

- paragraph 18(1)(b) prohibits the deduction of any outlay, loss or replacement of capital, payment on account of capital or any allowance for depreciation, obsolescence or depletion, unless specifically allowed in Part I of the Act.
- paragraph 20(1)(a) allows a deduction, in computing the income from a business or property, of any amount allowed by regulation in respect of the capital cost of a property.

Part XI of the Income Tax Regulations provides for the calculation rules for CCA, and Schedule II outlines the various classes of capital property that are eligible for it. Special rules are in place to deem certain assets to be in separate classes, thus not becoming part of the general pool for the class. Certain elections are available to taxpayers to transfer or reclassify assets from one class to another.

Additional allowances are prescribed with respect to specified circumstances. Specialized calculations for certain classes are also outlined in:

- Schedule III for property in Class 13 (leasehold interests)
- Schedule IV for property in Class 15 (property for cutting and removing timber from a timber limit)
- Schedule V for property relating to industrial mineral mines
- Schedule VI for property relating to timber limits and cutting rights

Part XVII of the Income Tax Regulations provides for specialized calculation rules for CCA with respect to capital property acquired for use in earning income from farming and fishing.

=== Typical classes of assets for CCA purposes ===
CCA is calculated under the half-year rule, except where otherwise specified, with respect to the following classes.

Class	Rate	Description
1	4%	Buildings acquired after 1987
3	5%	Building acquired before 1988
7	15%	Canoes and boats (including their fittings, furniture and equipment)
8	20%	Assets not included in other classes (common examples include furniture, equipment not used for manufacturing and processing, and tools costing more than $500)
9	25%	Aircraft
10	30%	Automobiles (including passenger vehicles costing less than $30,000, trucks, vans, etc. - but not taxis), computer equipment and systems software for that equipment
10.1	30%	Passenger vehicles costing more than $30,000 (including taxes). Each vehicle must be kept in a separate class, and no terminal loss may be claimed.
12	100% (full-year rule)	medical or dental instruments and kitchen utensils, costing less than $500; tools costing less than $500; computer software (except systems software, which is in class 10); video-cassettes, video-laser discs, and digital video disks for short-term rental
12	100% (half-year rule)	a die, jig, pattern, mould or last; the cutting or shaping part in a machine; a motion picture film or video tape that is a television commercial message; a certified feature film or certified production
13	Original lease period plus one renewal period (Minimum 5 years and Maximum 40 years)	Improvements made to leased premises
14	Length of life of property (full-year rule)	Franchises, Concessions, Patents, and Licences
17	8%	Parking lots
29	50% straight-line (effectively allocated 25%-50%-25% over three years)	Eligible machinery and equipment used in Canada to manufacture and process goods for sale or lease, acquired after March 18, 2007, and before 2016 that would otherwise be included in Class 43.
43	30%	Manufacturing and processing equipment not included in class 29 - may be kept in separate classes by filing an election
44		Patents acquired after April 26, 1993
45	45%	Computer equipment and systems software acquired after March 22, 2004 and before March 19, 2007
46	30%	Data network equipment acquired after March 22, 2004
50	55%	Computer equipment and systems software acquired after March 18, 2007
52	100% (full-year rule)	Computer equipment and systems software acquired after January 27, 2009 and before February 2011. Only applies to new equipment used in Canada.

In contrast to the practice followed in the United States for depreciation there is no penalty for failing to claim Capital Cost Allowance. Where a taxpayer claims less than the amount of CCA to which he is entitled the pool remains intact, and available for claims in future years. Unclaimed amounts are not subject to recapture.

== Capital investment appraisal under CCA rules ==
Because assets subject to CCA are generally pooled by class, and CCA is generally calculated on a declining-balance basis, specific techniques have been developed to determine the net present after-tax value of such capital investments. For standard scenarios under the full-year rule and half-year rule models, the following standard items are employed:

I = Investment
d = CCA rate per year for tax purposes
t = rate of taxation
n = number of years
i = cost of capital, rate of interest, or minimum rate of return (whichever is most relevant)

More specialized analysis would need to be applied to:

- assets with specific lives (i.e. Classes 13 and 14)
- assets with non-standard rate calculations (i.e. Class 29)
- assets that are deemed to constitute a separate class of property, thus not becoming part of a capital cost pool
- scenarios where disposal values at a future date are part of the appraisal calculation, leading to a deduction from the capital cost pool, a recapture of depreciation, or the calculation of a taxable capital gain

=== Full-year rule ===
Capital cost allowance will be calculated as follows:

Year	Calculated CCA
1	$Id$
2	$Id(1-d)$
3	$Id(1-d)^2$
n	$Id(1-d)^{n-1}$

Therefore, the Tax shield in year n = $Itd(1-d)^{n-1}$, and the present value of the taxation credits will be equal to $Itd \sum_{n=1}^\infty \frac{(1-d)^{n-1}}{(1+i)^n}$

As this is an example of a converging series for a geometric progression, this can be simplified further to become:

$PV = \frac{Itd}{i+d}$

The net present after-tax value of a capital investment then becomes:

$I \left (1-\frac{td}{i+d}\right )$

=== Half-year rule ===
For capital investments where CCA is calculated under the half-year rule, the CCA tax shield calculation is modified as follows:

$$\begin{align}
PV & = \frac{1}{2}\left (\frac{Itd}{i+d}\right ) + \frac{1}{2}\left (\frac{Itd}{i+d}\right )\left (\frac{1}{1+i}\right ) \\
& =\frac{Itd}{i+d}\left [\frac{1}{2} + \frac{\frac{1}{2}}{1+i}\right ] \\
& =\frac{Itd}{i+d}\left [\frac{\frac{1}{2}\left (1+i\right ) + \frac{1}{2}}{1+i}\right ] \\
& =\left (\frac{Itd}{i+d}\right )\left (\frac{1+\frac{1}{2}i}{1+i}\right ) \\
\end{align}$$

Therefore, the net present after-tax value of a capital investment is determined to be:

$I \left [ 1-\left (\frac{td}{i+d}\right )\left (\frac{1+\frac{1}{2}i}{1+i}\right ) \right ]$

== Case Law ==
In cases where claims have been contested or disallowed by the Canada Revenue Agency, the Supreme Court of Canada has interpreted the Capital Cost Allowance in a fairly broad manner, allowing deductions on property which was owned for a very brief period of time, and property which is leased back to the vendor from which it originated. These decisions demonstrate the flexibility of the Capital Cost Allowance as a legal tax reduction strategy.

== Impact ==
A notable example of how the Capital Cost Allowance can impact business activity was seen in the Canadian film industry in the 1970s, when the government of Pierre Trudeau introduced new regulations to facilitate the production of Canadian films by increasing the Capital Cost Allowance for film production to 100 per cent in 1974. While some important and noteworthy films were made under the program, and some film directors who released their first films in this era emerged as among Canada's most important and influential filmmakers of the era, the new regulations also had an entirely unforeseen side effect: a sudden rush of low-budget horror and genre films, intended as pure tax shelters since they were designed not to turn a conventional profit. Many of the films, in fact, were made by American filmmakers, whose projects had been rejected by the Hollywood studio system as not commercially viable.

The period officially ended in 1982, when the Capital Cost Allowance for film production was reduced to 50 per cent, although films that had entered production under the program continued to be released for another few years afterward.

== See also ==
- Income taxes in Canada
- MACRS - Modified Accelerated Cost Recovery System - U.S. Internal Revenue Code
