= Residual value =

Future value of a good in terms of absolute value

Residual value also known as salvage value describes the future value of a good in terms of absolute value in monetary terms after depreciation, and it is sometimes abbreviated into a percentage of the initial price when the item was new. It is one of the constituents of a leasing calculation or operation and is a key concept in accounting. It represents the amount of value that the owner of an asset can expect to obtain when the asset of its lease or when it reaches the end of its useful life.

Example: A car is sold at a list price of $20,000 today. After a usage of 36 months and 50,000 miles (ca. 80,467 km) its value is contractually defined as $10,000 or 50%. The credited amount, on which the interest is applied, thus is $20,000 present value minus the present value of $10,000 future value.

== Treatment ==
Residual values are contractually dealt with either in terms of closed or open contracts.

In accounting, residual value is another name for salvage value, the remaining value of an asset after it has been fully depreciated, or after deteriorating beyond further use.

The residual value derives its calculation from a base price, calculated after depreciation.

Residual values are calculated using a number of factors, generally a vehicle's market value for the term and mileage required is the start point for the calculation, followed by seasonality, monthly adjustment, lifecycle, and disposal performance. The leasing company setting the residual values (RVs) will use their own historical information to insert the adjustment factors within the calculation to set the end value being the residual value.

In accounting, the residual value could be defined as an estimated amount that an entity can obtain when disposing of an asset after its useful life has ended. When doing this, the estimated costs of disposing of the asset should be deducted.

The formula to calculate the residual value can be seen with the next example as follows:

A company owns a machine which was bought for €20,000. This machine has a useful life of five years, which has just ended. The company knows that if it sells the machine now, it will be able to recover 10% of the price of acquisition.

Therefore, the residual value would be:

$\text{Residual value} = 10\% \times (20{,}000) = 2{,}000$
