= Half-year convention =

For tax accounting, Half-year convention is a principle of United States taxation law.

Certain property is subject to depreciation. Depreciation allows one to deduct a certain amount of the value or basis of depreciable property per taxable year. A person with depreciable property must know when to start depreciating their property. The tax code explains how to do this through, what is called, the applicable convention.

In tax accounting, the half-year convention is the default applicable convention used for federal income tax purposes. Like other conventions, the half-year convention affects the depreciation deduction computation in the year in which the property is placed into service. Using the half-year convention, a taxpayer claims a half of a year's depreciation for the first taxable year, regardless of when the property was actually put into service. It is assumed that the property being depreciated was placed into service at the midpoint of the year. To compensate for this computation, the taxpayer is entitled to another half-year of depreciation at the end of the normal recovery period. § 168(d)(4) of the Federal Income Tax Code defines half-year convention as a convention which treats all property placed in service during any taxable year (or disposed of during any taxable year) as placed in service (or disposed of) on the midpoint of such taxable year.

== Example ==
Consider you are a taxpayer with five-year property worth $50,000. Also, assume that the property depreciates $10,000 per year.

Year 1- limited to half of the deduction normally entitled in a full year. One deduction of $5,000 allowed at the end of the year, since the property is put into service on July 1, year 1.

Year 2- $10,000 deduction taken. $5,000 deducted on June 30. $5,000 deducted on December 31.

Year 3- $10,000 deduction taken. $5,000 deducted on June 30. $5,000 deducted on December 31.

Year 4- $10,000 deduction taken. $5,000 deducted on June 30. $5,000 deducted on December 31.

Year 5- $10,000 deduction taken. $5,000 deducted on June 30. $5,000 deducted on December 31.

Year 6- $5,000 deduction taken on June 30.

== Practical effects ==
For taxpayers, the half-year convention does not require knowledge or proof of the date on which depreciable property is placed in service. Depreciable property is assumed to be placed into service on July 1 of the year in which it is placed into service. The Internal Revenue Service is fond of the rule because without it, taxpayers would be tempted to buy property in the second half of the year and claim full depreciation deductions as if the property were used for the entire year. Taxpayers like the rule because it does not require them to keep track of or prove exactly when depreciable property was placed into service. Nonetheless, the IRS is wary of abuse of the half-year convention. Under § 168(d)(3) of the Federal Income Tax Code, if a taxpayer purchases a lot of depreciable assets in the last three months of the taxable year, they may be forced to use the less beneficial "mid-quarter convention". This convention treats such property as placed into service in the midpoint of the last quarter of the taxable year. See § 168(d)(4)(c).
