= Construction in progress =

An accountancy term, construction in progress (CIP) asset or capital work in progress entry records the cost of construction work, which is not yet completed (typically, applied to capital budget items). A CIP item is not depreciated until the asset is placed in service. Normally, upon completion, a CIP item is reclassified, and the reclassified asset is capitalized and depreciated.

While costs are added to the construction in progress, related CIP account is debited with corresponding credits to accounts payable, accrued expenses, inventory, cash, and others. When the construction in progress is completed, related long-term asset account is debited and CIP account is credited.
