= Depreciation recapture =

American income tax procedure

Depreciation recapture is the USA Internal Revenue Service (IRS) procedure for collecting income tax on a gain realized by a taxpayer when the taxpayer disposes of an asset that had previously provided an offset to ordinary income for the taxpayer through depreciation. In other words, because the IRS allows a taxpayer to deduct the depreciation of an asset from the taxpayer's ordinary income, the taxpayer has to report any gain from the disposal of the asset (up to the recomputed basis) as ordinary income, not as a capital gain.

Depreciation recapture most commonly applies when dealing with the sale of improved real estate (such as rental property), as the value of real estate generally increases over time while the improvements are subject to depreciation.

Depreciation recapture in the USA is governed by sections 1245 and 1250 of the Internal Revenue Code (IRC). Any gain over the recomputed basis will be taxed as a capital gain in accordance with section 1231 of the IRC.

Other countries have similar procedures. In the UK, HMRC uses "negative depreciation".

== Basis ==
The starting point for determining when a depreciation recapture will occur is to determine the basis of the asset. There are three different types of basis: original, adjusted, and recomputed basis.

The original basis of an asset is usually the value of a taxpayer's investment in the asset. (See IRC § 1012). When a taxpayer purchases an asset, the original basis is the purchase price, or cost, of the asset. Different factors, including tax deductions for depreciation, can lead to an adjusted or recomputed basis for the asset. (See IRC § 1016 and IRC § 1245(a)(2)(A)).

An adjusted basis under IRC 1016 is the original basis of a piece of property plus any increases for improvements to the property or any decreases for depreciation deductions allowed or allowable with respect to such property. So, if a taxpayer buys something for $100,000, and allowable deductions under IRC 167 for the next 3 years are $5000 per year, the taxpayer's adjusted basis is $85,000.

Recomputed basis under IRC 1245(a)(2) basically means, with respect to any property, its adjusted basis recomputed by adding all adjustments reflected on account of deductions allowed or allowable to the taxpayer for depreciation. In the previous example, the taxpayer's recomputed basis would be $100,000 because you add to the adjusted basis the amounts the taxpayer depreciated.

If a taxpayer sells an asset for less than its basis, then the taxpayer has taken a loss. If the taxpayer sells the asset for more than its basis, the taxpayer has experienced a gain. For example, if a taxpayer purchased a widget for $1,000, the original basis of the widget would be $1,000. If the taxpayer sold the widget for $1,500, the taxpayer would experience a capital gain of $500.

== Depreciation ==
When a taxpayer purchases a tax-deductible asset for use over several years, the taxpayer can deduct a percentage of the asset's value from their yearly taxable income over the life of the asset. (See IRC § 167, 168 and the IRS tables of class lives and recovery periods). The IRS publishes specific depreciation schedules for different classes of assets. The schedules tell a taxpayer what percentage of an asset's value may be deducted each year and the number of years in which the deductions may be taken. The values of these deductions are used to determine the asset's recomputed basis at the time the taxpayer sells the asset. (See IRC § 1245(a)(2)(A)).

For example, if a taxpayer purchased a widget with a $1,000 basis, then deducted $100 from their ordinary income each year for the widget's depreciation, after four years the widget's adjusted basis would be $600. The accumulated depreciation on the widget during that time is $400.

== Computing depreciation recapture ==
When a taxpayer sells an asset for a gain after taking deductions for depreciation, depreciation recapture is used to tax the gain. Because the taxpayer received a deduction from ordinary income for the depreciation of the asset, any gain the taxpayer receives, up to the depreciation amount, must be included as ordinary income to offset the earlier deduction. Any gain above that is a capital gain subject to capital gains tax rates (usually more favorable).

For example, the widget discussed above had an original basis of $1,000. The taxpayer took $400 worth of depreciation deductions from their ordinary income over the course of four years. At the end of those four years, the taxpayer's adjusted basis in the asset had changed to $600. If the taxpayer then sells the asset for $700, then they would realize a gain of $100. Because they received depreciation deductions, they would be required to include the $100 gain as part of their ordinary income. This is a depreciation recapture.

However, if taxpayer instead sells the widget for $1300, because their adjusted basis is $600, the result is a $700 gain. Of that amount, $400 of the gain (equivalent to the total amount of depreciation taken during the time owned) is taxed as ordinary income, and the remaining $300 is taxed at the more favorable capital gains tax rate.

== Loss ==
If depreciable property is sold for less than its adjusted basis, the taxpayer generally realizes a loss and no depreciation recapture applies. However, the taxpayer may qualify for ordinary loss treatment under IRC § 1231.

== Property affected ==
IRC § 1245(a)(3) lists the property for which depreciation recapture rules apply. Under IRC § 1245(a)(3)(A), all personal property that can provide a depreciation offset to ordinary income is subject to depreciation recapture. Under rules contained in the current Internal Revenue Code, real property is not subject to depreciation recapture. However, under IRC § 1(h)(1)(D), real property that has experienced a gain after providing a taxpayer with a depreciation deduction is subject to a 25% tax rate—10% higher than the usual rate for a capital gain. This higher tax rate serves as a rough surrogate for depreciation recapture.

== See also ==
- Limits on Depreciation Deduction
- Section 179 depreciation deduction
