= Daimler DZVR 21 =

German Armored Fighting Vehicle

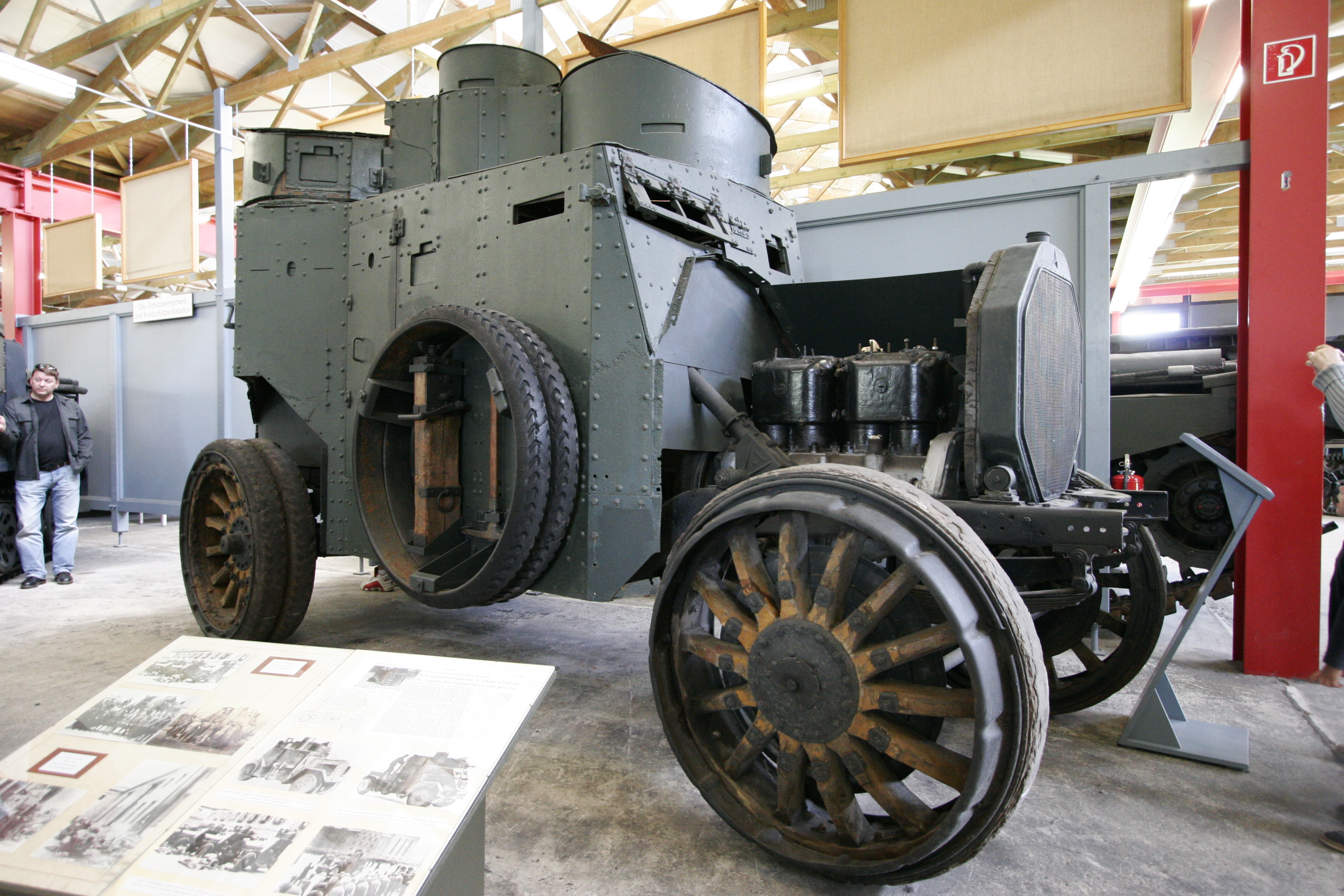
- Daimler DZVR 21 in the Munster Tank Museum
- Place of origin: Germany

Production history
- Designer: Krupp-Daimler
- Manufacturer: Daimler, Erhardt, Benz

Specifications
- Mass: 12.0t
- Length: 5.95m
- Width: 2.20m
- Height: 3.27m
- Crew: 7–9
- Armour: 4 to 12mm chrome nickel steel
- Main armament: 2 MG 08 (1 MG per turret)
- Engine: Daimler M-1574 4-cylinder petrol engine 74 kW (100 hp)

The Daimler DZVR 21 is a light armored vehicle from the Weimar Republic era. A surviving example is in the Munster Tank Museum.

== Development ==
The basis for the DZVR was the artillery tractor Krupp-Daimler 100 PS KD 1 from the First World War.

The first stage of development was a vehicle which was designated as the DZR/19. The first test setups were placed on this vehicle, which can be distinguished from the following types by the wheels of different heights. In the next step, the chassis was fundamentally changed. The subsequent model, known as the DZR/19, received a steering system for a driver steering from the rear in reverse. 40 of these vehicles were manufactured and delivered to the various state police forces. These are documented with photographs in Baden, Bavaria and Saxony. The vehicles were loaned to the Reichswehr for military exercises.

The Type 19 had an armored superstructure with a single turret in the middle and with significantly less angled armor plates than the later Type 21 vehicle. It was roughly similar to the Ehrhardt E-V/4 street armored vehicle.

The later structure of the Daimler Type 21 was similar to that of the Benz Type 21 (24 units) and the Ehrhardt Type21 (30 units), since this structure, made of high-quality chrome-nickel steel, was almost identical for all vehicles. However, adjustments had to be made for the respective chassis. The bottom of the vehicle was armored with 4mm thick plates to protect the crew from hand grenades under the vehicle. Operations in an urban environment with a short range of operations required reinforced armor, which at the same time meant more weight. Since the vehicle was to be used primarily on paved roads, it received front and rear wheels of the same size with solid rubber tires. With only one steerable axle, the driver had to steer very carefully when reversing.

The difficulties of the post-war period meant that these vehicles could only be handed over to the state police from about 1924

== Operational history ==
In 1918, the last year of the First World War, the manufacture of armored cars was neglected. In view of the armed unrest that later flared up everywhere in the German Reich, the law enforcement agencies saw an increased need for such vehicles. The Reich Army handed over around 50 street armored cars to the police organizations for this purpose. According to the draft peace treaty, the German security forces were granted 150 pieces.

The ratified Peace Treaty of Versailles of June 28, 1919 prohibited the German Reich from owning and developing armored combat vehicles (with tracks) and wheeled armored vehicles for the army. With the approval of the inter-allied military control commission, armored vehicles could be handed over to the protection and regulatory police of the German federal states. According to the terms of the treaty, the Reich Army was allowed to own 105 unarmed, armored personnel carriers.

Most of the vehicles were scrapped in early 1939 as there were more modern and better vehicles. Of the 125 special police cars that were still in stock in 1935, only 40 were operational by 1938. A single vehicle survived until 1945. This vehicle was documented with a lot of damage by photos in the inner courtyard of the former Berlin Reich Chancellery

== Variants ==
Schupo - Special Car Daimler/21

The Reich Ministry of the Interior coordinated the production of the Schupo special cars for all countries of the German Reich. For the police, 31-33 copies of the DZVR were produced as Schupo - Sonderwagen 21 at the Daimler works in Berlin-Marienfelde. The police Daimler/21 had turrets with machine guns, unlike the vehicles of the Reich Army. In 1928 the police had 110 Schupo special vehicles. A surviving example is on display at the Munster Tank Museum.

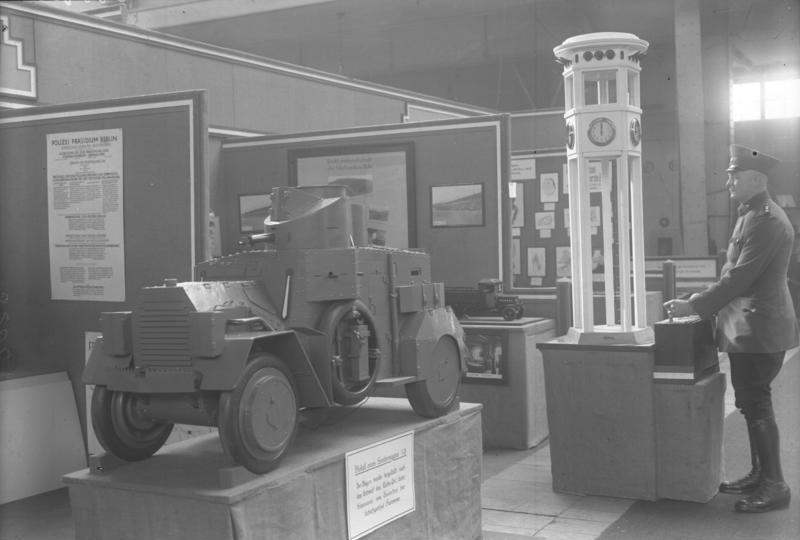
DZVR 19, single tower, pointed "side bay"

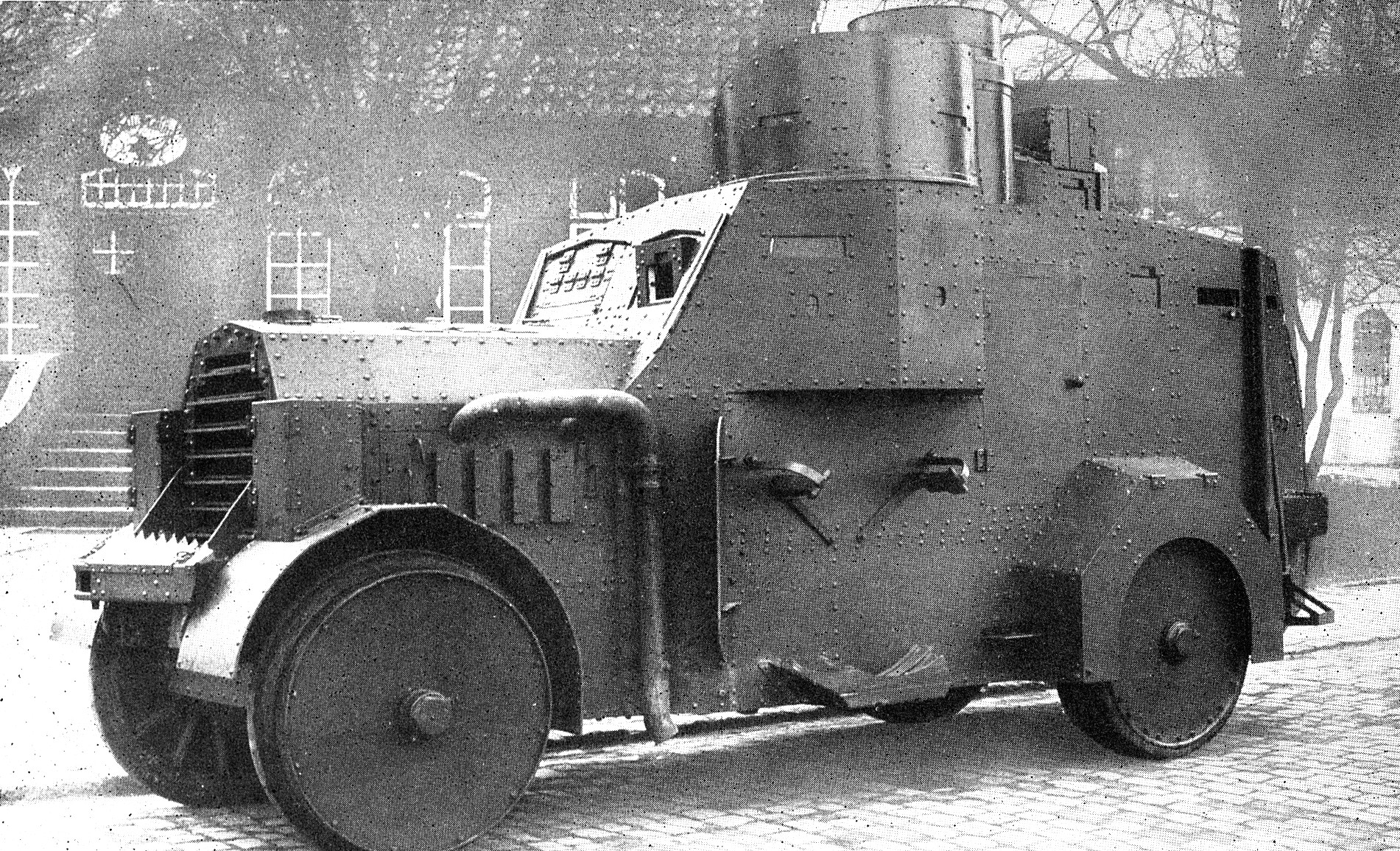
Ehrhardt/21, double tower, flat "side bay window"

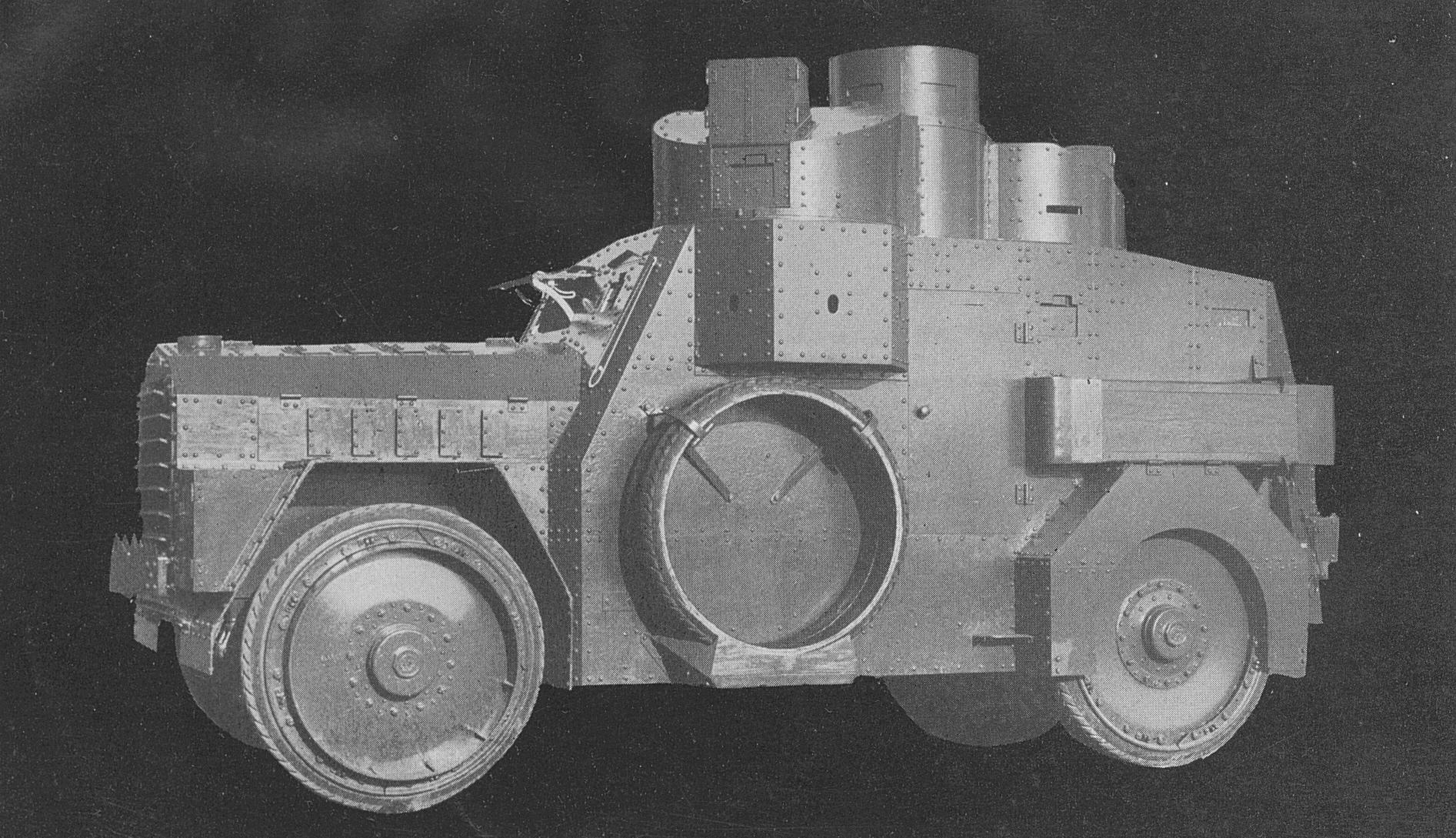
Benz/21 VP21, double tower, flat "side bay"

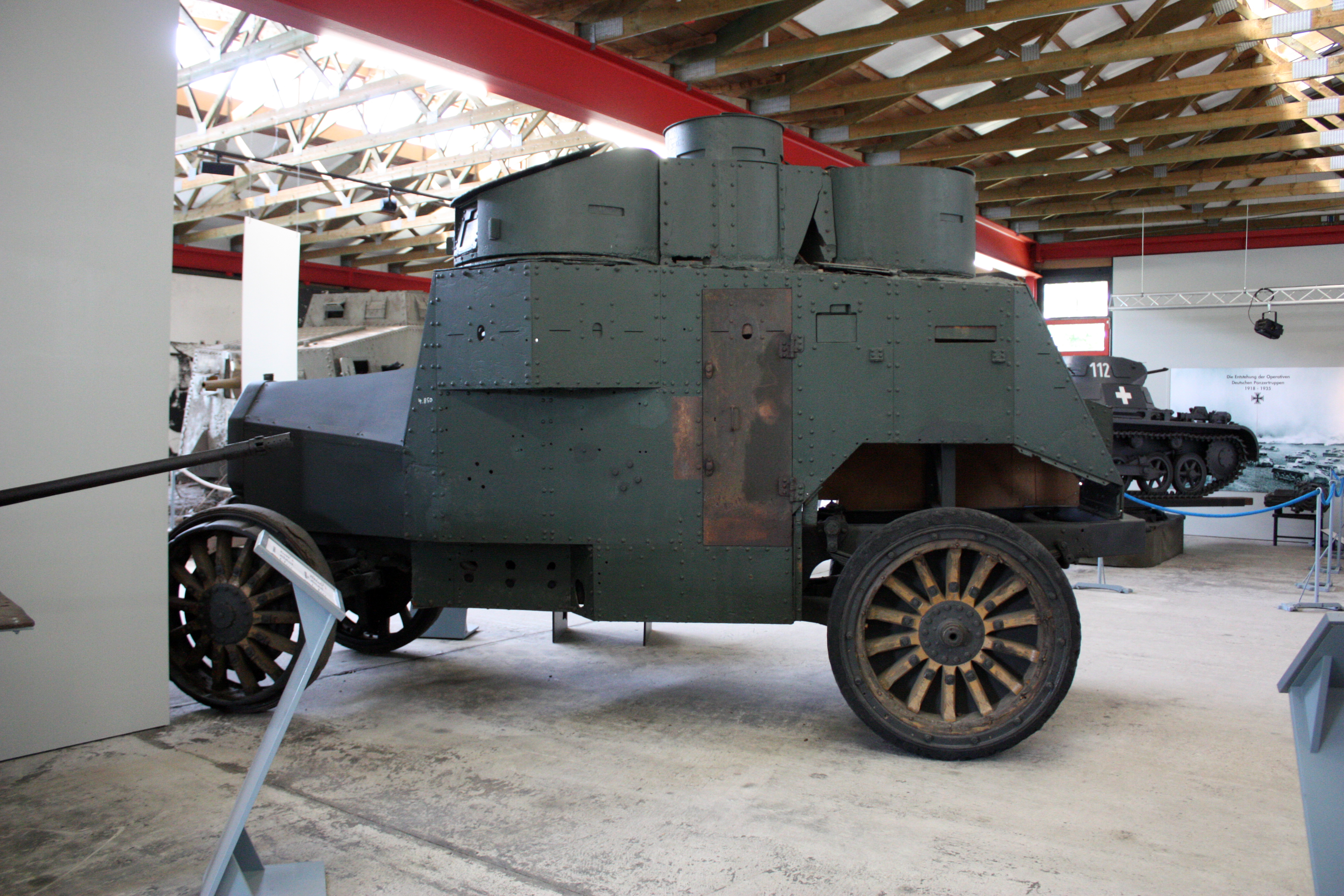
Daimler DZVR 21, double tower pointed "side bay window"

Armored Motor Vehicle Sd.Kfz. 3

The Sd.Kfz. 3 featured rotating turrets with no machine guns installed. These vehicles had a square structure on the roof to ensure headroom. There was also a variant with radio equipment, which can be recognized by a surrounding loop antenna. Since the vehicles in no way corresponded to the desired new type of warfare and were not suitable for off-road use, the Reichswehr never exhausted the quota of 105 vehicles granted under the Treaty of Versailles.

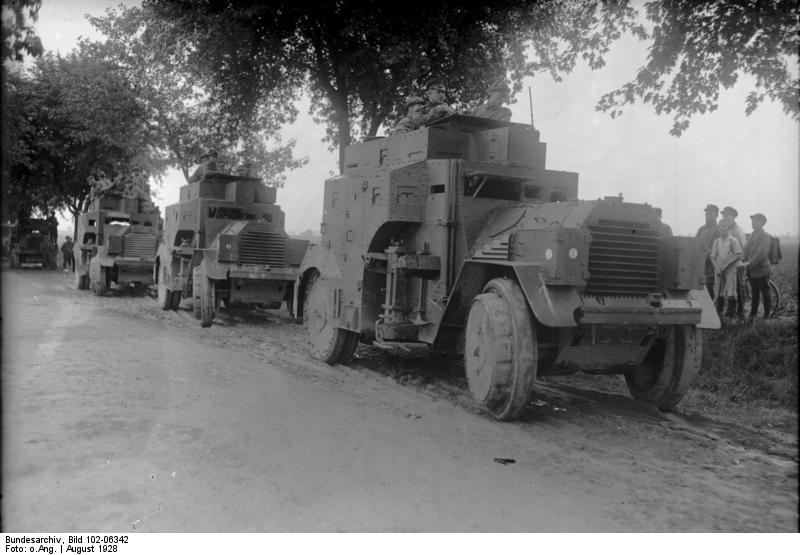
Sd.Kfz. 3, military variant "Armoured Motor Vehicle" with a significantly different structure

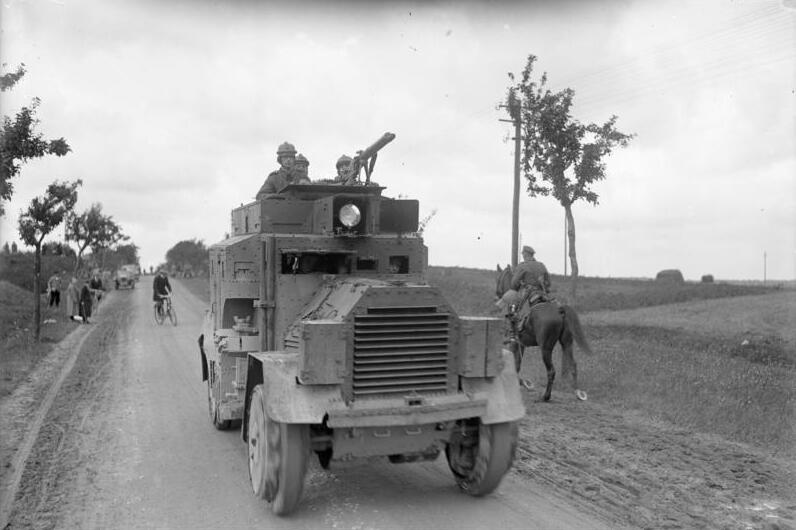
Sd.Kfz.3 with mounted MG
