= Limits on Depreciation Deduction =

Provision of US tax law

For taxation in the United States, the Limits on Depreciation Deduction (Section 280F) was enacted to limit certain deductions on depreciable assets. Section 280F is a policy that makes the Internal Revenue Code more accurate by allowing a taxpayer to report their business use on an asset they may also need for some personal reasons.

== General description ==
To put 280F in context a general understanding of 167(a) and 179 is useful.

Section 167(a) allows a depreciation deduction for property used in the trade or business of the taxpayer. If property is used partially for business and partially for personal use, the basis of the property must be allocated between those uses.

Under Section 179, a taxpayer may elect to expense (deduct) all or a portion of the cost of the depreciable property purchased during the taxable year if it was intended to have a business use, despite generally having to capitalize this property. However, Section 280F was enacted to limit these deductions on certain listed property.

== Property ==
Listed property includes luxury automobiles as well as the other assets listed in 280F(d)(4). For passenger automobiles, section 280F(a)(1)(A) limits the depreciation deduction by listing the amounts a taxpayer can deduct in the years following its purchase. These listed amounts are subject to an adjustment for inflation under 280F(d)(7).(a) The sum for 2007, after adjustment for inflation, is $12,800. These limits seem to reflect what the legislature means by using the term "luxury automobile."

Passenger automobiles fall within the definition of "listed property" as well. 280F(d)(4)(i), see also Ferrada v. Commissioner, T.C. Summary Opinion 2004-93 (2004). Other "listed property" is subjected to more limitations, under 168(g), if it is "not predominantly used in a qualified business." 280F(b)(1). If listed property is not used for a qualified business, the accelerated depreciation deductions will be recaptured under 280F(b)(2). Whether a listed property qualifies as being used predominantly for business is determined by section 280F(b)(3).

== Business use ==
Under 280F(b)(3), if the business use is less than 50%, only straight-line depreciation may be used. Even if the taxpayer uses the automobile, or other listed property, exclusively for business use, the depreciation deductions are still limited by 280F(b)(3). There are some exceptions as seen in 280F(d)(5)(B) and 280F(d)(6)(C).

== See also ==
- Depreciation recapture
- Quantity Surveyor
- Section 179 depreciation deduction
