= Furniture, fixtures and equipment (accounting) =

Furniture, fixtures and equipment (FF&E) (sometimes Furniture, furnishings, and equipment) is an accounting term used in valuing, selling, or liquidating a company or a building.

FF&E are movable furniture, fixtures, or other equipment that have no permanent connection to the structure of a building or utilities. These items depreciate substantially but are important costs to consider when valuing a company, especially in liquidation.

Examples of FF&E include desks, chairs, computers, electronic equipment, tables, bookcases, and partitions.

Sometimes the term FF&A is used (furniture, fixtures, and accessories).
