= Applicable convention =

An applicable convention, as presented in 26 U.S.C. § 168(d) of the United States Internal Revenue Code, is an assumption about when property is placed into service. It is used to determine when property depreciation begins. The purpose of applicable conventions is to simplify depreciation because they do not require a taxpayer to prove to the IRS when every piece of depreciable property was placed into service.

There are three types of conventions. The first, the “half-year convention,” assumes that all property placed into service, or disposed of, during a taxable year was placed into service, or disposed of, at the midpoint of that year. (§ 168(d)(4)(A)) Section 168(d)(1) states that all taxpayers should use the half-year convention unless a different convention is specifically required by § 168(d)(2) or § 168(d)(3).

The second, the “mid-month convention,” assumes that all property placed into service, or disposed of, during any month was placed into service, or disposed of, at the midpoint of that month. (§ 168(d)(4)(B)) Section 168(d)(2) tells a taxpayer when it is appropriate to use the mid-month convention.

The third, the “mid-quarter convention,” assumes that all property placed into service, or disposed of, during any quarter of a taxable year was placed into service, or disposed of, at the midpoint of that quarter. (§ 168(d)(4)(C)) Section 168(d)(3) tells a taxpayer when it is appropriate to use the mid-quarter convention. Specifically, if a taxpayer buys a lot of depreciable assets in the last three months of the taxable year, the taxpayer will in some cases be forced to use the mid-quarter convention, resulting in an even smaller depreciation deduction in the first year as compared to the half-year convention.

== Half-year convention ==
This convention applies to all depreciable tangible personal property.

Exemptions include:

- Residential rental and non residential real property
- Property subject to mid-quarter convention

== Mid-quarter convention ==
If more than 40% of the total basis of property is placed in service during the last three months of the tax year, the mid-quarter convention applies.

Exemptions include:

- Property that is being depreciated under a method other than MACRS.
- Any residential rental property, nonresidential real property, or railroad gradings and tunnel bores.
- Property that is placed in service and disposed of within the same tax year.

== Mid-month convention ==
The mid-month convention applies only to real property. Under the mid-month convention, one-half month of depreciation is allowed for the month the asset is placed in service or disposed of and a full month of depreciation is allowed for each additional month of the year that the asset is in service.
