= DPMS =

DPMS may refer to:

- DOS Protected Mode Services, a set of extended DOS memory management services since 1992
- VESA Display Power Management Signaling, a graphics card power management standard since 1993
- DPMS Panther Arms, a United States firearms manufacturer

== See also ==
- DBMS
- PMS
