= Diversified Project Management =

American consulting company

Founded in 1989, Diversified Project Management is a New England–based owners’ representative consulting company headquartered in Newton, Massachusetts. With additional offices in Hartford, Connecticut, and Stamford, Connecticut, Diversified Project Management specializes in programming, project management, construction administration, FF&E coordination and move-planning services for corporate, education, health care, manufacturing and biotechnology construction, renovation and relocation projects.

== Management team ==
- Robert M. Keeley, Jr., president
- Philip Leonard, vice president of operations
- Bill Clegg, Vice President of Operations
- Mark DuPre, ASHE, Assoc. AIA, vice president and project executive
- John A. Waitkunas, Vice President & project executive
- Greg Lewis, Vice President, R&D market segment leader
- Carolyn Hern, director of business development
- Alicia Lawless, communications manager

== History ==
Diversified Project Management established its Boston office in 1989, with the mission of providing objective tenant representation, project programming, construction administration, facilities management and move coordination services. Diversified Project Management later founded its Hartford office in 1996 to better serve the Hartford, New Haven and Western Massachusetts markets. In 2007, Diversified Project Management added its Stamford location, serving Fairfield and Westchester counties in Connecticut and New York. Diversified Project Management has since opened an office in Providence, Rhode Island.

== Industries ==
=== Academic ===
Diversified provided move management services for the Life Sciences Facility at Brown University. This research center houses the departments of molecular biology, cellular biology and biochemistry and neuroscience. With 60 new laboratories, the project modernized the departments and expanded laboratory and research capacity at Brown by 50 percent. It was designed to encourage scientific collaboration among faculty; staff and students by uniting complementary research under one roof.

=== Corporate ===
Diversified managed the corporate relocation project for CVS into their 217,000-square-foot (20,200 m^{2}) Support Center Expansion space in Woonsocket, Rhode Island. The multi-phased relocation management was broken into three projects focusing on moving employees into the new space, relocation into the vacated and renovated existing space and bringing staff in from various CVS facilities in the surrounding areas. Over 1,000 staff members were moved in the process. Along with master timeline generation and overall move management services, DPM oversaw the furniture knockdown/reconfiguration and installation of new systems.

=== Healthcare ===
Diversified was hired to centralize Partners HealthCare's finance department, by consolidating seven offices into 200,000 square feet (19,000 m^{2}) of space on two-and-a-half floors at the Schrafft Center, in Charlestown, Massachusetts. The project scope included programming and move management for approximately 800 people.

=== High tech and industrial ===
MRO Software retained Diversified for the renovation of 100,000 square feet (9,300 m^{2}) of office space and relocation of over 300 employees in Bedford, Massachusetts. Diversified's responsibilities included overall project management, design development coordination, general contractor selection and administration, value engineering, voice and data coordination, furniture selection and management and move planning. Diversified acted as MRO's representative.

Diversified was retained to manage Acme Packet's office and lab build out and relocation. Acme Packet relocated from their single, floor office space in Woburn to a new two-story state-of-the-art building in Burlington, where they nearly doubled in size to 43,061 square feet (4,000.5 m^{2}) of space as the sole tenant. The move involved 84 staff members, 60 workstations, manufacturing areas and a test lab.

=== Non-profit ===
Jewish Family & Children's Services Diversified was retained to provide project management for Jewish Family & Children's Services relocation to a 40,000-square-foot (3,700 m^{2}) building in Waltham, Massachusetts. The move involved 120 employees from two separate locations in Newton and Boston.

=== Pharmaceutical and biotech ===
Eisai Research Institute Diversified managed the relocation for 120 employees into a180,000-square-foot (17,000 m^{2}) laboratory and office in Andover, Massachusetts. The project included renovating and expanding building four on the Andover campus to include more office space and the addition of an elevator and stairway. Simultaneously, building five on the campus was demolished to make way for the construction of a new 180,000-square-foot (17,000 m^{2}) office and laboratory building. A connector was built between building four and the new building to facilitate easy access between the buildings for company personnel.

=== Public, municipal, and state governments ===
Diversified managed the relocation of the United States Coast Guard from its facility located at the University of Connecticut campus at Avery Point in Groton, Connecticut. Diversified oversaw the entire 60,000-square-foot (5,600 m^{2}) project from the evaluation and selection of a new property to the coordination of the move into the new space. The office facility is designed for 170 employees and 10-percent of the real estate was designed as research lab space.
