= German Tank Museum =

German Tank Museum (Deutsches Panzermuseum)
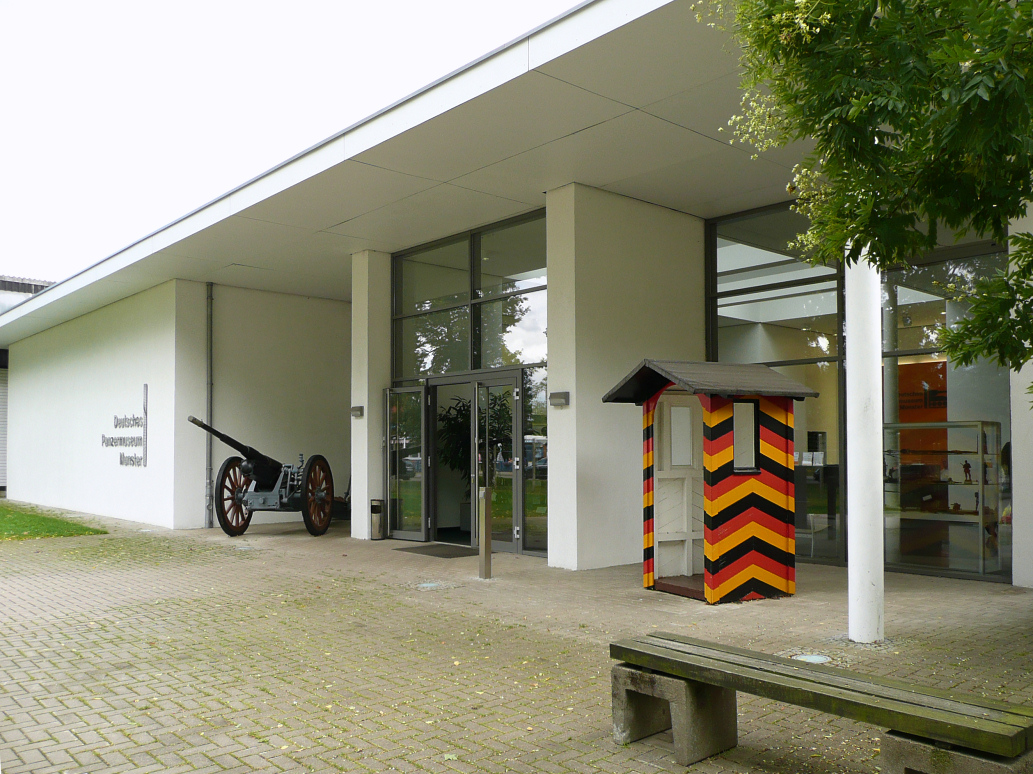
- Museum Entrance (2011)

- Location in Lower Saxony
- Established: 1983; 43 years ago
- Location: Munster, Germany
- Coordinates: 52°59′13″N 10°06′38″E
- Type: Military Museum
- Visitors: 113,796 (2015)
- Director: Ralf Raths
- Website: www.daspanzermuseum.de

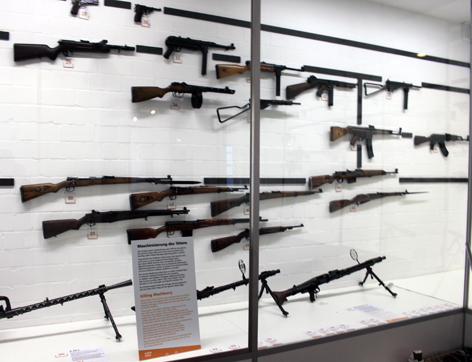
"Elements of War" in German Tank Museum, Iron path

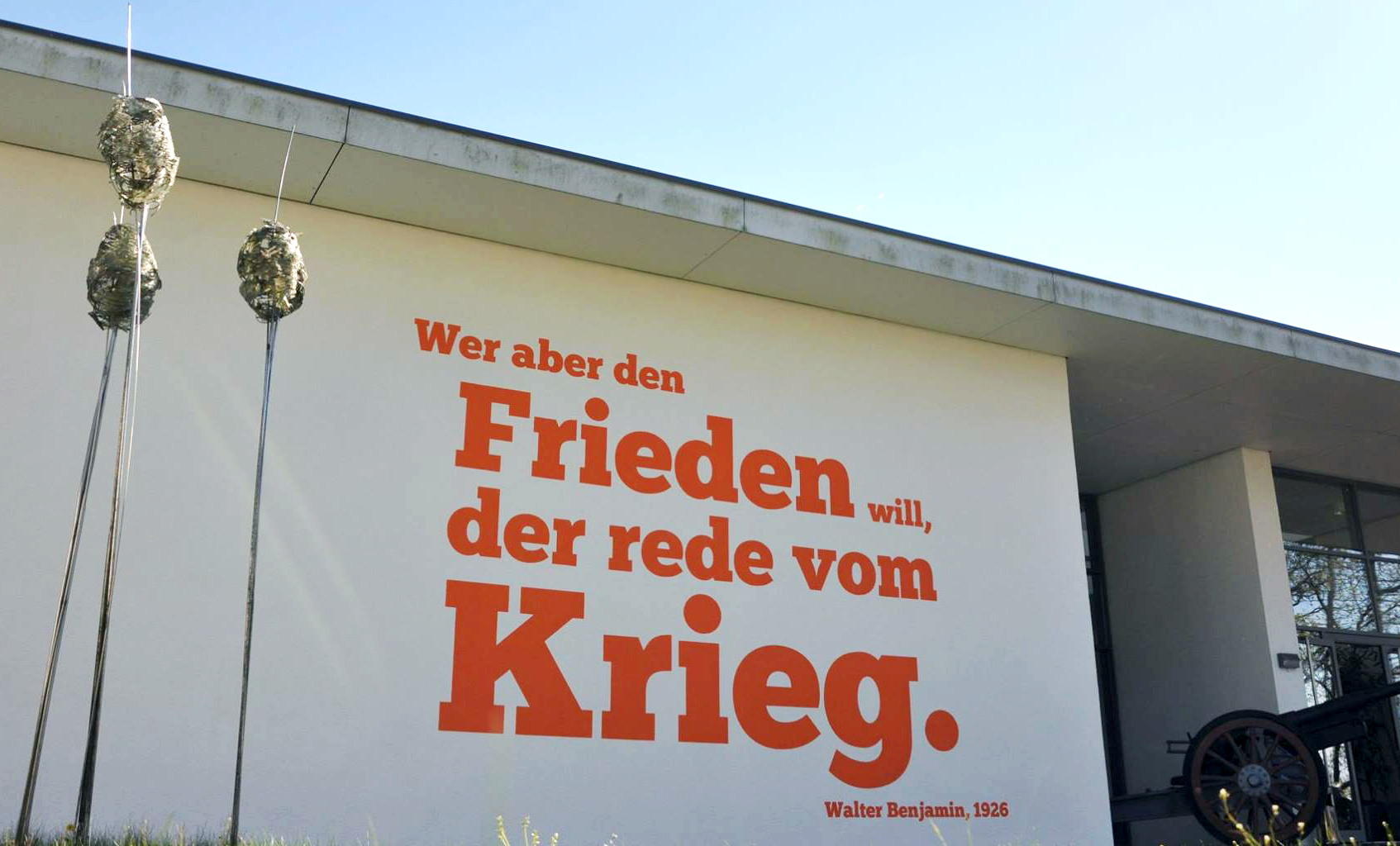
"But if you want peace, talk about war" - quote by German author Walter Benjamin at the entrance

The German Tank Museum (German: Deutsches Panzermuseum Munster (DPM)) is an armoured fighting vehicle museum in Munster, Germany, (Note: Not to be confused with the city of Münster) the location of the Munster Training Area camp. Its main aim is the documentation of the history of German armoured troops since 1917.

It originated in 1983 from the instructional collection of the Panzertruppenschule, the Bundeswehr (German Army) school for training officers and NCOs of German armoured units. It is now a museum open to the public, jointly run by the municipality of Munster and the Lehrsammlung der Panzertruppen und Heeresaufklärungstruppe am Ausbildungszentrum Munster (teaching collections of the armoured combat troops).

The museum site covers an area of over 9,000 square metres (97,000 sq ft). including 7,500 square metres (81,000 sq ft) of exhibition halls. In 2003 the museum opened a new building for special displays, a museum shop and a cafeteria.

== Exhibits ==
The museum displays tanks, military vehicles, weapons, small arms, uniforms, medals, decorations and military equipment from World War I to the present day. The heart of the exhibition is a collection of about 40 Bundeswehr and former East German (Nationale Volksarmee) tanks as well as 40 German tanks and other Wehrmacht vehicles from the Second World War. In addition there are tanks from the Soviet Red Army, the British Army and the United States Army from the Second World War, as well as other modern tanks such as the Israeli Merkava. There is also one Swedish tank, the Stridsvagn m/21-29, a modified German LK II. Most of the vehicles are in working order, with restoration work ongoing to render all examples functional. The restoration staff of the museum do extensive research on every vehicle in order to return it to its original configuration and paint scheme. The large collection of armoured vehicles includes some rare or unique types. For example, the museum has a replica of an A7V German First World War tank, the only example of its type in (continental) Europe, with the only other being at The Tank Museum. Also, there is an armoured police vehicle from the Weimar Republic era, the Daimler DZVR 21. In addition it has one of only two existing Sturmpanzer VI as well as a prototype version of the Jagdpanzer IV. From the post-war era there is a range of Bundeswehr prototypes, including a Leopard 1, Kanonenjagdpanzer tank destroyer and MBT-70, the abortive US-German design. The interior of a Leopard 1 tank, situated outside, can be entered via a flight of steps and a ladder in the turret.

By its own account the museum does not just want to show tanks as an exhibit of history of technology. With the ongoing reforms it wants to put them in a scientific-historical context. Tanks as technical objects are seen as starting points for broader historical contexts, which the museum wants to the tell of his exhibits in many historical perspectives: as Social, Economic, Political and Cultural History. As an actor in modern military history the museum still includes the old perspectives of the museum: operational history and political history still have their place in the Tank Museum.

The Elemente des Krieges ("Elements of War"), thematically groups smaller exhibits into four areas or "paths":

- The "Iron" path displays small arms and ammunition from 17th century to the present and focusses primarily on the history of technology.
- The "Textile" path displays uniforms from late 19th century to the present; these exhibits focus mainly on social history.
- The "Gold" path presents medals and decorations from late 19th century to the present; these exhibits focus on cultural history.
- The "Wood" path displays war toys from 20th and 21st century and primarily concentrates on everyday history.

Further special exhibits are the death mask of Erwin Rommel and his tunic, which was thought to be an original for a long time. The fake uniform is now exhibited with an explanation of how the forgery was discovered and why a museum has to examine its exhibits time and again.

== Gallery ==
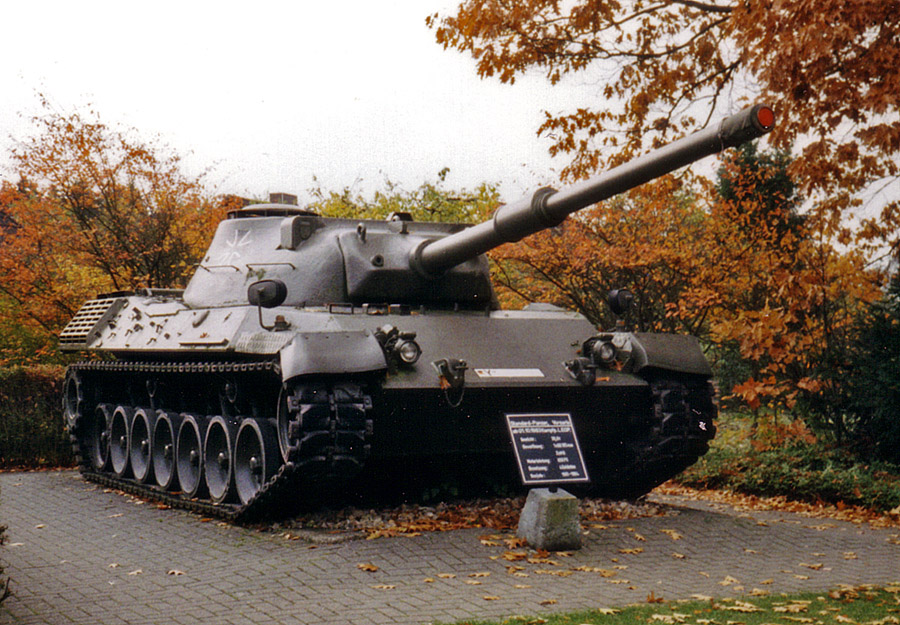
Leopard 1 Prototype A2

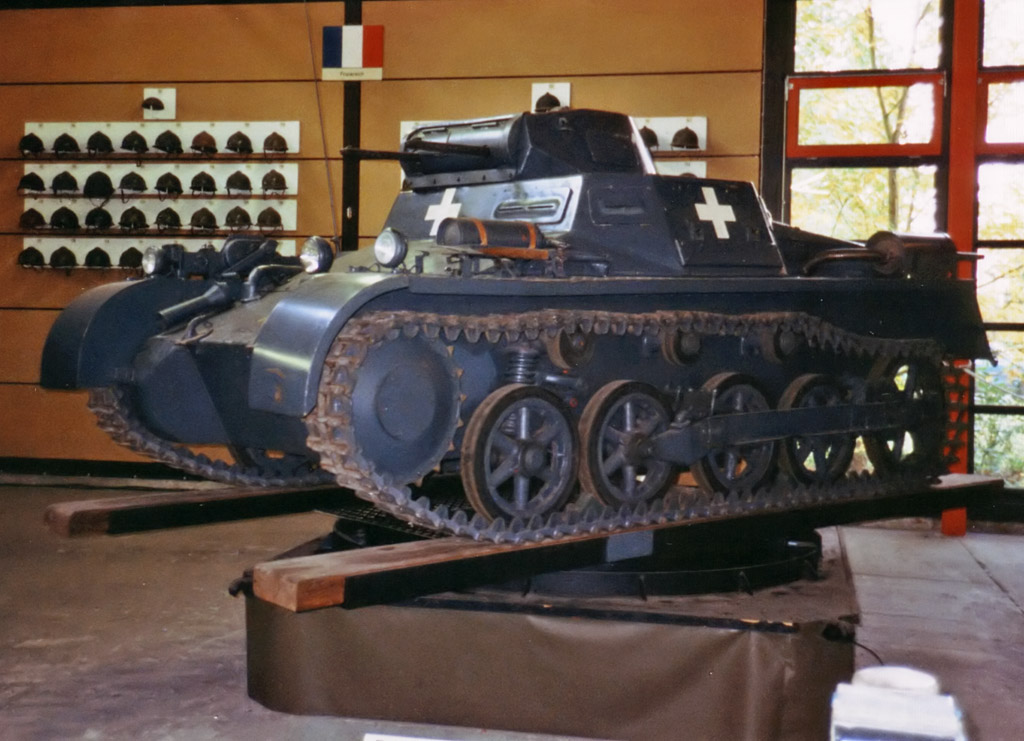
Panzer I Ausf. A on a turntable

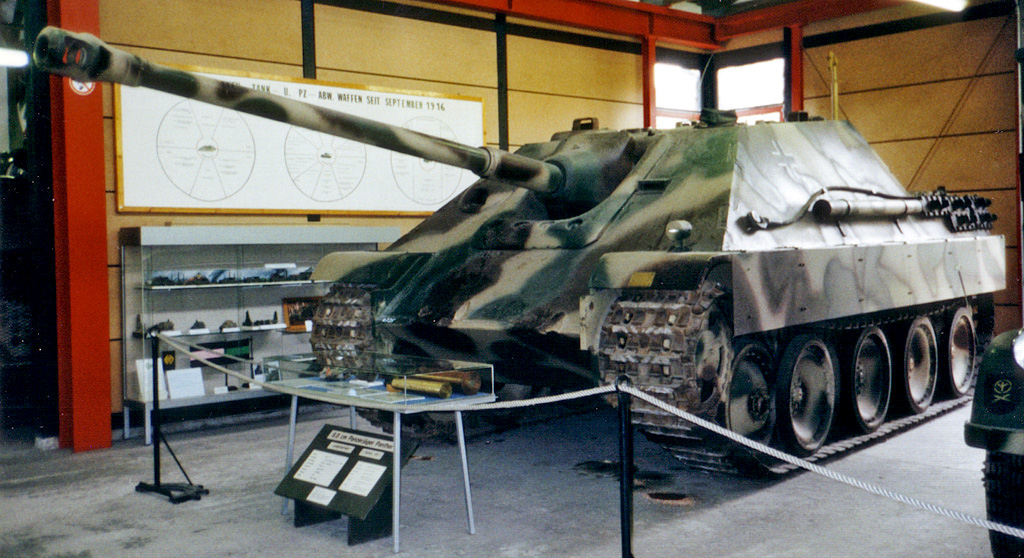
Jagdpanther

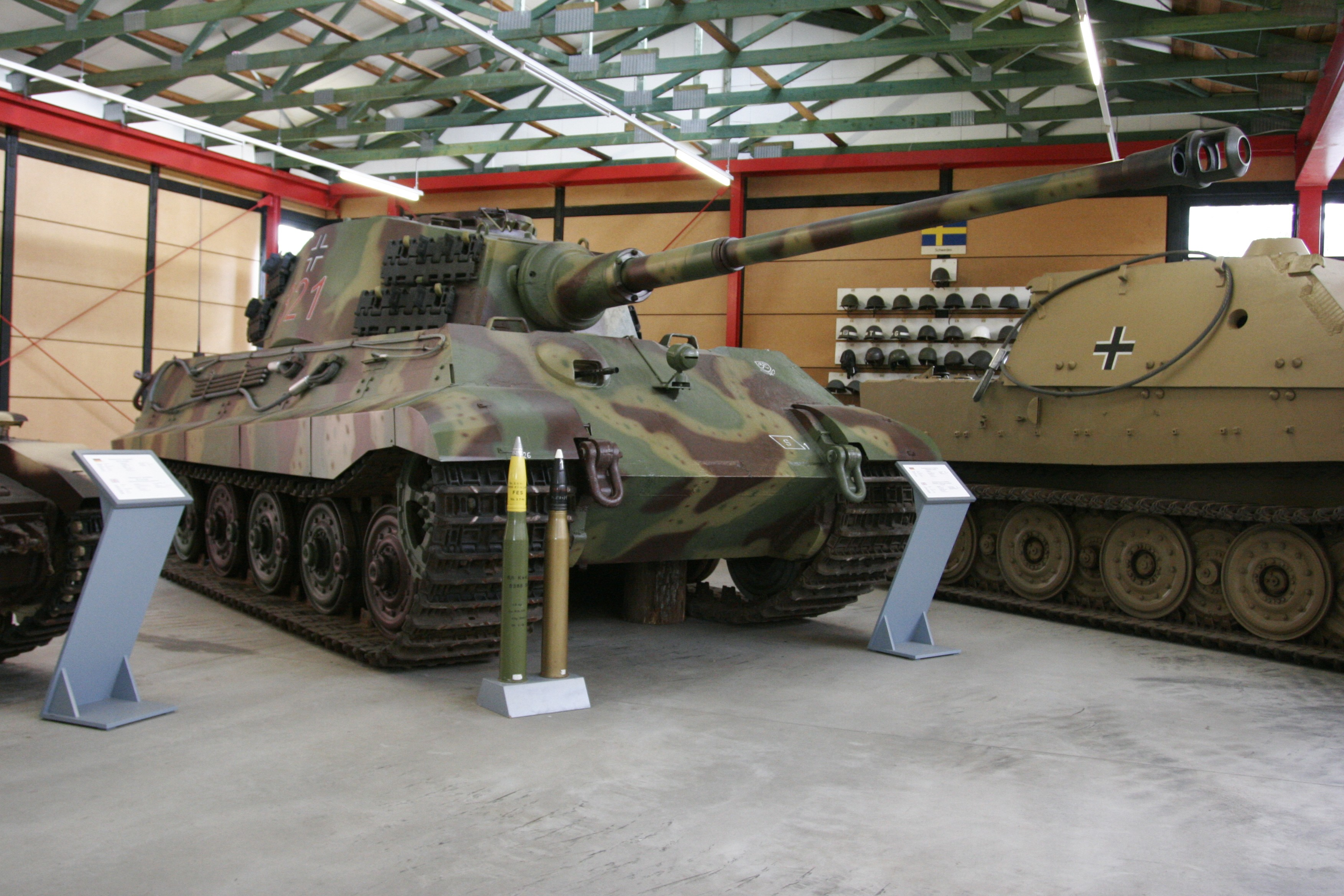
Tiger II with the production turret

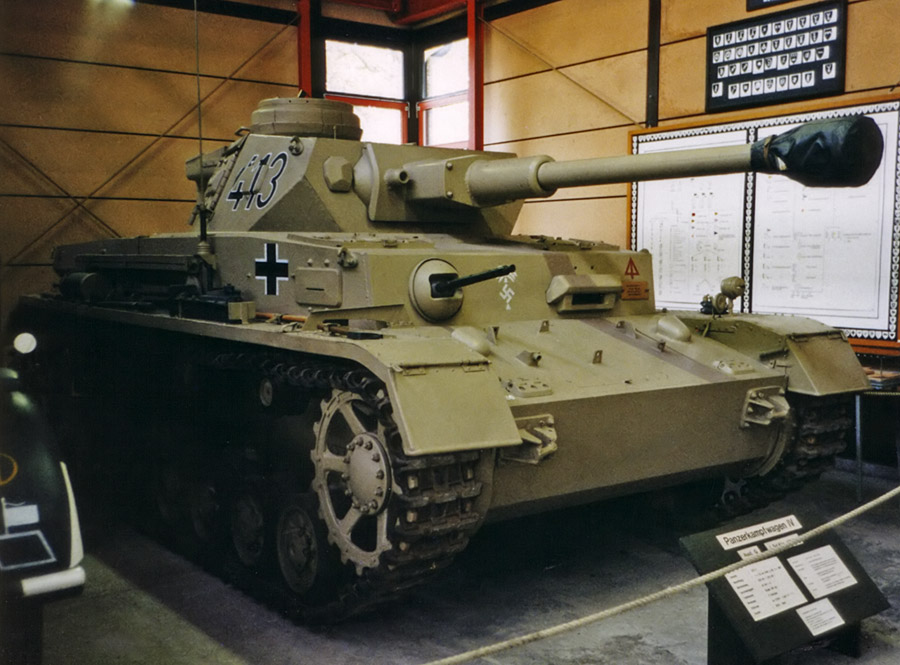
Panzer IV Ausf. G

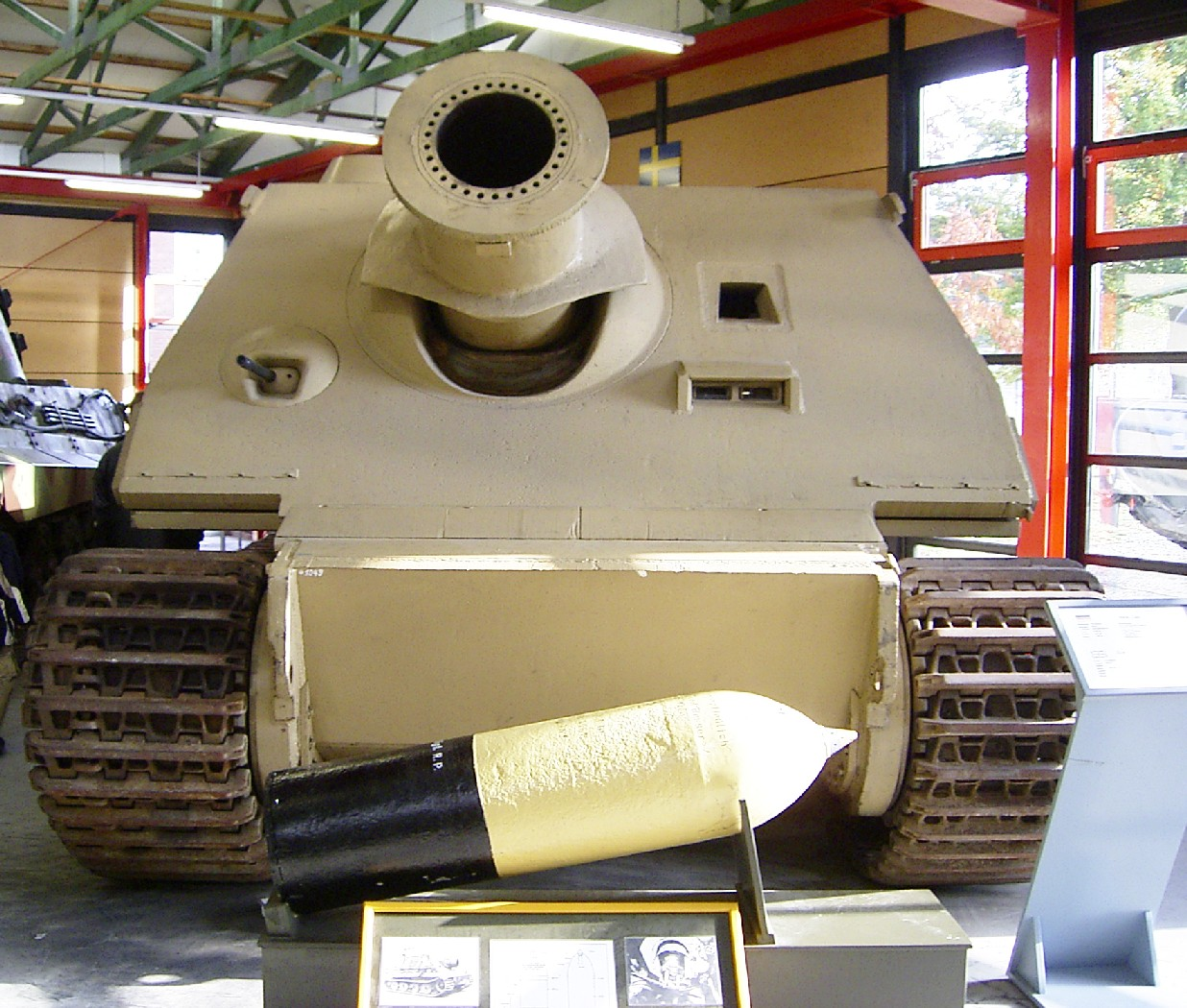
Sturmpanzer VI Sturmtiger

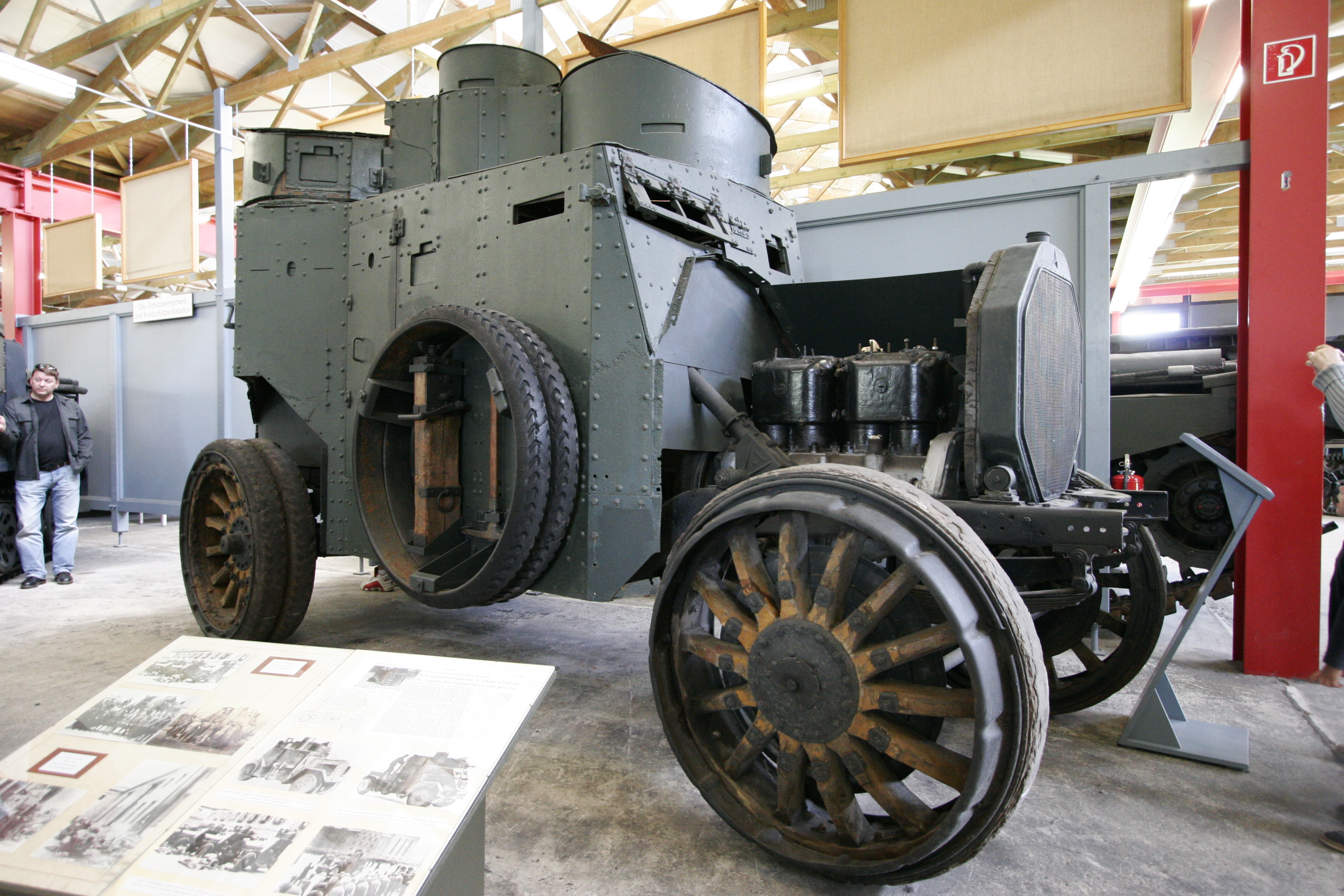
Daimler DZVR 21 police special vehicle

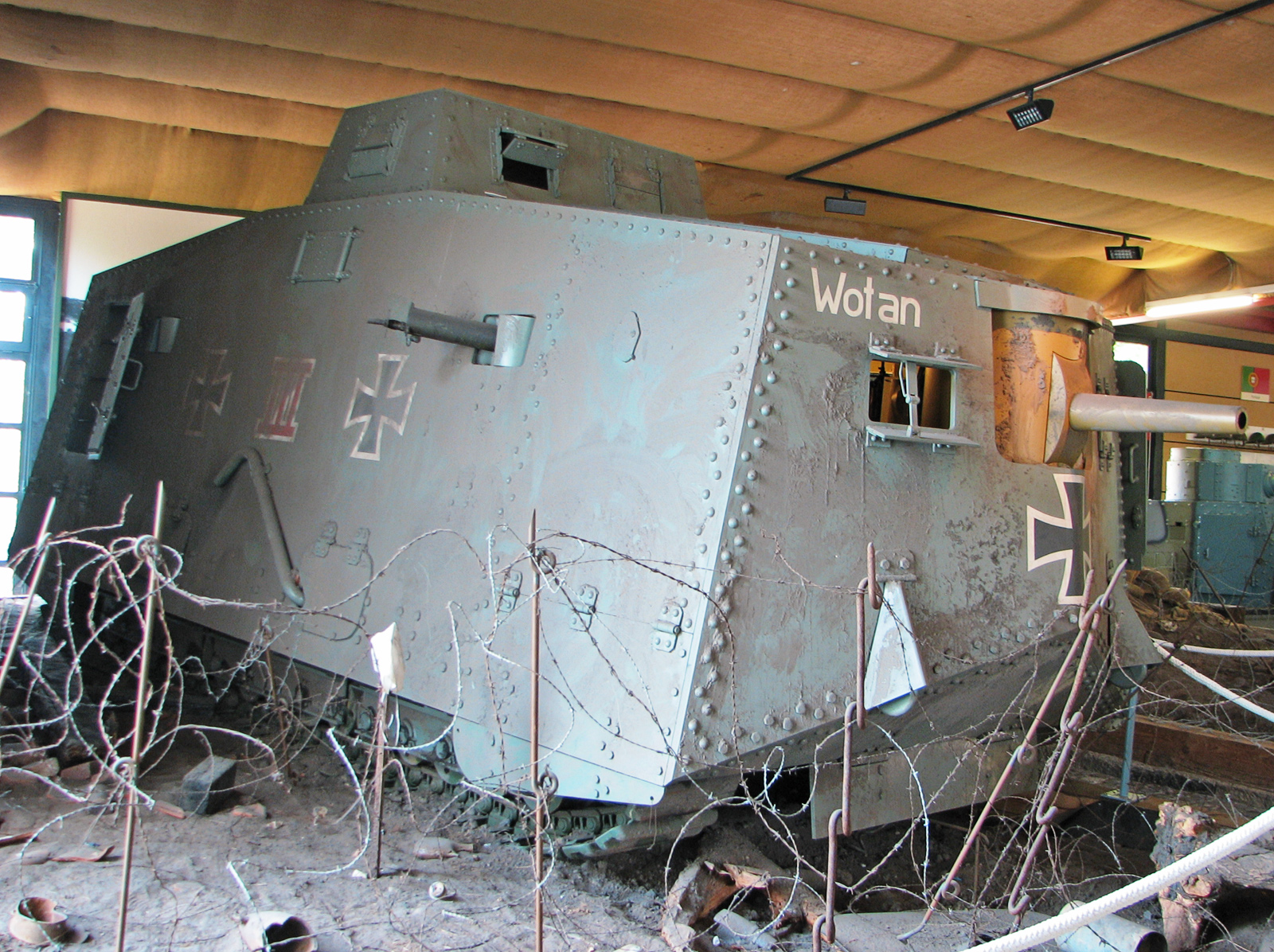
A7V Wotan (replica)

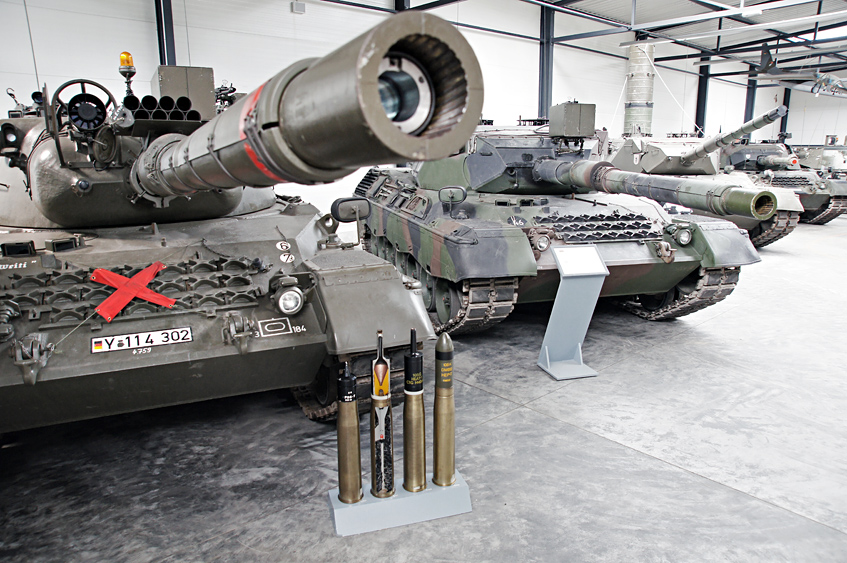
Several Leopard 1

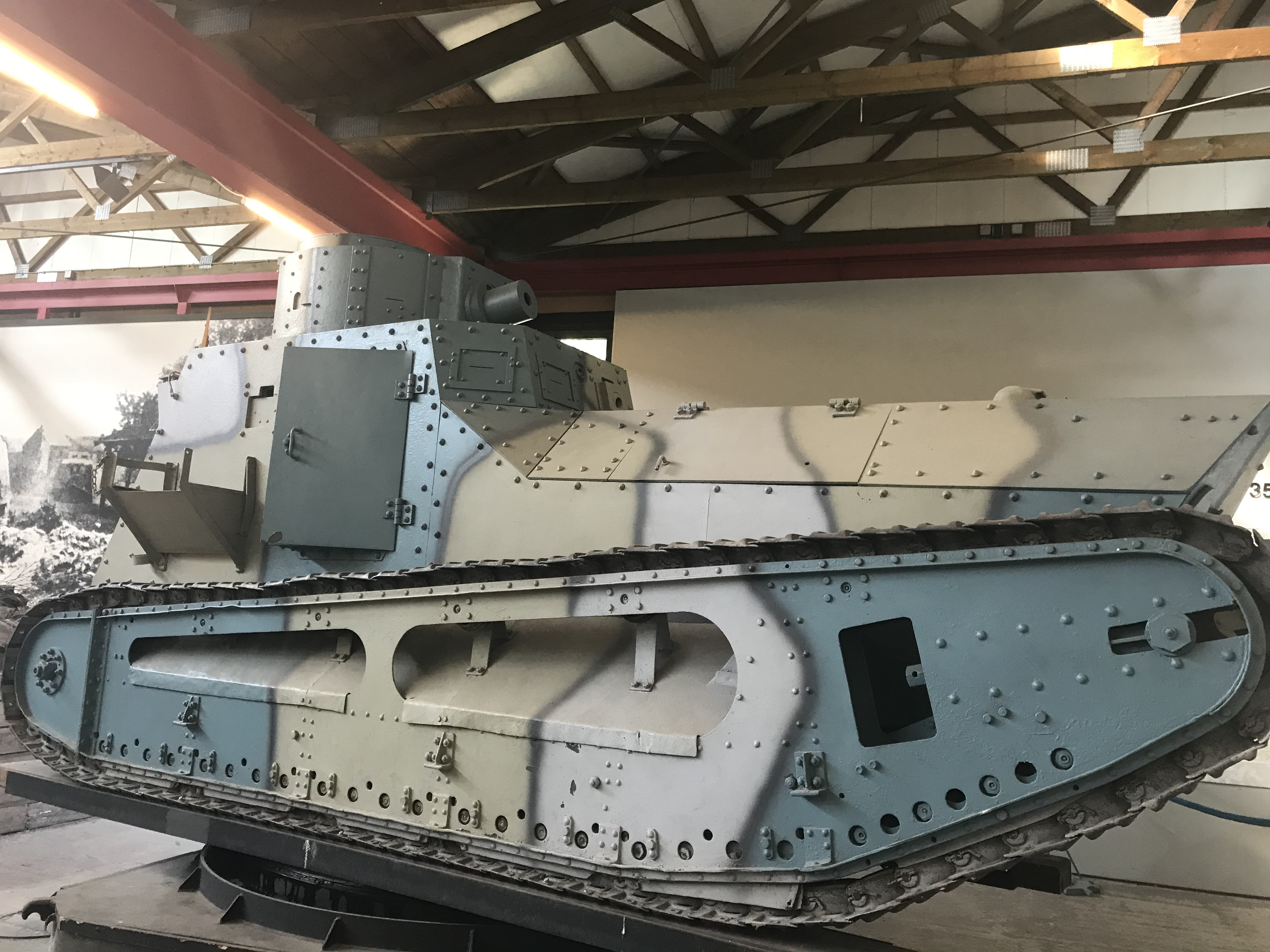
Leichter Kampfwagen II

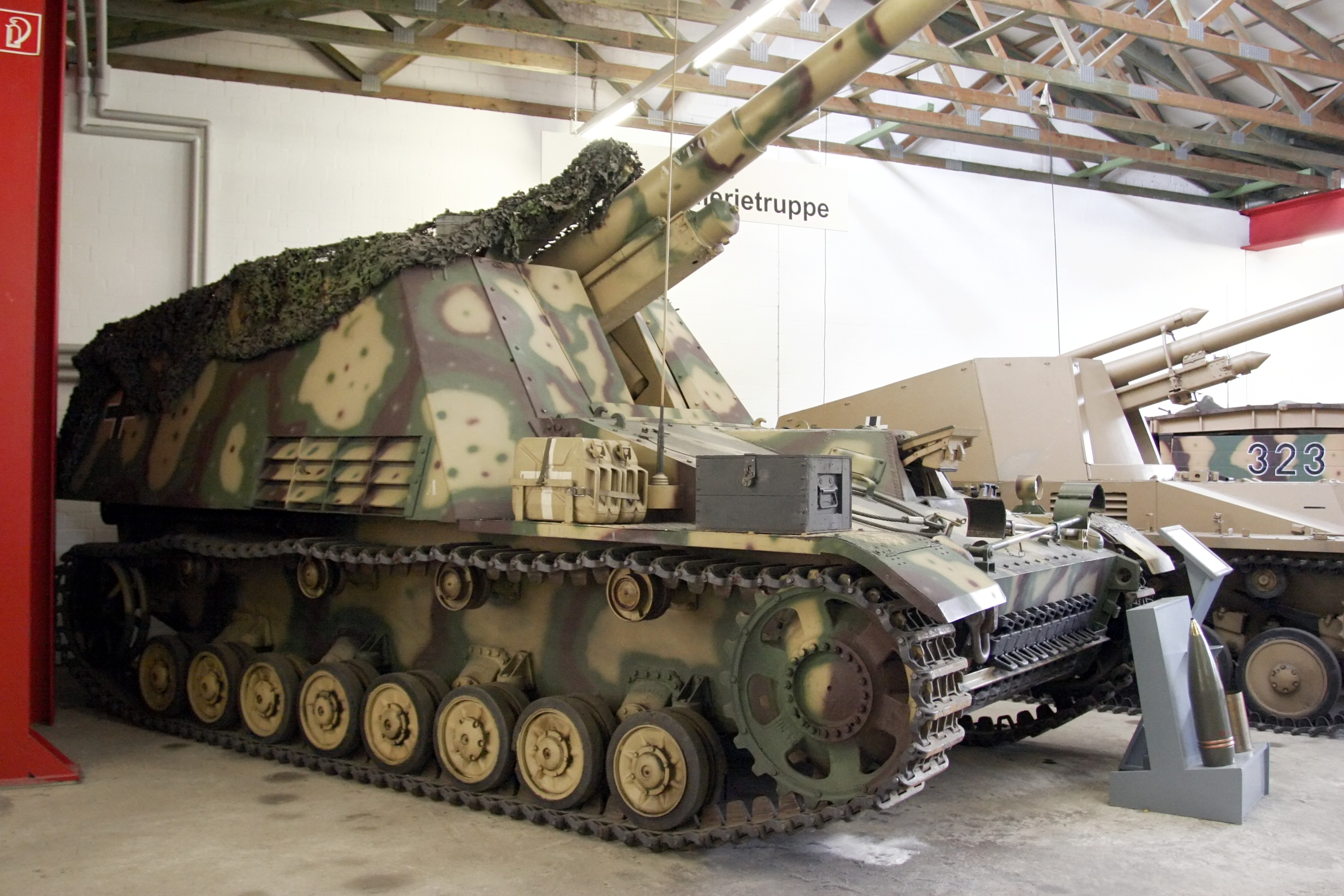
Hummel
