= Modified Accelerated Cost Recovery System =

Tax depreciation system in the United States

The Modified Accelerated Cost Recovery System (MACRS) is the current tax depreciation system in the United States. Under this system, the capitalized cost (basis) of tangible property is recovered over a specified life by annual deductions for depreciation. The lives are specified broadly in the Internal Revenue Code. The Internal Revenue Service (IRS) publishes detailed tables of lives by classes of assets. The deduction for depreciation is computed under one of two methods (declining balance switching to straight line or straight line) at the election of the taxpayer, with limitations. See IRS Publication 946 for a guide to MACRS.

== History ==
Tax deductions for depreciation have been allowed in the U.S. since the inception of the income tax. Prior to 1971, these deductions could be computed in a variety of manners over a wide range of lives. In 1971, Congress introduced the Class Life Asset Depreciation Range (ADR) system in an attempt to simplify calculations and provide some uniformity. Under ADR, the IRS prescribed lives for classes of assets based on the nature or use of the asset. Such classes included general classes (such as office equipment) and industry classes (such as assets used in the manufacture of rubber goods). Taxpayers could use their own choice of several methods of depreciating assets, including straight line, declining balance, and sum of years digits. Asset costs and accumulated depreciation were tracked by "vintage accounts" consisting of all assets within a class acquired in a particular tax year. All vintage accounts for the same year were assumed to have been placed in service in the middle of the year; however, a taxpayer could elect a modified half-year convention.

In 1981, Congress changed the depreciation system, providing generally for shorter lives for recovery of costs. Under the Accelerated Cost Recovery System (ACRS), broad groups of assets were assigned based on the old ADR lives (which the IRS has since updated). Taxpayers were permitted to calculate depreciation only under the declining balance method switching to straight line or the straight line method. Other changes applied as well.

The present MACRS system was adopted as part of the Tax Reform Act of 1986.

California is the only state which does not fully conform its depreciation schedule to MACRS.

== Depreciable lives by class ==
Under MACRS, a taxpayer must compute tax deductions for depreciation of tangible property using specified lives and methods. Assets are divided into classes by type of asset or by business in which the asset is used. (See tables of classes below.) Where a general class based on the nature of the asset applies (00.xx classes below), that class takes precedence over the use class.

For each class, three lives are specified: one for regular depreciation (GDS in the tables below), one for the alternative depreciation system (ADS), and a class life. Taxpayers may be required to use ADS or otherwise may elect which of the three lives to use. Lives for personal property vary from 3 years to 20 years. Land improvements must be depreciated over 15 or 20 years. Other real property must be depreciated over 27.5 years for residential property, 39 years for business property, and 40 years under ADS.

In addition, shorter lives are provided for certain property, including computers and peripheral equipment, certain high technology equipment, special purpose agricultural structures, and certain other items. MACRS also excluded certain property in regulated industries, as well as films, video tapes, and sound recordings, and certain other items. Also, leasehold improvements to realty are generally treated as real property under MACRS.

== Depreciation methods ==
Only the declining balance method and straight line method of computing depreciation are allowed under MACRS. Taxpayers using the declining balance change to the straight line method at the point at which depreciation deductions are optimized. (See the tables below). All tangible personal property acquired during the year is considered placed in service in the middle of the tax year ("half-year convention"). Real property is considered placed in service in the middle of the month in which acquired ("mid-month convention"). Special rules apply for pro rating deductions for short tax years and for the first year of business, or where more than 40% of tangible personal property additions are in the final quarter of the year.

The method and life used in depreciating an asset is an accounting method, change of which requires IRS approval.

Taxpayers may track the basis and accumulated depreciation of assets individually or in vintage accounts, as in the old ADR system. Where assets are tracked in vintage accounts, a first-in-first-out convention is usually applied to determine basis of assets retired.

== Special allowances and bonus depreciation ==
At various times, additional depreciation deductions have been allowed to encourage investment. These allowances generally have had limitations. For example, an additional deduction of 50% of the cost of qualifying property is allowed for certain property acquired after December 31, 2007 and before January 1, 2011 A nearly identical allowance was available for property acquired after September 10, 2001 and before 2005. The IRS recently issued guidance clarifying when taxpayers are eligible for 100 percent bonus depreciation. In addition, the guidance provides procedures for electing 100 percent bonus depreciation and 50 percent bonus depreciation for certain property. In addition to extending the availability of bonus depreciation in general, the Tax Relief Act provided for a new 100 percent depreciation deduction for qualified property that is acquired and placed into service by the taxpayer between September 8, 2010, and January 1, 2014. Special rules have also applied for bio fuel, recycling, and disaster assistance property.

Decoupling modification is a tax terminology resulting from the federal tax law enacted March 9, 2002, which created a new tax deduction for "bonus depreciation" that threatened to cost states very large amounts of revenue. Federal Bonus Depreciation, Section 168(k) of the Internal Revenue Code, allows the acceleration of depreciation on federal tax returns, for example, writing off a higher amount of depreciation for the first year an asset goes into service. States that refuse to accept this method of calculating depreciation for state taxes, for example, Iowa and Maryland, publish forms with instructions so stating.

== Alternative depreciation system ==
Certain assets must be depreciated under the Alternative Depreciation System (ADS), using specified lives and the straight line method. It may be applied at the election of the taxpayer in lieu of regular depreciation, and it must be used for the following types of property:

- Listed property used 50% or less in a qualified business use.
- Any tangible property used predominantly outside the United States during the year (subject to certain exceptions).
- Any tax-exempt use property.
- Any tax-exempt bond-financed property.
- All property used predominantly in a farming business and placed in service in any tax year during which an election not to apply the uniform capitalization rules to certain farming costs is in effect.
- Any property imported from a foreign country for which an Executive Order is in effect because the country maintains trade restrictions or engages in other discriminatory acts.

In addition, the ADS must be used for computing depreciation deductions for the Alternative Minimum Tax. ADS lives are the same as regular depreciation lives for a few classes, but are generally somewhat longer than regular lives for most classes.

== Example ==
The following example is extracted from IRS Publication 946:

You bought office furniture (7-year property) for $10,000 and placed it in service on October 13, 2013. You use the furniture only for business.

Part I
1. MACRS system (GDS or ADS)	GDS
2. Property class	7-year
3. Date placed in service	10/13/13
4. Recovery period	7-Year
5. Method and convention	200%DB/Half-Year
6. Depreciation rate (from tables)	.1429

Part II
7. Cost or other basis*	$10,000
8. Business/investment use	100%
9. Multiply line 7 by line 8	$10,000
10. Total claimed for section 179 deduction and other items	-0-
11. Subtract line 10 from line 9. This is your tentative basis for depreciation	$10,000
12. Multiply line 11 by .50 if the 50% special depreciation allowance applies. Multiply line 11 by 1.00 if the 100% special depreciation allowance applies. This is your special depreciation allowance. Enter -0- if this is not the year you placed the property in service, the property is not qualified property, or you elected not to claim a special allowance	-0-
13. Subtract line 12 from line 11. This is your basis for depreciation	$10,000
14. Depreciation rate (from line 6)	.1429
15. Multiply line 13 by line 14. This is your MACRS depreciation deduction	$1,429
*If real estate, do not include cost (basis) of land.

== Multiple-asset accounts ==
A taxpayer may group assets together into a general asset account. The grouped assets must have the same life, method of depreciation, convention, additional first year depreciation percentage, and year (or quarter or month) placed in service. Listed property or vehicles cannot be grouped with other assets. Depreciation for the account is computed as if the entire account were a single asset.

== Retirement of MACRS assets ==
Gain or loss may be deferred or recognized on retirement of assets under MACRS, at the taxpayer's election. Under default rules, proceeds from disposing of a depreciable asset in a multiple asset account are recognized as ordinary income, and depreciation on the account is unaffected by the retirement. An optional method allows the asset to be removed from the account at the start of the year from retirement, in which case gain or loss is on the asset is subject to regular rules.

== MACRS property classes table ==
From IRS Publication 946 Excerpt from Table B-1 (many asset classes omitted here)

IRS Asset Classes	Asset Description	ADS Class Life	GDS Class Life
00.11	Office furniture, fixtures, and equipment	10	7
00.12	Information systems: computers/peripherals	6	5
00.22	Automobiles, taxis	5	5
00.241	Light general-purpose trucks	4	5
00.25	Railroad cars and locomotives	15	7
00.40	Industrial steam and electric distribution	22	15
01.11	Cotton gin assets	12	7
01.21	Cattle, breeding or dairy	7	5
13.00	Offshore drilling assets	7.5	5
13.30	Petroleum refining assets	16	10
15.00	Construction assets	6	5
20.10	Manufacture of grain and grain mill products	17	10
20.20	Manufacture of yarn, thread, and woven fabric	11	7
24.10	Cutting of timber	6	5
32.20	Manufacture of cement	20	15
20.1	Manufacture of motor vehicles	12	7
48.10	Telephone distribution plant	24	15
48.2	Radio and television broadcasting equipment	6	5
49.12	Electric utility nuclear production plant	20	15
49.13	Electric utility steam production plant	28	20
49.23	Natural gas production plant	14	7
50.00	Municipal waste water treatment plant	24	15
57.0	Distributive trades, and services	9	5
80.00	Theme and amusement park assets	12.5	7

- The depreciation deduction for automobiles is limited to $7660 (maximum) the first tax year, $4900 the second, $2950 the third year, and $1775 per year in subsequent years.

== MACRS GDS property classes table ==
Type	Property Class	Description
Personal class	3-year property	Special handling devices for food and beverage manufacture. Special tools for the manufacture of finished plastic products, fabricated metal products, and motor vehicles Property with ADR class life of 4 years or less
Personal class	5-year property	Automobiles; Information Systems; Computers / Peripherals; Aircraft and parts (of non-air-transport companies); Computers; Petroleum drilling equipment Property with ADR class life of more than 4 years and less than 10 years Certain geothermal, solar, and wind energy properties.
Personal class	7-year property	All other property not assigned to another class Office furniture, fixtures, and equipment Property with ADR class life of more than 10 years and less than 16 years
Personal class	10-year property	Assets used in petroleum refining and certain food products Vessels and water transportation equipment Property with ADR class life of 16 years or more and less than 20 years
Personal class	15-year property	Telephone distribution plants Municipal sewage treatment plants Property with ADR class life of 20 years or more and less than 25 years
Personal class	20-year property	Municipal sewers Property with ADR class life of 25 years or more
Real property	27.5-year property	Residential rental property (does not include hotels and motels)
Real property	39-year property	Non-residential real property

== MACRS applicable percentage for property class ==
From IRS Publication 946 Table A-1. Other tables are available for options different from those shown below.

MACRS applicable percentage for property class
Recovery Year	3-Year	5-Year	7-Year	10-Year	15-Year	20-Year
1	33.33	20.00	14.29	10.00	5.00	3.750
2	44.45	32.00	24.49	18.00	9.50	7.219
3	14.81 *	19.20	17.49	14.40	8.55	6.677
4	7.41	11.52 *	12.49	11.52	7.70	6.177
5		11.52	8.93 *	9.22	6.93	5.713
6		5.76	8.92	7.37	6.23	5.285
7			8.93	6.55 *	5.90 *	4.888
8			4.46	6.55	5.90	4.522
9				6.56	5.91	4.462 *
10				6.55	5.90	4.461
11				3.28	5.91	4.462
12					5.90	4.461
13					5.91	4.462
14					5.90	4.461
15					5.91	4.462
16					2.95	4.461
17						4.462
18						4.461
19						4.462
20						4.461
21						2.231

- The 3-, 5-, 7-, and 10-year classes use 200% and the 15- and 20-year classes use 150% declining balance depreciation.
- All classes convert to straight-line depreciation in the optimal year, shown with an asterisk (*).
- A half-year depreciation is allowed in the first and last recovery years.
- If more than 40% of the year's MACRS property is placed in service in the last three months, then a mid-quarter convention must be used with depreciation tables that are not shown here.

== MACRS percentage for real property table ==
Recovery Year	Month 1	Month 2	Month 3	Month 4	Month 5	Month 6	Month 7	Month 8	Month 9	Month 10	Month 11	Month 12
1	2.461	2.247	2.033	1.819	1.605	1.391	1.177	0.963	0.749	0.535	0.321	0.107
2-39	2.564	2.564	2.564	2.564	2.564	2.564	2.564	2.564	2.564	2.564	2.564	2.564
40	0.107	0.321	0.535	0.749	0.963	1.177	1.391	1.605	1.819	2.033	2.247	2.461

- The useful life is 39 years for nonresidential real property. Depreciation is straight line using the mid-month convention. Thus a property placed in service in January would be allowed 11½ months depreciation for recovery Year 1.

== See also ==
- Capital Cost Allowance - Income Tax Act (R.S.C., 1985, c. 1 (5th Supp.)) regarding Canadian rules

== Sources ==
- "Publication 946 - How to Depreciate Property" (PDF). Washington, DC: Internal Revenue Service.
- IRS Rev. Proc. 87-56 and 87-55 (shown above as tables, as currently updated)
