= Mt. Morris Drive-in Theatre Co. v. Commissioner =

- Court: United States Tax Court
- Full case name: Mt. Morris Drive-in Theatre Co. v. Commissioner of Internal Revenue
- Decided: November 18, 1955
- Citation: 25 T.C. 272

Case history
- Appealed to: 6th Cir.
- Subsequent actions: Affirmed, 238 F.2d 85 (6th Cir. 1956)

Court membership
- Judges sitting: John W. Kern, Jr., Arnold Raum, Stephen E. Rice, Fisher

Case opinions
- Decision by: Kern
- Concurrence: Raum, joined by Fisher
- Dissent: Rice

Laws applied
- Internal Revenue Code

Mt. Morris Drive-in Theatre Co. v. Commissioner, 25 T.C. 272 (1955), was a case in which the court considered whether the $8,224 spent to construct a drive-in theatre's drainage system was deductible as an ordinary and necessary business expense, as a loss or if it was a non-depreciable capital expenditure. The court held that it was a capital expenditure.

== Facts ==
In 1947, petitioner purchased 13 acres (53,000 m^{2}) of farm land on the outskirts of Flint, Michigan. He built a drive-in theater on the land which was adjacent to David and Mary D. Nickola's farm land and trailer park. By removing the covering vegetation, slightly changing the land's grade and building gravel-covered ramps and aisles the petitioner caused excessive rain water to drain onto the Nickolas' property, causing damage to their crops and roadways.

After repeatedly complaining, the Nickolas filed a lawsuit against the petitioner on or about October 11, 1948, asking for an award for damages done to their property, and for an injunction forcing the petitioner to correct the drainage problem. The suit was settled on July 27, 1950. The petitioner agreed to install a mutually agreed-upon drainage system which was completed in October 1950. The project cost the petitioner $8,224.

The petitioner claimed that the entire cost of the drainage system was deductible in 1950 as an ordinary and necessary business expense incurred in the settlement of a lawsuit. In the alternative, the petitioner claimed the cost was a loss, to be deducted from claimed profits for the year.

== Opinion of the Court ==
Majority

Over the dissenting opinion of four judges, the majority found that the character of the transaction was that of a capital expenditure, and thus not deductible as an Expense.

When the Mt. Morris Drive-in Theatre Co. purchased the land in 1947, it was to convert it into a drive-in theatre. The company should have foreseen that the construction would cause drainage problems that would affect the adjacent properties. It should have included proper drainage in its original construction plan, which certainly would have been considered a Capital Expenditure for tax purposes. See Expenses versus Capital Expenditures.

Instead, under threat of litigation, the petitioner corrected the problem a year later, and sought to deduct the cost as an ordinary and necessary business expense, or a loss. Focusing on the fact that there was no sudden, unforeseeable or catastrophic factor that caused the construction, the court held that this was not an ordinary business expense or a deductible loss. Additionally, the court reasoned that until the drainage system installed, the construction of the theatre incomplete, and thus the petitioners capital investment incomplete.

Contrast this decision with Midland Empire Packing Company v. Commissioner, in which the Tax Court held that an expenditure to line basement walls with cement to prevent further oil leakage constituted a repair and was thus deductible as an ordinary and necessary business expense. Although it appears that the Tax Court set forth conflicting opinions, the two decisions are easily reconcilable. The installation of the drainage system in this case was an acquisition and construction of a new capital asset that did not previously exist. Nothing was replaced nor repaired when the drainage system was installed. On the other hand, the new basement lining in Midland Empire Packing Company v. Commissioner repaired basement walls that had been in existence for over 25 years. The repairs to the basement were necessary to continue the property’s operation for the duration of its expected life. Thus the two cases are distinguishable.

Dissent

The dissent found that the construction of drainage system was an ordinary and necessary business expense that did not increase the value of the property. Thus they found no Capital Expenditure.

Postscript

On appeal, a divided United States Court of Appeals for the Sixth Circuit affirmed the Tax Court's opinion. Judge McAllister joined the dissent reasoning that had the petitioner opted to pay damages to the neighbors, rather than completing the repair, the settlement expenses could have been deducted. He saw the construction agreement as substantially similar to a settlement for damages.
