= Grynberg v. Commissioner =

1984 United States Tax Court case

- Court: United States Tax Court
- Full case name: Jack J. Grynberg v. Commissioner of Internal Revenue
- Decided: August 27, 1984
- Citation: 83 T.C. 255 (1984)

Court membership
- Judge sitting: Stephen Swift

Case opinions
- Decision by: Swift

Laws applied
- Internal Revenue Code § 162(a)

Keywords
- Business expense

Grynberg v. Commissioner, 83 T.C. 255 (1984) was a case in which the United States Tax Court held that one taxpayer's prepaid business expenses were not ordinary and necessary expenses of the years in which they were made, and therefore the prepayments were not tax deductible. Taxpayers in the United States often seek to maximize their income and decrease their tax liability by prepaying deductible expenses and taking a deduction earlier rather than in a later tax year.

== The Time Value of Money, or "Why Timing Matters" ==
Prepayment of expenses sometimes allows a taxpayer to take a deduction in an earlier tax year than would otherwise occur. This can have two benefits. First, taking a deduction earlier allows the possibility of earning interest on the money during the time that the money would otherwise have been paid for taxes. See also: The Time Value of Money. Over the long term, using large enough numbers, the benefit might be worthwhile.

Second, there could be a benefit to prepaying expenses if the taxpayer expects to be in a lower tax bracket in the next taxable year. It is more worthwhile for a taxpayer to reduce his taxable income in a year when the income will be taxed at a higher bracket.

== Facts of Grynberg ==
During the years 1974 through 1979, taxpayers prepaid certain business expenses each December that were not due until February and March of the following year. Taxpayers used the Cash Method of accounting for Federal income tax purposes. Under that method, taxpayers deducted the prepaid expenses paid in December when they were paid, rather than in February or March when they would otherwise be due.

== The Parties' Contentions ==
Taxpayers contended that their prepayments were deductible business expenses under § 162 of the Internal Revenue Code. Section 162 allows taxpayers to deduct ordinary and necessary expenses "paid or incurred" in carrying on a trade or business.

In return, the IRS argued that taxpayers violated IRC § 446(b), which requires that a taxpayer's method of accounting must "clearly reflect income." In addition, the IRS argued that the prepayments were voluntary, nondeductible advance deposits, and that they do not qualify as ordinary and necessary business expenses.

== The Test ==
To determine if the prepayments were deductible, the Tax Court applied a three-prong test. The test applies whenever the issue is the deductibility of prepaid items under §§ 162 and 446(b). Each prong is independent and must be satisfied for a prepayment to be deductible:

First, there must be an "actual payment of the item in question." A mere refundable deposit will not support a deduction.

Second, there must be a "substantial business reason" for making the prepayment early. If prepayment occurred simply to accelerate a tax deduction, no deduction will be allowed in the year of prepayment. Tax reduction is not considered a "valid business purpose," and thus is not an ordinary and necessary expense under § 162. Grynberg at

Third, prepayment of the item must not cause a "material distortion" in the taxpayer's taxable income in the year of prepayment. IRC § 446(b). The taxpayer carries a heavy burden to overcome the IRS's determination that the taxpayer's method of accounting does not clearly reflect income.

== Application of the Test ==
Applying the test above, the Grynberg court concluded that the prepayments satisfied the first prong. The prepayments were not mere deposits but irretrievable payments. However, the court found no valid business reason for making the payments in December rather than the following February or March when the payments were actually due. Because taxpayers failed the second prong of the test, the court did not apply the third requirement to the facts of the case. Because the prepayments were not necessary and ordinary business expenses for the year in which they were paid, the prepayments were not deductible.

== A Split in the Courts ==
Grynberg illustrates only one of two tests that courts apply to determine if a current deduction is proper when a business prepays certain expenses. The Ninth Circuit Court of Appeals applied a different test in Zaninovich v. Commissioner, 616 F.2d 429 (9th Cir. 1980). Thus, cases that are appealable to the Ninth Circuit apply the Zaninovich approach, and not the Grynberg approach
