= Vitale v. Commissioner =

- Court: United States Tax Court
- Full case name: Ralph Louis Vitale, Jr. v. Commissioner of Internal Revenue
- Decided: August 12, 1999
- Citation: T.C. Memo 1999-131; 77 T.C.M. 1869

Court membership
- Judge sitting: William M. Fay

Case opinions
- Decision by: Fay

Laws applied
- Internal Revenue Code § 162(a)

Keywords
- Business expense

Vitale v. Commissioner, T.C. Memo 1999-131 (1999) is a case that demonstrates a policy limit on the deduction of business expenses.

== Facts ==
The taxpayer began visiting legal brothels in order to develop characters for a book called "Searchlight, Nevada." He kept detailed entries of his experience with prostitutes and brothels including "the matter in which he selected her, the house rules of the brothel, the manner in which he negotiated a price for her time, their dialogue, and the type of clothing worn by her." The taxpayer also spent time promoting his book and working on its publication.

== Section 162(a) ==
Section 162(a) of the Internal Revenue Code (I.R.C.) allows deductions for all the "ordinary and necessary expenses paid or incurred during the taxable year in carrying on any trade or business..."

== Issue ==
Does section 162(a) allow for the deduction of the expenses to the taxpayer in visiting brothels in order to research his upcoming novel?

== Ruling ==
Despite falling under the plain meaning of section 162(a), the taxpayer's expenses were not deductible. The court found a public policy exception to the statute. The court found that "expenditures incurred by petitioner to visit prostitutes are so personal in nature as to preclude their deductibility."

== Policy-Based Statutory Limits on the Deduction of Business Expenses ==
The I.R.C. contains a number of policy exceptions on deductions for business expenses:

- Section 162(c) disallows a deduction for illegal payments to government officials or employee, kickbacks, bribes, etc.
- Section 162(e) disallows a deduction for expenses incurred in lobbying and political activities.
- Section 162(f) disallows deductions for fines and penalties paid in violation of the law.
- Section 280E disallows deductions for any amount incurred in a trade or business if such trade or business consists of trafficking controlled substances.
