= Jenkins v. Commissioner =

American legal case

- Court: United States Tax Court
- Full case name: Harold L. Jenkins and Temple M. Jenkins v. Commissioner of Internal Revenue
- Decided: November 3, 1983
- Citations: T.C. Memo 1983-667; 47 T.C.M. (CCH) 238 (1983)

Court membership
- Judge sitting: Irwin

Case opinions
- Decision by: Irwin

Laws applied
- Internal Revenue Code § 162(a)

Keywords
- Business expense

In Jenkins v. Commissioner, T.C. Memo 1983-667 (U.S. Tax Court Memos 1983), the U.S. Tax Court held that the payments Conway Twitty, a country singer, made to investors in a defunct restaurant business known as "Twitty Burger, Inc." were deductible under § 162 of the Internal Revenue Code as ordinary and necessary business expenses of petitioner's business as a country music performer.

== Facts ==
The petitioner, Harold L. Jenkins, was a well-known country music singer who was commonly known by his stage name of "Conway Twitty". Conway had been a musical performer since the 1950s, but it was not until the late 1960s that Conway became well-established in the country music industry. By mid-1970, Conway Twitty had 43 Number 1 hit records.

In 1968, Twitty Burger, Inc. was formed by Conway, along with approximately 75 friends and business associates who invested money in Twitty Burger for the operation of Twitty Burger Fast Food Restaurants. Late in 1970, Twitty Burger began to encounter financial difficulties and nearly every Twitty Burger restaurant was closed by 1971. Although he had no assets with which to pay the debentures, Conway decided to repay the investors the amount of their investments with future earnings. On his 1973 and 1974 Federal income tax returns, Conway deducted these total amounts, $92,892.46 and $3,600, respectively, as ordinary and necessary business expenses under § 162.

== Issue ==
Were the payments made by Conway Twitty to investors in the failed corporation known as Twitty Burger, Inc., deductible as ordinary and necessary business expenses of Conway's business as a country music performer?

== Holding ==
The Court held that the payments to the investor by Conway Twitty were deductible as ordinary and necessary business expenses of his business as a country music performer. Lohrke v. Commissioner, 48 T.C. 679 (1967), a landmark Tax Court case, established a two-part test to determine whether a payment is deductible as ordinary and necessary.

The court applied the Lohrke test to the instant case as follows. To determine whether the payments were deductible under § 162, the United States Tax Court was required to

1. ascertain the purpose or motive of the taxpayer in making the payments and
2. determine whether there was a sufficient connection between the expenditures and the taxpayer's trade or business.

After a lengthy explanation of how vital personal reputation is to a member of the country music industry, the Court found that Conway's motive in repaying the investors was to protect his personal business reputation. Direct quotes from Conway himself, and from a number of country music historians, were presented in this case to explain how the success of country musicians is extremely dependent on their images. After determining Conway's motive, the Court went on to find a proximate relationship between payments made to the investors and Conway's trade or business as a country music entertainer. Having determined the motive and the connection between the expenditures and the trade or business, Conway's payments to the Twitty Burger investors were held to be ordinary and necessary business expenses of a country music performer.

== Real World Interest ==
Aside from providing an analysis to use in determining whether certain payments constitute ordinary and necessary business expenses under § 162, this case provides a fascinating, if brief, history of the country music industry and the unique relationship between country musicians and country music fans.

But, the case is probably best known for the rare exchange of public humor it elicited between two government entities. The Tax Court closed its opinion with the following footnote:

"Ode to Conway Twitty"

Twitty Burger went belly up
But Conway remained true
He repaid his investors, one and all
It was the moral thing to do.
His fans would not have liked it
It could have hurt his fame
Had any investors sued him
Like Merle Haggard or Sonny James.
When it was time to file taxes
Conway thought what he would do
Was deduct those payments as a business expense
Under section one-sixty-two.
In order to allow these deductions
Goes the argument of the Commissioner
The payments must be ordinary and necessary
To a business of the petitioner.
Had Conway not repaid the investors
His career would have been under cloud,
Under the unique facts of this case
Held: The deductions are allowed.

In Action on Decision 1984-022, the Internal Revenue Service announced whether it would appeal the decision as follows:

Our reaction to the Court's opinion is reflected in the following "Ode to Conway Twitty: A Reprise":

Harold Jenkins and Conway Twitty
They are both the same
But one was born
The other achieved fame.
The man is talented
And has many a friend
They opened a restaurant
His name he did lend.
They are two different things
Making burgers and song
The business went sour
It didn't take long.
He repaid his friends
Why did he act
Was it business or friendship
Which is fact?
Business the court held
It's deductible they feel
We disagree with the answer
But, let's not appeal.

RECOMMENDATION Nonacquiescence

DAVID C. FEGAN Attorney

JOEL GERBER Acting Chief Counsel

By: CLIFFORD M. HARBOURT Senior Technician Reviewer Branch No. 2

Tax Litigation Division
