= Reverse Morris Trust =

Type of US financial transaction

A Reverse Morris Trust is the term for a type of financial transaction in United States law that combines a divisive reorganization (spin-off) with an acquisitive reorganization (statutory merger) to allow a tax-free transfer (in the guise of a merger) of a subsidiary. It may be especially useful when one publicly-traded C-corporation wants to sell an asset of at least $1 billion to another publicly traded C-corporation.

== Structure ==
A Reverse Morris Trust is used when a parent company has a subsidiary (sub-company) that it wants to sell in a tax-efficient manner. The parent company completes a spin-off of a subsidiary to the parent company's shareholders. Under Internal Revenue Code section 355, this could be tax-free if certain criteria are met. The former subsidiary (now owned by the parent company's shareholders, but separate from the parent company) then merges with a target company to create a merged company. Under Internal Revenue Code section 368(a)(1)(A), this transaction could be largely tax-free if the former subsidiary is considered the "buyer" of the target company. The former subsidiary is the "buyer" if its shareholders (also the original parent company's shareholders) own more than 50% of the merged company.

== History ==
The original Morris Trust structure was the result of a favorable ruling by the United States Court of Appeals for the Fourth Circuit in 1966 in the case of Commissioner v. Mary Archer W. Morris Trust. The original Morris Trust structure is similar to the above Reverse Morris Trust structure. Instead of a former subsidiary merging with a target company, however, the parent company would merge with the target company.

Following several leveraged Morris Trust transactions similar to the original Morris Trust transaction, but involving cash and bank loans rather than mere stock, Congress enacted Internal Revenue Code Section 355(e) in 1997. This provision imposes additional taxation on the distribution in the spin-off step whenever a 50% interest in a spun off company or the parent company is sold in the two years following a spin-off.

== Examples ==
Verizon wished to sell its access lines to FairPoint Communications. Rather than simply selling these assets to FairPoint, Verizon created a subsidiary to which it sold these assets. Verizon distributed the shares of this new subsidiary to Verizon's shareholders. The parties then completed a Reverse Morris Trust with FairPoint, where the original Verizon shareholders had a majority ownership of the newly merged company and the FairPoint management ran the new company. Verizon was able to divest their access lines in a tax-free manner.

Lockheed Martin divested a portion of its Information Systems & Global Solutions (IS&GS) business to Leidos in a $5 billion transaction in early 2016. The transaction included a $1.8 billion one-time special cash payment to Lockheed Martin. Lockheed Martin shareholders received 50.5% equity in Leidos.

On February 2, 2017, Entercom announced that it had agreed to acquire CBS Radio. The sale was conducted using a Reverse Morris Trust so that it was tax-free.

On April 1, 2017, Hewlett Packard Enterprise's enterprise service division acquired CSC to form the new company called DXC Technology.

On February 25, 2019, General Electric completed the transfer of its transportation products division to Wabtec, receiving a distribution of Wabtec shares and $2.9 billion cash.

On May 17, 2021, AT&T announced that it was spinning off its content subsidiary WarnerMedia and merging it with Discovery, Inc. to form a new company, Warner Bros. Discovery, subject to regulatory approval. The deal, which closed in April 2022, was structured as a Reverse Morris Trust; at the time the deal was completed, AT&T's shareholders held a 71% stake in the combined company and appointed seven board members, while Discovery, Inc. held the remaining 29% and appointed six board members.

=== Procter and Gamble ===
Procter & Gamble was planning to sell its Pringles line of snacks to Diamond Foods in a leveraged, reverse Morris Trust split-off. The Pringles business was to be transferred to a separate subsidiary which would assume approximately $850 million of debt. The two companies were unable to finalize the deal and, in February 2012, Procter & Gamble found another buyer in Kellogg's.

Procter & Gamble used a similar transaction structure when it sold Folgers coffee to The J.M. Smucker Company in 2008 and used the same transaction structure with the sale of 43 of its beauty brands on July 9, 2015, to Coty.
