= Public policy limitation on deduction for business expenses =

Corporate exemption under the US tax system

Under the United States taxation system, an enterprise may deduct business expenses from its taxable income, subject to certain conditions. On occasion the Internal Revenue Service (IRS) has challenged such deductions, regarding the activities in question as illegitimate, and in certain circumstances the Internal Revenue Code provides for such challenge. Rulings by the U.S. Supreme Court have in general upheld the deductions, where there is not a specific governmental policy in support of disallowing them.

== Deduction for business expenses ==
Section 162(a) of the Internal Revenue Code allows for taxpayers to deduct from their gross income ordinary and necessary expenses paid or incurred in carrying on a trade or business. Taxpayers seeking to minimize the size of their gross income for tax purposes have a strong incentive to deduct as much as possible from their pre-tax income. Thus, taxpayers will attempt to classify their activity as trade or business to take advantage of the deduction.

To deduct an expense under § 162(a) the item must meet six separate elements:

1. The expense must be ordinary
2. The expense must be necessary
3. It must be an expense as opposed to a capital expenditure
4. The expense has to be paid or incurred during the taxable year
5. The expense has to be in carrying on the activity
6. The activity has to be a trade or business activity the part for

When these criteria are met, the taxpayer will typically be successful in claiming a deduction. However, taxpayers may still face challenges to their claimed deductions if allowing a deduction is considered by the IRS or tax courts as invalid as against public policy.

== IRS claims for public policy exception ==
Taxpayers who engage in illegitimate or illegal business activities and claim § 162 deductions for expenses paid or incurred in carrying on those activities create problems for policymakers seeking to prevent the formation of such business activity. Section 162 of the Code does not include any provision concerning the legality of the trade or business activity in question. Thus, to contest the allowance of deductions in such situations, the IRS has raised arguments based on public policy.

In a series of decisions, the Supreme Court held that there is no public policy exception to § 162 deductions at common law. Without clear guidance from Congress as to the relevance of the legality of a business activity in the expense deduction determination, expenditures of a taxpayer that otherwise meet the requirements of § 162 will be allowed as deductions.

== Supreme Court rulings ==
=== The Tellier case ===
In Commissioner v. Tellier, the taxpayer claimed deductions for legal expenses incurred in an unsuccessful defense against criminal prosecution related to his trade or business. The taxpayer, Tellier, was in the securities business, "underwriting the public sale of stock offerings and purchasing securities for resale to customers." In 1956, Tellier was convicted of violating the fraud section of the Securities Act of 1933, the mail fraud statute, and conspiracy to violate those statutes. After the trial, Tellier claimed a deduction for his unsuccessful legal expenses. The IRS argued that a deduction for expenses incurred in an unsuccessful defense against a charge of criminal behavior should not be allowed because to do so would presumably grant a windfall to the guilty defendant.

The Court, however, made clear that it would review deduction determinations in light of the principle that the "federal income tax is a tax on net income, not a sanction against wrongdoing." According to the Court, absent "a few limited and well-defined exceptions" (see below) § 162 does not limit deductions for losses to those losses incurred in a legitimate trade or business.

The rationale for this conclusion was the 1913 Senate debate on the first federal income tax bill. According to the Congressional Record, amendments that would have limited deductions for losses to only those incurred in a legitimate or lawful trade or business were expressly rejected by the Senate. Senator John Williams, the orchestrator of the income tax bill, stated, "the object of this bill is to tax a man's net income…the law does not care where he got it from, so far as the tax is concerned…"

The Court upheld the deduction, holding that no public policy was offended. Without any direction from Congress to limit the losses stemming from an illegitimate business, the Court was unwilling to attach what it viewed as an additional financial burden (disallowance) to the punishment imposed by the finding of criminal guilt.

=== The Sullivan and Lilly cases ===
The Court used similar reasoning in earlier cases concerning deductions claimed for expenses arising out of illegal or illegitimate business activity. In United States v. Sullivan, the taxpayer claimed a deduction for rent and wages paid in support of a gambling enterprise. The enterprise and the rent and wages paid were illegal under state law. The IRS challenged the claimed deduction, stating that the illegality of the gambling enterprise required disallowance of the deduction. The Supreme Court upheld the deduction, holding that "to enforce as federal policy the rule espoused by the Commissioner [IRS] in this case, we would come close to making this type of business taxable on the basis of its gross receipts…If that choice is to be made, Congress should do it."

In Lilly v. Commissioner, opticians claimed deductions for payments made to doctors in consideration of prescriptions for eyeglasses sold by the optician taxpayers in question. Though these payments qualified for § 162 deduction as expenses paid in the course of the opticians' trade or business, the IRS argued that the expenses should be disallowed as against public policy. While the Court disapproved of the business ethics displayed by the opticians, the Court upheld the deductions as valid under the Code.

=== Tank Truck Rentals ===
The Court in Tellier stated that only in extremely limited circumstances would a deduction that meets the requirements of § 162 be disallowed where Congress is silent. Specifically, the Court decided that a deduction that otherwise meets the requirements of § 162 will be disallowed where allowance would "frustrate sharply defined national or state policies proscribing particular types of conduct… evidenced by some governmental declaration".

The state policy at issue in Tank Truck Rentals v. Commissioner provides an example of the type of policy evidenced by some governmental declaration that would limit deduction. In Tank Truck Rentals, the taxpayer trucking company claimed deductions for fines and penalties it received for violating state maximum weight penal statutes. The Court ruled that allowing deductions "would have directly and substantially diluted the actual punishment imposed." Further, the Court stated that allowing such a deduction would encourage non-compliance with a defined state regulation.

== Statutory limits on business expense deductions ==
Even though there is no public policy exception to the deduction of business expenses, the Code itself imposes some public policy based exceptions. For example, § 162(c)(1) disallows a deduction for illegal bribes or kickbacks to a domestic government official or agency, and § 162(f) disallows a deduction for fines paid to the government for violating the law. Furthermore, § 280E prevents a taxpayer from taking a deduction related to the business of selling illegal controlled substances. So while the Tellier court ruling states that the federal tax is not meant to be a sanction for wrongdoing, there are often public policy prohibitions embedded in the Code itself.
