= Estate of Rockefeller v. Commissioner =

- Court: United States Court of Appeals for the Second Circuit
- Full case name: Estate of Nelson A. Rockefeller, Deceased, Laurance S. Rockefeller, J. Richardson Dilworth and Donal C. O'Brien, Jr., Executors and Margaretta F. Rockefeller v. Commissioner of Internal Revenue
- Argued: April 22, 1985
- Decided: May 24, 1985
- Citations: 762 F.2d 264; 56 A.F.T.R.2d 85-5094; 53 USLW 2620; 85-1 USTC (CCH) ¶ 9429

Case history
- Prior history: 83 T.C. 368 (1984)

Court membership
- Judges sitting: Wilfred Feinberg, Henry Friendly, Jon O. Newman

Case opinions
- Majority: Friendly, joined by Feinberg, Newman

Laws applied
- Internal Revenue Code § 162(a)

Keywords
- Business expense

Estate of Rockefeller v. Commissioner, 762 F.2d 264 (2d Cir. 1985), was a case in which the United States Court of Appeals for the Second Circuit held that section 162(a) of the Internal Revenue Code only allows deductions against income for expenses that occur while carrying on a trade or business.

== Facts of the case ==
Nelson Rockefeller had incurred $550,159.78 worth of legal fees and services with regard to his 1974 vice presidential confirmation hearings. Mr. Rockefeller then claimed a $63,275 deduction on his 1974 income tax return, which was the amount of his salary as vice-president.

== Determination of the court ==
The 2nd Circuit affirmed the Tax Courts ruling that the deductions were not allowed under IRC section 162. The Court essentially compared Rockefeller's past job as Governor of New York with his position as Vice President and found that the two positions did not constitute the same trade or business. Mr. Rockefeller's estate argued that his trade or business was that of public service, but there was no authority that supported such a broad interpretation. Thus, the legal and consulting fees were not incurred in carrying out a trade or business, but in anticipation of doing so. Essentially, the court ruled that the expenses could not be deducted because Rockefeller was not yet "carrying on" the business of being Vice President.
