= Lohrke v. Commissioner =

Tax law legal case in the United States

- Court: United States Tax Court
- Full case name: James L. Lohrke and June M. Lohrke v. Commissioner of Internal Revenue
- Decided: August 10, 1967
- Citation: 48 T.C. 679

Court membership
- Judge sitting: Charles R. Simpson

Case opinions
- Decision by: Simpson

Laws applied
- Internal Revenue Code

Keywords
- Business expense

Lohrke v. Commissioner, 48 T.C. 679 (1967), is a significant case cited for its opinion which further articulated a much-litigated phrase "ordinary and necessary" business expense in the Tax Code, 26 U.S.C.S. § 162(a). Although it has been distinguished in nine cases, it has been followed by thirteen cases and cited in various treatises. In Lohrke, the Tax Court determined that when the taxpayer paid for expenses that he was not actually obligated to pay, he could still deduct them as an "ordinary and necessary" business expense under 26 U.S.C.S. § 162(a) of the Tax Code.

== Facts ==
In Lohrke, the petitioner was a licensor and inventor as well as President for Lohrke Textiles, Inc. (Textiles). Although petitioner and Textiles are separate taxable entities, petitioner paid for the damages caused by a defective shipment of fiber for which he owned the patent which created it. Petitioner felt that to protect his business it was both "ordinary and necessary" to reimburse the customers to save his business reputation. The respondent argued that because petitioner was not obligated to pay, this payment did not fall under the definition of an "ordinary and necessary" business expense found in 26 U.S.C.S. § 162(a) and should consequently not be deductible.

== Decision ==
The Court determined that the expenditure was primarily "for the furtherance or promotion of that trade or business" and thus qualified as an ordinary and necessary business expense under U.S.C.S. § 162(a) of the Tax Code. This is significant because there is a general rule that one taxpayer cannot deduct expenses that are the obligation of another.
