= Internal Revenue Code section 183 =

Hobby Loss rule of United States Internal Revenue Code

Section 183 of the United States Internal Revenue Code (26 U.S.C. § 183), sometimes referred to as the "hobby loss rule," limits the losses that can be deducted from income which are attributable to hobbies and other not-for-profit activities. Generally, losses which occur in for-profit activities are not limited and can be used to offset other income from other activities. But the § 183 limitation curtails those deductions when the activity is deemed a hobby.

== Application ==
The hobby loss rule breaks down into four requirements: not engaged in for profit, deductions otherwise allowable, sections 162 and 212 would have applied, but only up to the corresponding gains.

=== Not engaged in "for profit" ===
Section 183(c) defines an "activity not engaged in for profit" to be any activity other than those that would have expenses allowed as a "trade or business" (§ 162) or an "investment" (§ 212).

There is a presumption that the activity is "for profit" created in § 183(d) by the "three out of five year" rule. Gross income from the activity must exceed deductions from the activity in three out of the previous five years. If it does then the activity is likely presumed to be an activity engaged in for profit. The taxpayer must show a "primary, predominant, or principal purpose" of creating a profit. This topic is further explored in the 26 Code of Federal Regulations § 1.183-2

=== Deductions otherwise allowable ===
Some deductions, such as those in § 164 that allow for the deduction of certain taxes, are allowable without regard to whether the activity is engaged in for profit. These are not limited.

=== Section 162 and 212 would have applied ===
On the other hand, those expenses that would be allowable if were a trade or business or an investment are still allowable as a deduction here, except that they are limited as explained below.

=== Deductions may not exceed the amount of corresponding gross income ===
Section 183(b)(2) provides that a taxpayer may deduct an amount "equal to the amount of the deductions which would be allowable [ . . . ] only if such activity were engaged in for profit, but only to the extent that the gross income derived from such activity for the taxable year exceeds the deductions allowable [ . . . ]." This provision limits the deduction for expenses from hobby activities to amount equal to the gross income generated by the same activities.

This means, for example, that a knitter who does not qualify to call knitting a "trade or business," can deduct only the expenses of the hobby up to the amount gained by the hobby. The cost of yarn and other expenses as well as depreciation on a knitting machine may be deducted against the sale price of the scarf sold, but not against the unrelated income the knitter makes at a day job.

=== Practical considerations ===
For a business (activity engaged in for profit), income and expenses are listed on Schedule C (and the net income result carries to line 12 of the Form 1040). All expenses are used, even if they create a net loss. For a hobby (an activity not engaged in for profit), income and expenses are listed separately. The income is included on line 21 of the Form 1040 (Other income). Therefore, the hobbyist is required to file the long form, Form 1040 (as the other Forms 1040A and 1040EZ have no lines to include "other income"). However, the expenses are listed on line 23 of the Schedule A (Other expenses). This leads to a couple of hidden consequences. Firstly, the taxpayer must add these expenses to his other job expenses (as well as investment expenses and tax preparation costs) and reduce the sum by 2% of the Adjusted Gross Income (AGI). Only the portion that exceeds 2% of the AGI is deductible. Secondly, the taxpayer must itemize his deductions on the Schedule A, or the hobby expenses are not deductible at all. If the taxpayer is already itemizing deductions, with adequate job or investment expenses, then the hobby expenses will be fully deductible.
