= INDOPCO, Inc. v. Commissioner =

- Supreme Court of the United States

Argued November 12, 1991 Decided February 26, 1992
- Full case name: INDOPCO, Inc. v. Commissioner of Internal Revenue
- Citations: 503 U.S. 79 (more) 112 S. Ct. 1039; 117 L. Ed. 2d 226; 1992 U.S. LEXIS 1374

Case history
- Prior: Nat'l Starch & Chem. Corp. v. Comm'r, 93 T.C. 67 (1989), affirmed, 918 F.2d 426 (3d Cir. 1990), cert. granted, 500 U.S. 914 (1991).

Holding
- Expenditures incurred by a target corporation in the course of a friendly takeover are nondeductible capital expenditures.

Court membership
- Chief Justice William Rehnquist Associate Justices Byron White · Harry Blackmun; John P. Stevens · Sandra Day O'Connor; Antonin Scalia · Anthony Kennedy; David Souter · Clarence Thomas

Case opinion
- Majority: Blackmun, joined by unanimous

Laws applied
- Internal Revenue Code § 162(a)

INDOPCO, Inc. v. Commissioner, 503 U.S. 79 (1992), was a United States Supreme Court case in which the Court held that expenditures incurred by a target corporation in the course of a friendly takeover are nondeductible capital expenditures.

== Question presented ==
Are certain professional expenses incurred by a target corporation in the course of a friendly takeover deductible by that corporation as "ordinary and necessary" business expenses under § 162(a) of the Internal Revenue Code?

== Key facts ==
In 1977, Unilever (a Delaware corporation) expressed interest in acquiring INDOPCO (formerly named National Starch and Chemical Corporation). In order to adequately prepare for being bought out, National Starch hired Morgan Stanley to be its investment banker on this transaction. The fees charged by Morgan Stanley amounted to $2,200,000, in addition to $7,586 for out-of-pocket expenses and $18,000 in legal fees. National Starch tried to claim all of these fees as deductions. The Commissioner of the Internal Revenue Service disallowed the claimed deduction. The Tax Court and the Court of Appeals for the Third Circuit affirmed the Commissioner’s decision. The courts held that the amount spent towards Morgan Stanley added to the long-term betterment of National Starch.

== Opinion of the Court ==
In a unanimous opinion delivered by Justice Blackmun, the Court held that expenses incurred in a friendly takeover do not qualify for tax deduction as “ordinary and necessary” expenses under § 162(a).

The key here is that National Starch did not demonstrate that the investment banking, legal, and other costs it incurred in connection with Unilever’s acquisition of its shares are deductible as ordinary and necessary business expenses under §162(a). In addition to the analysis provided by the two previous courts, the Supreme Court cited the fact that there is a long history of finding that the purpose of changing the corporate structure for the benefit of future operations is not an ordinary and necessary business expense. General Bancshares Corp. v. Commissioner, 326. F.2d, at 715.

== INDOPCO Treasury Regulations ==
Treasury Regulation 1.263(a)-4(b) requires the taxpayer to capitalize listed intangible assets.

Specifically, the taxpayer must capitalize

1. Amounts paid to acquire or create intangible assets.
2. Amounts paid to create or enhance separate and distinct intangible assets – i.e. property interests with ascertainable value protected under state, federal, and foreign law, that are capable of being sold, transferred, or pledged, and are separate from a trade or business. Amounts to create computer software or package design are not included.
3. Amounts paid to create or enhance future benefits identified as intangibles requiring capitalization under the Federal Register or Internal Revenue Bulletin.
4. Amounts facilitating the acquisition or creation of intangible assets.

To simplify application, Treasury Regulation 1.263-4(f)(1) enacts a “12-month rule” allowing the taxpayer a current deduction for amounts paid to create rights or benefits that last beyond one year of the taxpayer realizing the right or benefit if that benefit doesn’t last beyond the taxable year following the tax year the initial payment is made.

== See also ==
- List of United States Supreme Court cases, volume 503
- List of United States Supreme Court cases
- Lists of United States Supreme Court cases by volume
- List of United States Supreme Court cases by the Rehnquist Court
