= Pevsner v. Commissioner =

Fifth Circuit Court of Appeals case regarding taxation

- Court: United States Court of Appeals for the Fifth Circuit
- Full case name: Barry D. and Sandra J. Pevsner v. Commissioner of Internal Revenue
- Decided: October 20 1980
- Citations: 628 F.2d 467 (5th Cir. 1980); 80-2 USTC (CCH) ¶ 9732

Holding
- An "objective" (reasonableness) test is used to determine whether clothes worn at work were adaptable to general usage and therefore not deductible.

Court membership
- Judges sitting: Robert A. Ainsworth Jr., Reynaldo Guerra Garza, Samuel D. Johnson Jr.

Case opinions
- Majority: Johnson, joined by Ainsworth, Garza

Laws applied
- Internal Revenue Code Section 162(a)

Pevsner v. Commissioner, 628 F.2d 467 (5th Cir. 1980) is a United States federal income tax case before the Fifth Circuit. It dealt with the issue of whether clothes purchased solely for use at work could be treated as a business expense deduction on a taxpayer's return.

HELD:

- An "objective" (reasonableness) test is used to determine whether clothes worn at work were adaptable to general usage and therefore not deductible.
  - The clothes in this case were adaptable to general usage, regardless of taxpayer's personal preference against wearing the clothes outside of work.

== Facts ==
Sandra J. Pevsner was a manager of the Yves Saint Laurent (YSL) boutique in Dallas, Texas. She was required by her employer to wear YSL clothing while at work and at work-related fashion shows and luncheons. She spent $1,381.91 on YSL clothing (at a discount) to meet these requirements, and subsequently deducted that amount from her 1975 federal income tax return as an ordinary and necessary business expense.

== Tax Court Ruling ==
In the tax court, the Commissioner argued that the clothing was "suitable for general or personal wear" and should therefore not be deductible. Pevsner argued (and the commissioner stipulated) that she has never worn the clothing outside of work and considers the clothing "too expensive for her simple everyday lifestyle." The tax court ruled that the test should be subjective to the taxpayer, and allowed the deduction on the grounds that "wearing of YSL apparel outside work would be inconsistent with … (taxpayer's) lifestyle."

== Issue ==
Is the cost of the YSL clothing purchased by Pevsner deductible as an ordinary and necessary business expense?

== Appellate Court Holding ==
The clothing is not deductible as a business expense.

== Reasoning ==
The general rule is that the cost of clothing is deductible as a business expense only if: (1) the clothing is of a type specifically required as a condition of employment, (2) it is not adaptable to general usage as ordinary clothing, and (3) it is not so worn. The court held that the question of whether clothing is adaptable to general usage is to be approached with an objective test, rejecting the subjective test employed by the tax court below.

The court justified an objective test by citing cases from other circuits. The court also endorsed an objective test on policy grounds. First, the court reasoned that an objective test is more easily administered. That is, it would be impractical to determine what combination of price and style would push clothes out of the personal category and into a work-only status. Moreover, a subjective test would involve an examination of a taxpayer's personal taste and fashion sense, providing no guidelines for a court to follow in its determination of what is deductible. Second, under a utilitarian theory, fairness among the greatest number of taxpayers is best served with an objective test. Under a subjective test "two similarly situated YSL boutique managers with identical wardrobes would be subject to disparate tax consequences depending upon the particular manager's lifestyle and 'socio-economic level.'" The court wished to avoid such a result.

== Tax Code ==
The applicable sections of the Tax Code are §§ 162 and 262. These sections must always be looked at together, because § 162 generally allows a deduction for ordinary and necessary expenses incurred in a trade or business while § 262 disallows deductions for all personal, living, or family expenses.

Specifically, § 162(a) states that "there shall be allowed as a deduction all the ordinary and necessary expenses paid or incurred during the taxable year in carrying on any trade or business…." Then, it lists three things that are ordinary and necessary expenses, none of which expressly or implicitly would include the work clothes at issue here. Thus, § 162 is not very helpful for Mrs. Pevsner.

Even less helpful, is § 262. This section holds that "[e]xcept as otherwise expressly provided in this chapter, no deduction shall be allowed for personal, living, or family expenses." Clothing being inherently personal, it seems that the Tax Code cuts against the argument of allowing a deduction here. Although, perhaps if the clothing were made impersonal, via a gaudy nametag or store logo attached, a deduction would be allowed. Unfortunately, at a high-end clothing boutique neither of those is likely.

== Policy ==
Admittedly, policy arguments could be made on both sides of this case. However, since the court ruled in favor of disallowing the deduction, this section will focus on the policy behind that decision.

1. Slippery slope. Allowing a deduction here would be leading down a slippery slope. Once these clothes, which arguably may be used in everyday life, are deductible, then what next? Makeup? Deodorant? Perfumes or cologne? Socks? Underwear? All of these are things that a taxpayer could reasonably say are only for work and that are inconsistent with everyday personal tastes. Clearly, the line must be drawn somewhere.
2. Easy Administration. The court hinted at this argument but did not elaborate much. Millions of taxpayers have to wear certain clothes to work that may not be worn much otherwise. But, who would administer and oversee that there are no abuses if deductions are allowed willy-nilly? Soon enough, every taxpayer would be claiming ties, shirts, dress pants, and all sorts of clothing as work-only while easily being able to double-dip and wear them outside of work. Enforcement of such a system would be a logistical nightmare. It is much easier to administer a system where the general rule is a disallowance and then let taxpayers prove otherwise.
3. Personal Choice. The taxpayer here is choosing to work at the clothing boutique. On the one hand, we want people to be employed and we don't want to make that harder by forcing certain persons to make expenditures that prevent employment. On the other hand, Mrs. Pevsner chose to work at an upscale clothing boutique. She reasonably knew that the dress requisite for work would likely be something that she may not wear otherwise. But, she did receive some breaks. First, she was allowed to wear the clothing outside of work. Then, she was allowed to purchase the clothing at a discount. Finally, she got a lot of use out of the clothing. She wore it to work, to independent meetings, and to fashion shows. This demonstrates the versatility and adaptability of the clothing.

== Significance ==
This decision explains why, for example, a young lawyer who buys a new suit exclusively for work and never dresses in a suit outside of work would not be able to deduct the suit on his or her tax return. Courts will find that the suit is generally suitable for ordinary wear, regardless of the particular lawyer's personal dress habits outside of work.

== Academic Commentary ==
Could question the result–once it is clearly a work requirement, why not allow the deduction? Allowing it seems to fit in with the ruling in Benaglia (personal benefit but lack of personal choice). Commissioner's goal was probably to avoid the need to make case-by-case determination based on presence or absence of "convenience of the employer" argument.
