= Commissioner v. Groetzinger =

- Supreme Court of the United States

Argued December 8, 1986 Decided February 24, 1987
- Full case name: Commissioner of Internal Revenue v. Groetzinger
- Citations: 480 U.S. 23 (more) 107 S. Ct. 980; 94 L. Ed. 2d 25

Case history
- Prior: Groetzinger v. Commissioner, 82 T.C. 793 (1984); affirmed, 771 F.2d 269 (7th Cir. 1985); cert. granted, 475 U.S. 1080 (1986).

Holding
- Under the terms of § 162(a), tax deductions should be granted for all the ordinary and necessary expenses paid or incurred during the taxable year in carrying on any trade or business for tax purposes.

Court membership
- Chief Justice William Rehnquist Associate Justices William J. Brennan Jr. · Byron White; Thurgood Marshall · Harry Blackmun; Lewis F. Powell Jr. · John P. Stevens; Sandra Day O'Connor · Antonin Scalia

Case opinions
- Majority: Blackmun, joined by Brennan, Marshall, Powell, Stevens, O'Connor
- Dissent: White, joined by Rehnquist, Scalia

Laws applied
- Internal Revenue Code section 162(a) (26 U.S.C. § 162(a))

Commissioner v. Groetzinger, 480 U.S. 23 (1987), is a decision of the Supreme Court of the United States, which addressed the issue of what qualifies as being either a trade or business under Section 162(a) of the Internal Revenue Code. Under the terms of § 162(a), tax deductions should be granted "for all the ordinary and necessary expenses paid or incurred during the taxable year in carrying on any trade or business for tax purposes." However, the term "trade or Business" is not defined anywhere in the Internal Revenue Code. The case of Commissioner v. Groetzinger examined what is required for an activity to rise to the level of a "trade or business" for tax purposes. The particular question presented in this case was whether a full-time gambler who made wagers for his own account was engaged in a "trade or business."

== Holding ==
In the absence of an all-purpose definition by statute or regulation, the Court decided not to create a specific test to determine what qualifies as a trade or business. Instead, the Court found that such a decision requires an examination of the facts in each case. As for gambling in particular, the Court concluded that "if one's gambling activity is pursued full time, in good faith, and with regularity, to the production of income for livelihood, and is not a mere hobby" it is a trade or business within the meaning of §162(a) of the Internal Revenue Code.

== Behind the Holding ==
Historically, Congress has distinguished between business and trade and transactions that a party might have entered into for purposes of profit but that are not necessarily related to trade or business. The Court agreed that to be engaged in a trade or business, the taxpayer must be involved in the activity with continuity and regularity and that the taxpayer's primary purpose for engaging in the activity must be for profit or income. The taxpayer in this case spent 60 to 80 hours a week doing gambling-related activities. He had no other type of employment. In the tax year at issue in the case, the taxpayer had earned $70,000 in gambling winnings. The Court found that the constant and large scale effort the taxpayer made towards gambling qualified it being a trade or business. It was more than just a hobby or amusement; it was his livelihood. Under the basic concepts of fairness, the Court held that the ordinary and necessary expenses paid or incurred during the taxable year in carrying out the taxpayer's gambling business could be deducted under the terms of §162(a).

== Importance ==
Commissioner v. Groetzinger explains that in deciding whether an activity is a trade or business courts need to examine the facts on a case-by-case basis, looking into whether the taxpayer devoted his or her full-time efforts towards the activity on a regular, continuous, and substantial basis.

== See also ==
- Internal Revenue Code section 162(a)
- List of United States Supreme Court cases
  - Lists of United States Supreme Court cases by volume
  - List of United States Supreme Court cases, volume 480
  - List of United States Supreme Court cases by the Rehnquist Court
