= Home Building & Loan Ass'n v. Blaisdell =

Home Bldg. & Loan Ass'n v. Blaisdell
- Supreme Court of the United States

Argued November 8–9, 1933 Decided January 8, 1934
- Full case name: Home Building & Loan Association v. Blaisdell, et ux.
- Citations: 290 U.S. 398 (more) 54 S. Ct. 231, 78 L. Ed. 413, 1934 U.S. LEXIS 958; 88 A.L.R. 1481

Case history
- Prior: Appeal from the Supreme Court of the State of Minnesota.

Holding
- Minnesota's suspension of creditor's remedies was not in violation of the U.S. Constitution. Minnesota Mortgage Moratorium Act upheld.

Court membership
- Chief Justice Charles E. Hughes Associate Justices Willis Van Devanter · James C. McReynolds; Louis Brandeis · George Sutherland; Pierce Butler · Harlan F. Stone; Owen Roberts · Benjamin N. Cardozo

Case opinions
- Majority: Hughes, joined by Brandeis, Stone, Roberts, Cardozo
- Dissent: Sutherland, joined by Van Devanter, McReynolds, Butler

Home Building & Loan Association v. Blaisdell, 290 U.S. 398 (1934), also called the Minnesota Mortgage Moratorium Case, was a decision of the United States Supreme Court holding that Minnesota's suspension of creditors' remedies was not in violation of the Contract Clause of the United States Constitution. Blaisdell was decided during the depth of the Great Depression and has been criticized by modern conservative and libertarian commentators.

== Background and decision ==
In 1933, in response to a large number of home foreclosures, Minnesota, like many other states at the time, extended the time available for mortgagors to redeem their mortgages from foreclosure. The appellee owned a lot in Minneapolis that was in the foreclosure process. The extension had the effect of enlarging the mortgagor's estate contrary to the terms of the contract.

The Supreme Court upheld the statute, reasoning that the emergency conditions created by the Great Depression "may justify the exercise of [the State's] continuing and dominant protective power notwithstanding interference with contracts." Blaisdell was the first time the court extended the emergency exception to purely economic emergencies.

In the holding, Justices Hughes and Roberts sided with the Three Musketeers (Supreme Court). The Four Horsemen of Reaction came down on the other side of the ruling.

While the Blaisdell judgment itself might have been held to apply only in limited instances of economic emergency, by the late 1930s the emergency exception doctrine had expanded dramatically.

== Criticism ==
Adherents of the Chicago school of economics have characterized Blaisdell among the Court precedents that have diminished constitutional protection of individual property rights. Richard Epstein's (the Laurence A. Tisch Professor of Law at the New York University School of Law and Adjunct Scholar at the American libertarian think tank Cato Institute) criticisms have been some of the most vocal:

Blaisdell trumpeted a false liberation from the constitutional text that has paved the way for massive government intervention that undermines the security of private transactions. Today the police power exception has come to eviscerate the contracts clause.

== See also ==
- List of United States Supreme Court cases, volume 290
- Gold Clause Cases (1935)
- Constitutional challenges to the New Deal
