= United States v. Sullivan =

- Supreme Court of the United States

Argued April 27, 1927 Decided May 16, 1927
- Full case name: United States of America v. Manley Sullivan
- Citations: 274 U.S. 259 (more) 47 S. Ct. 607; 71 L. Ed. 1037; 1927 U.S. LEXIS 25

Case history
- Prior: 15 F.2d 809 (4th Cir. 1926)

Holding
- The Fifth Amendment does not bar prosecution of criminals for failing to file income tax returns based on ill-gotten gains.

Court membership
- Chief Justice William H. Taft Associate Justices Oliver W. Holmes Jr. · Willis Van Devanter; James C. McReynolds · Louis Brandeis; George Sutherland · Pierce Butler; Edward T. Sanford · Harlan F. Stone

Case opinion
- Majority: Holmes, joined by unanimous

Laws applied
- U.S. Const. amend. V; Revenue Act of 1921

United States v. Sullivan, 274 U.S. 259 (1927), is a United States Supreme Court case that allowed prosecution of criminals for income tax evasion notwithstanding the Fifth Amendment.

The case also served as the legal test for prosecution of Al Capone for tax evasion by Assistant Attorney General Mabel Walker Willebrandt. Willebrandt theorized illegally earned income was subject to income tax, and she tested her theory using Sullivan. Once the theory was found sound, she moved to prosecute Capone in 1931.

== Background ==
In the 1920s, during the Prohibition Era, the successful prosecution of prominent organized crime bosses was nearly impossible because of witness intimidation and the lack of written records. Mabel Walker Willebrandt, then an Assistant Attorney General in charge of enforcing the Volstead Act, recognized that the figures publicly led lavish lifestyles but never filed tax returns and so might be prosecuted for that failure without testimony being required about the specific crimes that enriched them.

The first person prosecuted under that theory was Manley Sullivan, a South Carolina bootlegger. Sullivan's lawyers argued that filing a tax return on illegal income would amount to self-incrimination and so he was therefore protected by the Fifth Amendment.

Sullivan was acquitted in the district court on Fifth Amendment grounds, but the Fourth Circuit Court of Appeals reversed the decision. The Supreme court later upheld the circuit court’s decision.

== Decision ==
Justice Oliver Wendell Holmes Jr. wrote for the court. He noted that the Revenue Act of 1921 provided that gross income includes "gains, profits, and income derived from... the transaction of any business carried on for gain or profit, or gains or profits and income derived from any source whatever."

Although the 1913 version of law had included the word "lawful" before "business," Congress removed the word "lawful" in 1921. Holmes rejected the Fifth Amendment argument by saying that a defendant who believed information required on the tax form to incriminate him could raise that issue on the form but could not simply refuse to file. Holmes dispatched another objection:

It is urged that, if a return were made, the defendant would be entitled to deduct illegal expenses, such as bribery. This by no means follows, but it will be time enough to consider the question when a taxpayer has the temerity to raise it.

== Aftermath ==
Many criminals (and others) have since been prosecuted for tax evasion. In particular, Al Capone was convicted in 1931.

Publication 17 of the Internal Revenue Service still notes that "[i]ncome from illegal activities," including money from dealing illegal drugs or bribes received, must be included in the declaration of one's income.

== See also ==
- Public policy limitation on deduction for business expenses
- Taxation of illegal income in the United States
