= Expenses versus capital expenditures =

Under the U.S. tax code, businesses expenditures can be deducted from the total taxable income when filing income taxes if a taxpayer can show the funds were used for business-related activities, not personal or capital expenses (i.e., long-term, tangible assets, such as property). Capital expenditures either create cost basis or add to a preexisting cost basis and cannot be deducted in the year the taxpayer pays or incurs the expenditure.

In terms of its accounting treatment, an expense is recorded immediately and impacts directly the income statement of the company, reducing its net profit. In contrast, a capital expenditure is capitalized, recorded as an asset and depreciated over time.

== Four ways costs can be capital expenditures ==
The Internal Revenue Code, Treasury Regulations (including new regulations proposed in 2006), and case law set forth a series of guidelines that help to distinguish expenses from capital expenditures, although in reality distinguishing between these two types of costs can be extremely difficult. In general, four types of costs related to tangible property must be capitalized:

1. Costs that produce a benefit that will last substantially beyond the end of the taxable year.

2. New assets that have a useful life substantially beyond one year. For example, in Commissioner v. Idaho Power Co., the taxpayer used its own equipment to construct and improve various facilities that it owned. The taxpayer sought to have the depreciation of the construction equipment treated as a deduction. The Court held that because the equipment was used to invest in a capital asset – the new and improved facilities – the costs had to be treated as capital expenditures.

3. Improvements that prolong the life of the property, restore property to a “like-new” condition, or add value to the property. For example, in Fedex Corp. v. United States, the taxpayer performed repairs upon jet engines by removing them from the airplane and then having parts replaced. The taxpayer argued that these expenses were deductible, but the IRS stated that the costs should be capitalized. The court held that the inspection and replacement costs could be deducted because the improvements did not add to the value and did not prolong the life of the airplanes as a whole. In Midland Empire Packing Co. v. Commissioner, the taxpayer added a concrete lining to its basement floor to prevent oil from seeping into where the taxpayer stored meat. The taxpayer argued that the costs of installation were deductible and the tax court agreed. The costs of installation only permitted the taxpayer to continue the plant's operation. The expenses did not add to the value of the business or permit the taxpayer to make new uses of the basement.

4. Adaptations that permit the property to be used for a new or different purpose. In contrast to Midland Empire Packing Co., in Mt. Morris Drive-In Theatre Co. v. Commissioner, under threat of litigation, the taxpayer was forced to create a new drainage system to prevent run-off rainwater from flooding his neighbor's farm. The taxpayer argued that these costs were deductible, but the tax court disagreed. Because the taxpayer knew in advance the property had an inadequate drainage system, the costs to accomplish this adaptation of the property were a capital expenditure. The costs were not simply an improvement of the preexisting drainage system, but rather a completely new addition to the property that permitted the taxpayer to use the property as a drive-in theater.

Though it is an oversimplification, when trying to distinguish between expenses and capital expenditures it can be helpful to remember that the U.S. tax code attempts to levy tax on those most able to pay it.

== Illustrative example ==
Imagine that a business buys a truck for $50,000 and uses $5,000 this year on gasoline to distribute tomatoes upon which it earned $20,000. If we want to apportion tax on the business according to its abilities to pay we should ask, "how much better off is the business in Year One?" It seems unfair to say that the business is $20,000 better off than at the beginning of the year - after all it spent $55,000 to earn those $20,000. However, it also seems unfair to say that the business is $35,000 worse off (the $20,000 earned minus the $55,000 spent) – after all it also has a truck which it will use for years to come.

Probably the fairest characterization is to say that in Year One the business earned $20,000, spent $5,000 on gas, and "spent" some (but not all) of the value of the truck it purchased. Since the $5,000 on gas was consumed in Year One and all of its value has been provided during Year One its full cost is properly offset against the income of Year One. In other words, it is an expense, and it is recorded right away as such. On the other hand, the truck will contribute to income in Year One, but also contribute to income in future years. Since the truck's benefits are spread over the years that the truck is in use, we will want to spread the cost of the truck over those subsequent years as well. Otherwise the business would appear overly burdened in Year One and unnaturally profitable every year thereafter. Thus the truck is a capital expenditure which should be depreciated. However, keep in mind that while depreciation spreads the cost of a capital asset over several years (for tax purposes) it is not intended to actually mirror the real world wear and tear on the asset.

== See also ==
- Capital expenditure
