= Benaglia v. Commissioner =

- Court: U.S. Board of Tax Appeals
- Decided: 1937

Keywords
- Income tax; Employee benefit

Benaglia v. Commissioner 36 B.T.A. 838 (1937) is a United States income tax case heard in the U.S. Board of Tax Appeals, discussing when an employee can exclude employer-provided benefits from his income. The Board held that a taxpayer employee may exclude the value of food and lodging received from his employer, if he receives it solely for the convenience of his employer and as a necessary incident of the proper performance of his duty. The meals-and-lodging exclusion has been formalized as §119 in the tax code.

== Background ==
The petitioner managed hotels in Honolulu. He and his wife occupied a suite and received meals at and from the hotel, but did not report their value in his income. The Commissioner added $7,845 each year to gross income as compensation from Hawaiian Hotels, Ltd.

== Holding ==
The Board heard the issue of whether the residence and meals at the hotel were compensation and therefore part of petitioner's gross income for which he could be taxed. The petitioner lived at the hotel solely because he could not otherwise perform the services required of him. The occupation of the premises was imposed upon him for the benefit of the employer. This is not to say that anytime an employee is fed or lodged by the employer that it is not taxable income. The court also looked at the intent of the parties and decided the employer never intended the room and board to form part of his compensation.

== Dissent ==
The living quarters and meals were included in a letter forming the employment contract and therefore was intended to be compensation. He was relieved of having to pay for lodging and meals, therefore he was enriched. The majority thinks the question is one of convenience, but the real issue is whether the petitioner benefited financially. If it was necessary to live on the premises, occupancy at the Moana (another hotel owned by Hawaiian Hotels) would have been equally essential, yet he did not have living quarters or meals there.

== Aftermath ==
Though this case established the important doctrine of "convenience of the employer", §119(a) of the tax code now has two other requirements that are needed in order to take fringe benefit exclusions for meals and lodging. First, it must be on the business premises. Second, in the case of lodging, it must be a condition of taking the job.
