= Mazzei v. Commissioner =

United States Tax Court case

- Court: United States Tax Court
- Full case name: Mazzei v. Commissioner
- Decided: January 23, 1974
- Citation: 61 T.C. 497 (1974)

Court membership
- Judges sitting: William H. Quealy, Howard Dawson, William Miller Drennen, Arnold Raum, Featherston, Bruce Forrester, Sterrett, Hall, Darrell D. Wiles

Case opinions
- Decision by: Quealy
- Concurrence: Dawson, joined by Drennen
- Concurrence: Tannenwald, joined by Dawson, Raum
- Dissent: Featherston, joined by Forrester, Sterrett, Hall
- Dissent: Sterrett, joined by Forrester, Featherston, Hall, Wiles

Laws applied
- Internal Revenue Code

Mazzei v. Commissioner, 61 T.C. 497 (1974), was a United States Tax Court case in which the Court ruled that a taxpayer could not consider $20,000 lost to a fraudulent counterfeiting scheme as a basis for a deduction under section 165(c)(3) of the Internal Revenue Code ("Code").

== Background ==
Raymond Mazzei, the petitioner, operated a sheet metal company in Hopewell, Virginia. An employee introduced the petitioner to several individuals who claimed to be in possession of a machine capable of reproducing U.S. currency. The petitioner agreed to provide $100 bills to the counterfeiters to be used in the reproduction process. Upon completion of the process, the bills (and presumably some compensation) were to be returned to Mazzei.

To further this scheme, he acquired $20,000 in $100 bills and brought them to New York City to meet with the counterfeiters. While meeting with the counterfeiters at an apartment, two armed men claiming to be law enforcement officers entered and took the money at gunpoint.

The petitioner found a legitimate police officer shortly thereafter but was unable to secure the return of the $20,000. The police discovered that the "counterfeiting device" was nothing more than a black box incapable of reproducing currency.

The petitioner took a deduction of $19,900 (the first $100 of a section 165(c)(3) loss is not deductible) on his federal income tax return under section 165(c)(2) or (3) of the Code. The IRS issued a notice of deficiency, informing the petitioner that the loss lacked adequate substantiation, and that even were the loss substantiated, allowing the deduction would contradict public policy.

Section 165(c)(2) allows a deduction for "losses incurred in any transaction entered into for profit, though not connected with a trade or business", and section 165(c)(3) allows a deduction for losses not incurred in connection with a business or income-producing venture, which "arise from fire, storm, shipwreck, or other casualty, or from theft".

== Tax Court Holding ==
The Tax Court found that the $20,000 loss was substantiated by the evidence presented, but ultimately ruled against petitioner on grounds of public policy. A strict interpretation of section 165(c)(3) places no restrictions on the allowance of deductions for theft losses. However, the court was bound by the public policy declared in Richey v. Commissioner, 33 T.C. 272 (1959).

In Richey, a factually-similar case in which the taxpayer also provided currency for a counterfeiting scheme, the taxpayer actually assisted with some of the chores involved with the "counterfeiting process" before he realized that his cash had been stolen. The Tax Court found that petitioner, therefore, "was part and parcel of the attempt to duplicate the money" and "to allow the loss deduction in the instant case would constitute a severe and immediate frustration of the clearly defined policy against counterfeiting…".

In Mazzei, the court reasoned that petitioner's act of participating in a conspiracy to produce counterfeit currency fell clearly within the public policy declared in Richey. Petitioner attempted to distinguish the instant case from Richey by arguing that the Richey taxpayer directly participated in chores contributing to a scheme which was capable of actually reproduce currency. On the other hand, in the instant case, petitioner merely provided the cash to a sham scheme which lacked the capacity to reproduce currency. The court rejected this argument, finding that although petitioner did not participate in the counterfeiting "process" in the same capacity as the Richey taxpayer, his actions did constitute a conspiracy in violation of U.S. law.
