= Sibla v. Commissioner =

- Court: United States Court of Appeals for the Ninth Circuit
- Full case name: Richard R. Sibla v. Commissioner of Internal Revenue, et al
- Decided: January 7, 1980
- Citations: 611 F.2d 1260; 80-1 USTC (CCH) ¶ 9143

Court membership
- Judges sitting: Anthony Kennedy, Thomas Tang, Jesse W. Curtis

Case opinions
- Majority: Curtis, joined by Tang
- Dissent: Kennedy

Laws applied
- Internal Revenue Code section 162(a)

Sibla v. Commissioner, 611 F.2d 1260 (9th Cir. 1980), was an important income tax case regarding 26 U.S.C.S. § 162(a).

== Background ==
=== Facts ===
Petitioner firefighter taxpayers were required to participate in a mandatory organized mess at their station house and to pay for the station house meals even when their duties took them away from the station at mess time.

=== Tax return ===
Petitioners claimed the cost of the meals as business deductions under 26 U.S.C.S. § 162(a). Respondent Commissioner of Internal Revenue disallowed the deductions.

=== Tax court ===
The tax court overruled respondent and allowed the deduction

=== Issues ===
Respondent Commissioner of Internal Revenue, in consolidated cases, appealed the judgments from the United States Tax Court, which held that under 26 U.S.C.S. § 162(a), petitioner firefighter taxpayers could deduct the amount that their employer charged them for their meals under its mandatory organized mess. Respondent claimed that the charge was a nondeductible personal expense under 26 U.S.C.S. § 262.

== Opinion of the court ==
On appeal, the court found that petitioners' participation in the organized mess was not voluntary, that the charge for the meals equaled the value of the meals, that the mandatory mess was for the convenience of the employer as part of its integration program, and that the employer did not reimburse petitioners for meals that they were not able to eat at the station. Thus, the expenses of the mess were not nondeductible living expenses under 26 U.S.C.S. § 262, but were either deductible business expenses under § 162(a) or were employer-furnished meals that were excludable from income under 26 U.S.C.S. § 119. Therefore, the court affirmed the judgments.

The court affirmed the judgments allowing petitioner firefighter taxpayers to deduct the amount that they paid for their meals as part of their employer's mandatory organized mess. The court held that because the payment was involuntary whether or not petitioners ate their meals at the mess, petitioners could deduct the cost as business expenses or exclude it from income as meals furnished by their employer for the employer's convenience.
