= List of United States Supreme Court cases, volume 290 =

Supreme Court of the United States
- Interactive map of Supreme Court of the United States
- 38°53′26″N 77°00′16″W
- Established: March 4, 1789; 237 years ago
- Location: Washington, D.C.
- Coordinates: 38°53′26″N 77°00′16″W
- Composition method: Presidential nomination with Senate confirmation
- Authorised by: Constitution of the United States, Art. III, § 1
- Judge term length: life tenure, subject to impeachment and removal
- Number of positions: 9 (by statute)
- Website: supremecourt.gov

This is a list of cases reported in volume 290 of United States Reports, decided by the Supreme Court of the United States in 1933 and 1934.

== Justices of the Supreme Court at the time of volume 290 U.S. ==
The Supreme Court is established by Article III, Section 1 of the Constitution of the United States, which says: "The judicial Power of the United States, shall be vested in one supreme Court . . .". The size of the Court is not specified; the Constitution leaves it to Congress to set the number of justices. Under the Judiciary Act of 1789 Congress originally fixed the number of justices at six (one chief justice and five associate justices). Since 1789 Congress has varied the size of the Court from six to seven, nine, ten, and back to nine justices (always including one chief justice).

When the cases in volume 290 were decided the Court comprised the following nine members:

Portrait	Justice	Office	Home State	Succeeded	Date confirmed by the Senate (Vote)	Tenure on Supreme Court
	Charles Evans Hughes	Chief Justice	New York	William Howard Taft	February 13, 1930 (52–26)	February 24, 1930 – June 30, 1941 (Retired)
	Willis Van Devanter	Associate Justice	Wyoming	Edward Douglass White (as Associate Justice)	December 15, 1910 (Acclamation)	January 3, 1911 – June 2, 1937 (Retired)
	James Clark McReynolds	Associate Justice	Tennessee	Horace Harmon Lurton	August 29, 1914 (44–6)	October 12, 1914 – January 31, 1941 (Retired)
	Louis Brandeis	Associate Justice	Massachusetts	Joseph Rucker Lamar	June 1, 1916 (47–22)	June 5, 1916 – February 13, 1939 (Retired)
	George Sutherland	Associate Justice	Utah	John Hessin Clarke	September 5, 1922 (Acclamation)	October 2, 1922 – January 17, 1938 (Retired)
	Pierce Butler	Associate Justice	Minnesota	William R. Day	December 21, 1922 (61–8)	January 2, 1923 – November 16, 1939 (Died)
	Harlan F. Stone	Associate Justice	New York	Joseph McKenna	February 5, 1925 (71–6)	March 2, 1925 – July 2, 1941 (Continued as chief justice)
	Owen Roberts	Associate Justice	Pennsylvania	Edward Terry Sanford	May 20, 1930 (Acclamation)	June 2, 1930 – July 31, 1945 (Resigned)
	Benjamin N. Cardozo	Associate Justice	New York	Oliver Wendell Holmes Jr.	February 24, 1932 (Acclamation)	March 14, 1932 – July 9, 1938 (Died)

== Notable Cases in 290 U.S. ==
=== Welch v. Helvering ===
In Welch v. Helvering, 290 U.S. 111 (1933), the Supreme Court ruled on the difference between business and personal expenses and the difference between ordinary business deductions and capital expenses. It is one of the most important income tax law cases.

=== Home Building and Loan Association v. Blaisdell ===
In Home Building and Loan Association v. Blaisdell, 290 U.S. 398 (1934), the Supreme Court held that Minnesota's suspension of creditors' remedies was not in violation of the Contract Clause of the United States Constitution. Blaisdell was decided during the depth of the Great Depression and has been criticized by modern conservative and libertarian commentators. In 1933, in response to a large number of home foreclosures, Minnesota, like many other states at the time, extended the time available for mortgagors to redeem their mortgages from foreclosure. The appellee owned a lot in Minneapolis that was in the foreclosure process. The extension had the effect of enlarging the mortgagor's estate contrary to the terms of the contract. The Supreme Court upheld the statute, reasoning that the emergency conditions created by the Great Depression "may justify the exercise of [the State's] continuing and dominant protective power notwithstanding interference with contracts." Blaisdell was the first time the court extended the emergency exception to purely economic emergencies. While Blaisdell itself might have been held to apply only in limited instances of economic emergency, by the late 1930s the emergency exception doctrine had expanded dramatically.

== Federal court system ==
Under the Judiciary Act of 1789 the federal court structure at the time comprised District Courts, which had general trial jurisdiction; Circuit Courts, which had mixed trial and appellate (from the US District Courts) jurisdiction; and the United States Supreme Court, which had appellate jurisdiction over the federal District and Circuit courts—and for certain issues over state courts. The Supreme Court also had limited original jurisdiction (i.e., in which cases could be filed directly with the Supreme Court without first having been heard by a lower federal or state court). There were one or more federal District Courts and/or Circuit Courts in each state, territory, or other geographical region.

The Judiciary Act of 1891 created the United States Courts of Appeals and reassigned the jurisdiction of most routine appeals from the district and circuit courts to these appellate courts. The Act created nine new courts that were originally known as the "United States Circuit Courts of Appeals." The new courts had jurisdiction over most appeals of lower court decisions. The Supreme Court could review either legal issues that a court of appeals certified or decisions of court of appeals by writ of certiorari. On January 1, 1912, the effective date of the Judicial Code of 1911, the old Circuit Courts were abolished, with their remaining trial court jurisdiction transferred to the U.S. District Courts.

== List of cases in volume 290 U.S. ==
Case name	Citation	Opinion of the Court	Vote	Concurring opinion or statement	Dissenting opinion or statement	Procedural jurisdiction	Result
Minnesota v. Blasius	290 U.S. 1 (1933)	Hughes	9–0	none	none	certiorari to the Minnesota Supreme Court (Minn.)	judgment reversed
Jacobs v. United States	290 U.S. 13 (1933)	Hughes	9–0	none	none	certiorari to the United States Court of Appeals for the Fifth Circuit (5th Cir.)	judgment reversed, and cause remanded
Missouri v. Fiske	290 U.S. 18 (1933)	Hughes	9–0	none	none	certiorari to the United States Court of Appeals for the Eighth Circuit (8th Cir.)	judgment reversed, and cause remanded
Ex parte Poresky	290 U.S. 30 (1933)	per curiam	9–0	none	none	motion for leave to file petition for writ of mandamus to the United States District Court for the District of Massachusetts (D. Mass.)	leave to file petition for writ of mandamus denied
United States v. Reily	290 U.S. 33 (1933)	VanDevanter	9–0	none	none	certiorari to the United States Court of Appeals for the Tenth Circuit (10th Cir.)	decree reversed
Nathanson v. United States	290 U.S. 41 (1933)	McReynolds	9–0	none	none	certiorari to the United States Court of Appeals for the Third Circuit (3d Cir.)	judgment reversed
Trainor Company v. Aetna Casualty and Surety Company	290 U.S. 47 (1933)	Sutherland	9–0	none	none	certiorari to the United States Court of Appeals for the Third Circuit (3d Cir.)	judgments of the courts below reversed, and cause remanded
Griswold v. Helvering, Commissioner of Internal Revenue	290 U.S. 56 (1933)	Sutherland	9–0	none	none	certiorari to the United States Court of Appeals for the Seventh Circuit (7th Cir.)	judgment affirmed
Oakes v. Lake	290 U.S. 59 (1933)	Sutherland	9–0	none	none	certiorari to the United States Court of Appeals for the Ninth Circuit (9th Cir.)	judgment reversed, and cause remanded
Fidelity and Deposit Company of Maryland v. Arenz	290 U.S. 66 (1933)	Butler	9–0	none	none	certiorari to the United States Court of Appeals for the Ninth Circuit (9th Cir.)	judgment reversed
United States v. Louisiana	290 U.S. 70 (1933)	Stone	9–0	none	none	appeal from the United States District Court for the Eastern District of Louisiana (E.D. La.)	judgment reversed
Cullen Fuel Company v. W.E. Hedger, Inc.	290 U.S. 82 (1933)	Roberts	9–0	none	none	certiorari to the United States Court of Appeals for the Second Circuit (2d Cir.)	judgment affirmed
John K. and Catherine S. Mullen Benevolent Corporation v. United States	290 U.S. 89 (1933)	Roberts	9–0	none	none	certiorari to the United States Court of Appeals for the Ninth Circuit (9th Cir.)	judgment affirmed
Shepard v. United States	290 U.S. 96 (1933)	Cardozo	9–0	none	none	certiorari to the United States Court of Appeals for the Tenth Circuit (10th Cir.)	judgment reversed, and cause remanded
Cooper v. Dasher	290 U.S. 106 (1933)	Cardozo	9–0	none	none	certiorari to the United States Court of Appeals for the Fifth Circuit (5th Cir.)	judgment reversed, and cause remanded
Welch v. Helvering, Commissioner of Internal Revenue	290 U.S. 111 (1933)	Cardozo	9–0	none	none	certiorari to the United States Court of Appeals for the Eighth Circuit (8th Cir.)	decree affirmed
Krauss Brothers Lumber Company v. Dimon Steamship Corporation	290 U.S. 117 (1933)	Stone	5–4	none	McReynolds, Sutherland, Butler, and Roberts (joint short statement)	certiorari to the United States Court of Appeals for the Ninth Circuit (9th Cir.)	judgment reversed
Butte, Anaconda and Pacific Railway Company v. United States	290 U.S. 127 (1933)	Brandeis	9–0	none	none	certiorari to the United States Court of Appeals for the Ninth Circuit (9th Cir.)	judgment reversed
Dakin v. Bayly	290 U.S. 143 (1933)	Roberts	8–1	none	Stone (opinion)	certiorari to the United States Court of Appeals for the Fifth Circuit (5th Cir.)	judgment reversed
Johnson Oil Refining Company v. Oklahoma ex rel. Mitchell, County Attorney	290 U.S. 158 (1933)	Hughes	9–0	none	none	appeals from the Oklahoma Supreme Court (Okla.)	judgments reversed, and causes remanded
Funkhouser v. J.B. Preston Company	290 U.S. 163 (1933)	Hughes	9–0	none	none	appeal from the New York Supreme Court (N.Y. Sup. Ct.)	judgment affirmed
Hicklin v. Coney	290 U.S. 169 (1933)	Hughes	9–0	none	none	appeal from the South Carolina Supreme Court (S.C.)	judgment affirmed
Glenn v. Field Packing Company	290 U.S. 177 (1933)	per curiam	9–0	none	none	appeal from the United States District Court for the Western District of Kentucky (W.D. Ky.)	judgment affirmed as modified
Bullard v. City of Cisco	290 U.S. 179 (1933)	VanDevanter	9–0	none	none	certiorari to the United States Court of Appeals for the Fifth Circuit (5th Cir.)	judgments reversed, and causes remanded
Southern Railway Company v. Virginia	290 U.S. 190 (1933)	McReynolds	6–3	none	Hughes, Stone, and Cardozo (joint short statement)	appeal from the Virginia Supreme Court (Va.)	judgment reversed, and cause remanded
Missouri State Life Insurance Company v. Jones	290 U.S. 199 (1933)	McReynolds	9–0	none	none	certiorari to the Arkansas Supreme Court (Ark.)	judgment reversed
Yarborough v. Yarborough	290 U.S. 202 (1933)	Brandeis	7–2	none	Stone (opinion; with which Cardozo concurred)	certiorari to the South Carolina Supreme Court (S.C.)	judgment reversed
Miller v. Union Pacific Railroad Company	290 U.S. 227 (1933)	Sutherland	9–0	none	none	certiorari to the United States Court of Appeals for the Eighth Circuit (8th Cir.)	judgment reversed, and cause remanded
Keystone Driller Company v. General Excavator Company	290 U.S. 240 (1933)	Butler	9–0	none	none	certiorari to the United States Court of Appeals for the Sixth Circuit (6th Cir.)	judgment affirmed
Federal Land Bank of Columbia v. Gaines	290 U.S. 247 (1933)	Stone	9–0	none	none	certiorari to the North Carolina Supreme Court (N.C.)	judgment reversed
Alaska Steamship Company v. United States	290 U.S. 256 (1933)	Stone	9–0	none	none	certiorari to the United States Court of Appeals for the Ninth Circuit (9th Cir.)	judgment reversed
Central Kentucky Natural Gas Company v. Railroad Commission of Kentucky	290 U.S. 264 (1933)	Stone	8-0[a]	none	none	appeal from the United States District Court for the Eastern District of Kentucky (E.D. Ky.)	judgment reversed
Factor v. Laubenheimer, U.S. Marshal	290 U.S. 276 (1933)	Stone	6–3	none	Butler (opinion; joined by Brandeis and Roberts)	certiorari to the United States Court of Appeals for the Seventh Circuit (7th Cir.)	judgment affirmed
Stringfellow v. Atlantic Coast Line Railroad Company	290 U.S. 322 (1933)	Roberts	9–0	none	none	certiorari to the United States Court of Appeals for the Fifth Circuit (5th Cir.)	judgment reversed
Gibbes v. Zimmerman	290 U.S. 326 (1933)	Roberts	9–0	none	none	appeal from the South Carolina Supreme Court (S.C.)	judgment affirmed
May v. Hamburg-Amerikanische Packetfahrt A.G.	290 U.S. 333 (1933)	Cardozo	7–2	none	MvReynolds and Butler (without opinions)	certiorari to the United States Court of Appeals for the Second Circuit (2d Cir.)	judgment reversed, and cause remanded
Trotter v. Tennessee	290 U.S. 354 (1933)	Cardozo	9–0	none	none	certiorari to the Tennessee Supreme Court (Tenn.)	judgment affirmed
United States v. Chavez	290 U.S. 357 (1933)	VanDevanter	9–0	none	none	appeal from the United States District Court for the District of New Mexico (D.N.M.)	judgment reversed
Helvering, Commissioner of Internal Revenue v. Butterworth	290 U.S. 365 (1933)	McReynolds	8–1	none	Hughes (opinion)	certiorari to the United States Court of Appeals for the Third Circuit (3d Cir.)	judgment reversed
Funk v. United States	290 U.S. 371 (1933)	Sutherland	7–2	Cardozo (without opinion)	McReynolds and Butler (without opinions)	certiorari to the United States Court of Appeals for the Fourth Circuit (4th Cir.)	judgment reversed
Ormsby v. Executors	290 U.S. 387 (1933)	Butler	8-0[b]	none	none	certiorari to the United States Court of Appeals for the Third Circuit (3d Cir.)	judgment reversed
United States v. Murdock	290 U.S. 389 (1933)	Roberts	7–2	none	Stone and Cardozo (without opinions)	certiorari to the United States Court of Appeals for the Seventh Circuit (7th Cir.)	judgment affirmed
Home Building and Loan Association v. Blaisdell	290 U.S. 398 (1934)	Hughes	5–4	none	Sutherland (opinion; with which VanDevanter, McReynolds, and Butler concurred)	appeal from the Minnesota Supreme Court (Minn.)	judgment affirmed
Alexander, Collector of Internal Revenue v. Cosden Pipe Line Company	290 U.S. 484 (1934)	VanDevanter	9–0	none	none	certiorari to the United States Court of Appeals for the Tenth Circuit (10th Cir.)	judgment reversed, and cause remanded
Northwestern Pacific Railroad Company v. Bobo	290 U.S. 499 (1934)	McReynolds	9–0	none	none	certiorari to the California Court of Appeal (Cal. Dist. Ct. App.)	judgment reversed
First National Bank of Cincinnati v. Flershem	290 U.S. 504 (1934)	Brandeis	9–0	none	none	certiorari to the United States Court of Appeals for the Third Circuit (3d Cir.)	decree reversed in three cases; decree affirmed as modified in one case
Fix, Collector of Internal Revenue v. Philadelphia Barge Company	290 U.S. 530 (1934)	Sutherland	9–0	none	none	certiorari to the United States Court of Appeals for the Third Circuit (3d Cir.)	judgment reversed
Burroughs and Cannon v. United States	290 U.S. 534 (1934)	Sutherland	8–1	none	McReynolds (opinion)	certiorari to the United States Court of Appeals for the District of Columbia (D.C. Cir.)	judgment affirmed in part
Lumbra v. United States	290 U.S. 551 (1934)	Butler	9–0	none	none	certiorari to the United States Court of Appeals for the Second Circuit (2d Cir.)	judgment affirmed
State Corporation Commission of Kansas v. Wichita Gas Company	290 U.S. 561 (1934)	Butler	9–0	none	none	appeal from the United States District Court for the District of Kansas (D. Kan.)	judgment affirmed as modified
P.F. Petersen Baking Company v. Bryan	290 U.S. 570 (1934)	Butler	9–0	none	none	appeal from the Nebraska Supreme Court (Neb.)	judgment affirmed
Missouri Pacific Railroad Company v. Hartley Brothers	290 U.S. 576 (1934)	Butler	9–0	none	none	certiorari to the Oklahoma Supreme Court (Okla.)	judgment affirmed

[a] Sutherland took no part in the case
[b] Roberts took no part in the case
