= Internal Revenue Code section 162(a) =

US tax law regarding business expenses

Section 162(a) of the Internal Revenue Code (26 U.S.C. § 162(a)), is part of United States taxation law. It concerns deductions for business expenses. It is one of the most important provisions in the Code, because it is the most widely used authority for deductions. If an expense is not deductible, then Congress considers the cost to be a consumption expense. Section 162(a) requires six different elements in order to claim a deduction. It must be an

1) ordinary
2) and necessary
3) expense
4) that was paid or incurred during the taxable year
5) in carrying on
6) a trade or business activity.

These elements have been interpreted by the courts and administrative agencies to determine if an expenditure is deductible as a business expense.

== Ordinary and necessary ==
In general, the expense should be routine and directly related to the business activity. Ordinary does not require be habitual or made often; the court only requires that the expense is one that is ordinary and necessary for that business. For example, in Welch v. Helvering, the United States Supreme Court found that payments must be both ordinary and necessary to be business expenses; it held that although payments made to a creditor by a taxpayer may have been necessary, they were not ordinary because the circumstances under which they were paid were outside the norms of conduct in society. The Welch case is frequently cited for its dictum describing the meaning of the term "necessary" in Section 162 as requiring that expenses merely be "appropriate and helpful [in] the development of the [taxpayer's] business."

In Jenkins v. Commissioner, the Tax Court determined that in order to determine if expenditures are deductible under § 162(a), the Court must first ascertain the motive of the taxpayer in making the expenditures, and then determine if there is a sufficient connection between the expenditures and his/her trade or business. If a taxpayer makes a payment to preserve his/her business reputation, it can be considered an ordinary business expense. However, if the expenses are inherently personal in nature, they are not deductible under section 162(a). In addition, the amount expended must be considered to be reasonable by the court; therefore, if compensation is deemed unreasonable, it exceeds the amount allowable under section 162(a)(1).

== Paid or incurred ==
To be deductible under section 162(a), the expense must be paid or incurred during the taxable year at issue.

== In carrying on ==
The next requirement of section 162(a) is that the taxpayer must be carrying on a trade or business. Start up expenses are not entirely deductible, but must be spread out over 15 years. Because business expenses are fully deductible under section 162, taxpayers try to argue that expenses were not start up expenses. The Second Circuit Court of Appeals found that the Tax Court should look at if employment of the taxpayer is in the same trade or business to determine if it is a start-up expense, or a carrying on expense. If there is a substantial difference between the activities of the occupations of the taxpayer, then they are considered to be separate trades or businesses, and the expenses for the new trade or business activity are not deductible under 162(a).

== Trade or business ==
Finally, the expense must also be paid or incurred in carrying on the taxpayer's trade or business. These words are defined in the code under section 7701 (a)(26) Trade or Business: The term trade or business" includes the performance of the functions of a public office. The United States Supreme Court held that "to be engaged in a trade or business, the taxpayer must be involved in the activity with continuity and regularity and that the taxpayer's primary purpose for engaging in the activity must be for income or profit. . . . A sporadic activity, a hobby, or an amusement does not qualify." In deciding if an activity is a trade or business, the taxpayer should consider if he/she devoted his full-time exertions to that activity on a regular, continuous and substantial basis. Additionally, the United States Tax Court has held that some expenses, such as payments to a prostitute, are so "inherently personal" that they cannot be deducted as business expenses, even if they are related to the taxpayer's occupation.

More information can be found on how to determine if the taxpayer's expenditures are for carrying on his trade or business by examining Treasury Regulation 1.183-2.

== Application ==
The following are some examples of types of expenses that may be deducted as a business expense: repairs to a damaged office conference table, an annual premium for personal medical insurance, traveling expenses solely related to business, and advertising expenses. The cost to keep a jet on 24-hour standby for business needs was found deductible in Palo Alto Town & Country Village, Inc. v. Commissioner. By contrast the purchase of a new computer for a business would not be a deductible expense; instead, because a computer is an asset, the cost incurred would be capitalized and then deducted over a period of years as depreciation expense, unless a special election (such as a section 179 election) is made.

== See also ==
- Commissioner v. Groetzinger
- Estate of Rockefeller v. Commissioner
- INDOPCO, Inc. v. Commissioner
- Midland Empire Packing Company v. Commissioner
- Pevsner v. Commissioner
- Sibla v. Commissioner
- Public policy limitation on deduction for business expenses
