= Internal Revenue Code section 1041 =

Section 1041 of the Internal Revenue Code (26 U.S.C. § 1041) addresses transfers of property between spouses or incident to divorce.

== General Rule ==
The general rule in § 1041(a) is that no gain or loss shall be recognized on a transfer of property from an individual to a spouse; or a transfer of property to a former spouse if the transfer is incident to the divorce. This rule also applies on a transfer of property from a trust for the benefit of a spouse or former spouse if the transfer is incident to the divorce. For the purposes of this subsection, § 1041(c) states a transfer of property is incident to divorce if such a transfer either occurs within 1 year after the date on which the marriage ends, or is related to the end of the marriage.

== Transferee's Basis ==
Where there is a transfer of property between spouses or a transfer incident to divorce, §1041(b) states that the property will be treated as if the person who receives the property (the transferee) has acquired it by gift. The transferee's basis in the property shall be the adjusted basis of the transferor at the time of the transfer. Transfers in trust where liability exceeds basis per § 1041(e) are not addressed here.

== Special Rule ==
Where the spouse-transferee is a nonresident alien, the Code states that the general rule in 1041(a) does not apply.
