= Midland Empire Packing Co. v. Commissioner =

Midland Empire Packing Company v. Commissioner
- Court: United States Tax Court
- Full case name: Midland Empire Packing Company v. Commissioner of Internal Revenue
- Decided: April 19, 1950
- Citation: 14 T.C. 635

Court membership
- Judge sitting: Arundell

Case opinions
- The Tax Court found that the taxpayer could deduct the cost of lining the walls in the basement of his business to prevent oil from seeping in because, in doing so, the taxpayer did not add value to his business but merely returned it to its original useful value.

Laws applied
- Internal Revenue Code

Midland Empire Packing Company v. Commissioner, 14 T.C. 635 (1950), was a case in which the United States Tax Court ruled that Midland Empire Packing Company was permitted to deduct the costs of lining its basement walls and floor. The costs were held to be repairs, and thus deductible as an ordinary and necessary business expense under section 162(a) of the Internal Revenue Code.

== Facts ==
The petitioner, Midland Empire Packing Company (Midland), was the owner of a meat-packing plant in the State of Montana.

The basement rooms of Midland's plant were used for the curing of hams and bacon and for the storage of meat and hides. The original concrete walls and floors were not sealed against water. When the water in the nearby Yellowstone River was high, the underground water caused increase seepage in the plant.

Also near the plant was an oil refinery owned by The Yale Oil Corporation. In 1943 Midland discovered that oil from the refinery was seeping into Midland's water wells and the basement. The oil emitted a strong odor and created a fire hazard. Federal meat inspectors advised Midland that their options were to oilproof the basement and discontinue the use of the water wells, or shut down the plant.

Midland had the basement walls sealed by independent contractors in the fiscal year ended November 30, 1943, at a cost of $4,868.81. The petitioner paid for the work during that year.

On its tax returns for 1943, Midland deducted the $4,868.81 amount it paid for repairs on the theory, inter alia, it was an ordinary and necessary business expense under section 23(a) [now 162(a)] of the Internal Revenue Code.

The Internal Revenue Commissioner concluded that the cost of oilproofing was a non-deductible capital improvement to the business and should be recovered through depreciation charges.

The petitioner challenged the Commissioner's finding in The United States Tax Court.

== Opinion of the Court ==
In an opinion by Judge Arundell, the U.S. Tax Court held that the expenditure of $4,868.81 for lining the basement walls and floor was a repair and therefore was deductible as an ordinary and necessary business expense.

In the opinion, Arundell pointed out that Midland made the repairs in question in order that it might continue to operate its plant. Not only was there danger of fire from the oil and fumes, but the presence of the oil led the Federal meat inspectors to declare the basement an unsuitable place for the purpose for which it had been used for a quarter of a century. The expenditure served only to permit petitioner to continue the use of the plant, and particularly the basement, for its normal operations.

Deductible Expense vs. Capital Improvement

The IRS, courts, and taxpayers have historically found it difficult to draw a discernible line between those costs which constitute deductible ordinary and necessary expenses and which expenditures must be capitalized instead of deducted. The court cited Illinois Merchants Trust Co., Executor, where it found that a "repair is an expenditure for the purpose of keeping the property in an ordinarily efficient operating condition. It does not add to the value of the property nor does it appreciably prolong its life." On the other hand, depreciable capital expenditures are those "for replacements, alterations, improvements, or additions which prolong the life of the property, increase its value, or make it adaptable to a different use."

The court found that Midland's expenditures made to oil-proof the basement were deductible ordinary and necessary expenses. Critical to the decision was that "[a]fter the expenditures were made, the plant did not operate on a changed or larger scale, nor was it thereafter suitable for new or additional uses." Instead, the oil-proofing merely allowed Midland to continue its original operations.

Expenditure was Necessary

The Commissioner conceded that the expenditures were "necessary" within the meaning of 23(a).

Expenditure was Ordinary

The Commissioner argued that the expenditure was not "ordinary" within the meaning of section 23(a).

Judge Arundell, in rejecting this argument, quoted Welch v. Helvering, noting that "ordinary in this context does not mean that the payments must be habitual or normal in the sense that the same taxpayer will have to make them often. The expense is an ordinary one because we know from experience that payments for such a purpose, whether the amount is large or small, are the common and accepted means of defense against attack". The situation may be unique to the individual affected, but it may not be unique to the life of the group, the community, of which he is a part.

Thus, in Arundell's view, even if the basement sealing expense was not ordinary in the sense that it was unique expense in the life of Midland as an individual, it still could be "ordinary" within the meaning of 23(a) because taking steps to protect a business from the seepage of oil to protect one's property was a common, normal thing for businesses to do in general.
