= Treasury Regulation 1.183-2 =

Treasury Regulation 1.183-2 is a Treasury Regulation in the United States, outlining the taxes owed from income deriving from non-business, non-investment activity. Expenses relating to for profit activities, such as business and investment activities, are generally tax deductible under sections 162 and 212, respectively, of the Internal Revenue Code. However, expenses relating to not for profit activities, such as hobbies, are generally not tax deductible.

== Treasury Regulation § 1.183-2 ==
Treasury Regulation 1.183-2(a) defines activity not engaged in for profit as "any activity other than one with respect to which deductions are allowable for the taxable year under section 162 (business expenses) or under paragraph (1) or (2) of section 212 (investment expenses)." While this definition tells the reader nothing more than not for profit activity means non-business and non-investment activity, subsection (b) of Regulation 1.183-2 provides 9 factors which may be used to determine whether an activity is, or is not, for profit:

1. The manner in which the taxpayer carries on the activity: If the activity is carried on "in a business like manner and maintains complete and accurate books and records" it is indicative of the activity being for profit.
2. The expertise of the taxpayer or his advisors: "Preparation for the activity by extensive study of its accepted business, economic, and scientific practices, or consultation with those who are experts therein, may indicate that the taxpayer has a profit motive where the taxpayer carries on the activity in accordance with such practices."
3. The time and effort expended by the taxpayer in carrying on the activity: If a taxpayer devotes a significant amount of time to the activity, it indicates the activity is for profit. The fact that a taxpayer does not devote a significant amount of time to the activity does not adversely affect the for profit determination so long as the taxpayer "employs competent and qualified persons to carry on such activity."
4. Expectation that assets used in activity may appreciate in value: If the taxpayer expects to profit from the activity, this indicates it is for profit.
5. The success of the taxpayer in carrying on other similar or dissimilar activities: "The fact that the taxpayer has engaged in similar activities in the past and converted them from unprofitable to profitable enterprises may indicate that he is engaged in the present activity for profit, even though the activity is presently unprofitable."
6. The taxpayer's history of income or losses with respect to the activity: "Where losses continue to be sustained beyond the period which customarily is necessary to bring the operation to profitable status, such losses, if not explainable, as due to customary business risks or reverses, may be indicative" that the activity is not for profit. "A series of years in which net income was realized would of course be strong evidence that the activity is engaged in for profit."
7. The amount of occasional profits, if any, which are earned: "Substantial profit, though only occasional, would generally be indicative that an activity is engaged in for profit, where the investment or losses are comparatively small." Also, "an opportunity to earn a substantial profit in a highly speculative venture is ordinarily sufficient to indicate that the activity is engaged in for profit."
8. The financial status of the taxpayer: "The fact that the taxpayer does not have substantial income or capital from sources other than the activity may indicate that an activity is engaged in for profit."
9. Elements of personal pleasure or recreation: "The presence of personal motives in carrying on of an activity may indicate that the activity is not engaged in for profit... It is not, however, necessary that an activity be engaged in with the exclusive intention of deriving a profit."

With regard to these 9 factors, section 1.183-2(b) stresses that "no one factor is determinative" as to whether or not an activity is engaged in for profit, and that a determination cannot be made simply because the factors indicating a for profit activity outnumber the factors indicating a not for profit activity, or vice versa. Section 1.183-2(b) also emphasizes that this list of 9 factors is not exhaustive, so that "in determining whether an activity is engaged in for profit, all facts and circumstances with respect to the activity are to be taken into account."

== Hobby activities ==
Hobby activities are activities undertaken not for profit motives but for personal pleasure. Under Internal Revenue Code Section 165, "losses of property not connected with a trade or business or a transaction entered into for profit" are not deductible except upon a casualty or theft. In addition, the general rule under Section 183(a) of the Internal Revenue Code does not allow a deduction for an activity that is not engaged in for profit. However, Section 183(b) allows two types of deductions attributable to a hobby: (1) deductions that would be allowable to the taxpayer in a taxable year whether or not such activity is engaged in for profit, and (2) deductions that would be allowable to the taxpayer if the activity were engaged in for profit, but only to the extent that the income from the activity exceeds the deductions allowable by the first type of deduction.

=== Definition and profit motive ===
Section 183(c) of the Internal Revenue Code defines an activity not engaged in for profit as "any activity other than one with respect to which deductions are allowable for the taxable year." Thus, a hobby activity is an activity other than a business or investment activity. Under Section 183(d) of the Internal Revenue Code, the presumption of a profit motive is created when the activity has been profitable for three or more of the past five most recent taxable years, including the year at issue.

=== A third type of deduction ===
Treasury Regulation Section 1.183-1(b)(1)(iii) adds a third type of deduction for hobby activities. Section 1.183-1(b)(1)(iii), permits the deduction of "amounts otherwise allowable as deductions for the taxable year which result in an adjustment to the basis of property" used in the hobby activity. Such deductions include "depreciation, partial losses with respect to property, partially worthless debts, amortization, and amortizable bond premium."

== Other considerations: the Prieto case ==
In Prieto v. Commissioner, the United States Tax Court used the factors listed in Treas. Reg. section 1.183-2 to determine whether the activity at issue in that case was one "engaged in for profit."

=== Facts ===
Dr. Prieto was an orthopedic surgeon, and ran his own successful medical practice. Mrs. Prieto also worked in her husband's medical practice. The taxpayers and their daughters thoroughly enjoyed horses, and, starting in 1991, they engaged in a horse activity under the name Fordham Farms that included purchasing, training, showing, and selling "hunter," "jumper," and "equitation" horses. Before starting the horse activity, the Prietos spoke with veterinarians, trainers, and other owners, read periodicals, and attended seminars and clinics. The Prietos also hired a horse trainer. In 1993, they hired Nicole Shahinian to ride their horses. Even though Shahinian had no experience as a trainer or in running a business, petitioners promoted her to trainer shortly thereafter. The Prietos also hired an assistant trainer, veterinarian, bookkeeper, and accountant. During the horse activity, the taxpayers never developed a written business plan or made a budget. Also, they insured only some of their horses and failed to collect debts. From 1991 to 1998, the Prietos reported substantial losses from the horse activity in every year but 1996.

=== Reasoning ===
The court concluded that "section 183(a) provides generally that, if an activity is not engaged in for profit, no deduction attributable to such activity shall be allowed except as provided in section 183(b)." Furthermore, "section 183(c) defines an 'activity not engaged in for profit' as 'any activity other than one with respect to which deductions are allowable for the taxable year under section 162 or…section 212.'" According to the court, for a deduction to be allowed under section 162 or section 212, a taxpayer must establish that he engaged in the activity with the "primary, predominant, or principal purpose and intent of realizing an economic profit independent of tax savings." While the expectation of profit need not be reasonable, the expectation must be bona fide. The court then balanced the factors stated in section 1.183-2(b).

The court found that the Prietos hired professionals to keep the books and care for the horses, but that the records were often incomplete. Furthermore, even though the taxpayers reported substantial losses, they never developed a written business plan or made a budget. According to the court, "A record of substantial losses over several years may be indicative of the absence of a profit motive." The Prietos did not attempt to collect debts owed to them, and decided which horses to buy and sell based upon which horses their daughters wanted. The court concluded that the taxpayers spoke with a number of professionals before starting the horse activity but received no useful advice. Furthermore, the taxpayers provided no significant experience to the venture, and there was no evidence to support assertions of the amount of time and effort spent on the horse activity. Finally, the absence of personal pleasure or recreation relating to the activity may indicate the presence of a profit objective, but the Prietos derived substantial amounts of pleasure from the horse activity.

=== Holding ===
The taxpayers' primary, predominant, or principal motive for engaging in the horse activity was not for profit. As a result, they could not deduct the activity from their income taxes.

=== Significance ===
The significance of the Prieto case and Treas. Reg. 1.183-2 is best understood in the context of the methods employed by Congress to curtail the tax avoidance schemes commonly referred to as tax shelters. Tax shelters generate losses that are used to offset ordinary income. The taxpayer values the tax shelter precisely because it generates losses and deductions from gross income above the line. This outcome contradicts the policies that underlie the deduction for Trade or Business Expenses pursuant to IRC § 62(a)(1). Deducting losses generated by hobby activities is just one way that aggressive taxpayers try to reduce their income tax liability by creating activities that satisfy the letter but not the spirit of the law.

Prieto provides an excellent example of the Tax Court's considerations and methods in balancing the factors listed in Treas. Reg. 1.183-2(b) and outlined in this article above. The case reveals the ambiguity of many of the factors contained in this provision, as well as the importance of the treasury regulation in considering hobby activities. Furthermore, according to the court:

- A record of substantial losses over several years may indicate the absence of a profit motive.
- A history of losses tends to negate the impression that the activity was operated for a profit.
- If the taxpayer realizes substantial income from sources other than the hobby activity, such income may indicate that the activity is not engaged in for profit.
- If the activity generates personal pleasure or recreation, a profit objective may not exist.

== See also ==
- Income tax
- Tax shelter
- Tax avoidance
- Internal Revenue Code section 61
