= Inaja Land Co. v. Commissioner =

- Court: United States Tax Court
- Full case name: Inaja Land Company, Ltd. v. Commissioner of Internal Revenue
- Decided: October 21, 1947
- Citation: 9 T.C. 727

Court membership
- Judge sitting: James Russell Leech

Case opinions
- Decision by: Leech

Laws applied
- Internal Revenue Code

Inaja Land Co., Ltd. v. Commissioner, 9 T.C. 727 (1947) was a United States income tax case which discussed whether, and how much, basis the taxpayer could recover to offset a gain from compensation from the government for an easement on his land. HELD:

1. The $50,000 that petitioner received from the City -- for a right of way and an easement on taxpayer's land, and releasing the city from all claims and demands, etc. -- was lost (present) capital rather than lost (future) profits; i.e. it should be chargeable to the capital account for land, rather than treated as taxable income under I.R.C. § 22(a) [today § 61(a)].
2. Since, under the circumstances, it was practically impossible to allocate a basis to the easements granted, entirety of the net amount received will be recovered from that basis.

== Facts ==
In 1928, the taxpayer paid $61,000 for 1,236 acres (5.00 km^{2}) of land on the Owens River. In 1934, the City diverted polluted waters upstream from the taxpayer's property, adversely affecting the fishing on the taxpayer's property and causing flooding and erosion. The city settled with the taxpayer for $50,000; net of legal fees, taxpayer's gain was $49,000.

== Issues ==
Does the $49,000 constitute taxable income under Section 61(a), or is it chargeable to the taxpayer's capital account? If the latter, how much basis should be recovered?

== Holding and Decision ==
The Tax Court held that the payment was return of capital rather than lost profits. It should be chargeable to the taxpayer's capital account, as a reduction of the taxpayer's cost basis. Because the recovery did not exceed the basis of the property, it was not yet taxable.

Agreeing with the taxpayer that it is impracticable to accurately apportion a basis to the easements, the entirety of the net amount received will be reduced from that basis.

== Academic Commentary ==
How much basis should be recovered from an easement? -- Three different cost recovery methods each has something to recommend it:

1) treat easement as leasehold (analogizing the award to dividends/rent, since land, like stock, is perpetual):

- postpone recovery of any costs until ultimate sale: the remaining land retains its basis until eventual sale, and the award is fully taxed.
- leasehold cases-- see Commissioner v. Gillette Motor Transport, Inc., 364 U.S. 130 (1960), Hort v. Commissioner, 313 U.S. 28 (1941)

2) treat easement as unit sale of a section of land (since the easement is perpetual, and represents a forced divestment of the taxpayer's original property)

- recover only the cost properly allocable to the fraction sold (even if the sale made the unsold land less attractive: that would just impact the basis of what remains.)

3) treat easement as open-ended installment sale or a down payment on the final purchase price (which today is uncertain)

- recover costs out of the earliest proceeds of disposition -- the basis of the remaining land is diminished accordingly.
- Inaja held this way: since properly allocating proceeds to easement would require an appraisal of the remaining land.)
