= Burroughs v. United States =

- Supreme Court of the United States

Argued December 5, 1933 Decided January 8, 1934
- Full case name: Burroughs and Cannon v. United States
- Citations: 290 U.S. 534 (more) 54 S. Ct. 287; 78 L. Ed. 484; 1934 U.S. LEXIS 454

Case history
- Prior: On appeal from the U.S. Court of Appeals for the District of Columbia

Holding
- Incorporation by description may be considered in determining the adequacy of conspiracy and substantive counts; Federal Corrupt Practices Act of 1925 is not in violation of the Federal Constitution, Art. II. 1

Court membership
- Chief Justice Charles E. Hughes Associate Justices Willis Van Devanter · James C. McReynolds; Louis Brandeis · George Sutherland; Pierce Butler · Harlan F. Stone; Owen Roberts · Benjamin N. Cardozo

Case opinions
- Majority: Sutherland, joined by Hughes, Van Devanter, Brandeis, Butler, Stone, Roberts, Cardozo
- Dissent: McReynolds

Laws applied
- Federal Corrupt Practices Act, 2 U.S.C. § 241; U.S. Const. art. II, § 1, cl. 2

Burroughs v. United States, 290 U.S. 534 (1934), was a United States Supreme Court case in which the Court upheld as constitutional the financial disclosure and reporting requirements of the Federal Corrupt Practices Act. The court also held that certain counts incorporated by description in other counts of an indictment may be considered in determining the adequacy of the original certain counts.

== Background ==
The Federal Corrupt Practices Act (FCPA) as amended in 1925 required political election committees to keep a detailed account of all contributions made to or by the committee. The treasurer of the committee must then file the accounts with the clerk of the United States House of Representatives.

James Cannon Jr. was the chairman, and Ada L. Burroughs the treasurer, of a political election committee from July 22, 1928, to March 16, 1929. During that time, the committee accepted contributions and made expenditures to influence the election of presidential and vice presidential electors in two states. They agreed that they would not file the requisite reports. Cannon, a powerful lobbyist, was investigated by Congress, and found in violation of the FCPA.

A grand jury returned an indictment with 11 counts against Burroughs and Cannon. The first eight counts alleged a substantive violation of the Act, but poorly described the crimes. A ninth count against Burroughs more specifically alleged a violation of the Act. A tenth count made a conspiracy charge against Cannon based on the ninth charge.

Cannon and Burroughs claimed that each count of the indictment failed to allege an offense under the FCPA, and that the FCPA violated Article II, Section 1 of the United States Constitution

The district court found all 11 counts of the indictment to be imperfect, rendering judgment on the constitutional violation moot. The court of appeals reversed, finding that the ninth count was specific enough to charge Burroughs with conspiracy. The incorporation by reference of the ninth count by the other counts was sufficient to perfect the remaining counts. It also ruled that the FCPA was not unconstitutional. The defendants appealed to the Supreme Court.

== Opinion of the Court ==
=== Majority ===
Justice George Sutherland, writing for the majority, argued that the ninth charge contained enough information to uphold all 10 counts in the indictment. The majority did find that there was a failure in the first eight counts to charge an offense under the statute. However, the ninth count was described sufficiently. Since the first eight counts referenced the ninth count, that was enough to indict the two individuals. Although the tenth count (conspiracy, against Cannon) was imperfect on its own, it, too, referenced the ninth count. That, the court held, was sufficient to save the tenth count.

Regarding the constitutionality of the Act, the court held that Congress has the power to pass legislation to protect the integrity of the federal election process.

While presidential electors are not officers or agents of the federal government (In re Green, 134 U.S. 377, 379), they exercise federal functions under, and discharge duties in virtue of authority conferred by, the Constitution of the United States. The President is vested with the executive power of the nation. The importance of his election and the vital character of its relationship to and effect upon the welfare and safety of the whole people cannot be too strongly stated. To say that Congress is without power to pass appropriate legislation to safeguard such an election from the improper use of money to influence the result is to deny to the nation in a vital particular the power of self protection. Congress, undoubtedly, possesses that power, as it possesses every other power essential to preserve the departments and institutions of the general government from impairment or destruction, whether threatened by force or by corruption.

=== Dissent ===
Justice James Clark McReynolds, however issued a stinging dissent regarding the court's ruling regarding the indictment. He argued that the court should have dismissed nine of the 10 counts.

Thus, we have allegations of what are called conspiracies to commit crimes which are nowhere adequately described. And I cannot think that such pleading should find toleration in any criminal action. An indictment ought to set out with fair certainty the charge to which the accused must respond. If crime has been committed, a fairly capable prosecuting officer can definitely describe it.

McReynolds argued that the disagreement existed between the district court and court of appeals justified a refusal to uphold the indictment.

Here, we have an example of what seems to me inordinate difficulty unnecessarily thrust upon the accused. An experienced trial judge was unable to find proper description of crime in any of the ten counts of the indictment. The Court of Appeals, with a judge of long service dissenting, ruled that every count was sufficient. This Court, being divided, now declares eight of the counts bad, but holds that two are sufficient. Surely, such contrariety of opinion concerning allegations of the indictment indicates plainly enough that no man should be required to go to trial under it.
