= 475 fund =

Type of hedge fund under U.S. tax law

In United States tax law, a section 475(f) fund is a hedge fund that elects to mark to market all its unrealized gains and losses, as allowed by the provisions of section 475(f) of the Internal Revenue Code. This can lead to a much faster recognition of gain, but also lessens the tax fees due to the high cost of performing the appropriate analysis for a non-475 fund.
