= Internal Revenue Code section 3401 =

Section 3401 (26 U.S.C. § 3401) of the Internal Revenue Code of the United States of America gives the definitions pertaining to Wage Withholding.

These definitions provide guidelines to help IRS employees and Taxpayers in understanding the Internal Revenue Code.

IRS regulation 3401 defines the terms used in regard to wage withholding only.
