= Turner v. Commissioner =

United States Tax Court case

- Court: United States Tax Court
- Full case name: Reginald Turner and Marie Terrell Turner v. Commissioner of Internal Revenue
- Decided: May 13, 1954
- Citations: T.C. Memo 1954-38; 13 T.C.M. (CCH) 462 (1954)

Court membership
- Judge sitting: J. Edgar Murdock

Case opinions
- Decision by: Murdock

Laws applied
- Internal Revenue Code

Keywords
- Lottery

Turner v. Commissioner, T.C. Memo 1954-38 (T.C. 1954) was a United States Tax Court case, concerning the proper valuation for tax purposes of lottery winnings.

== Background ==
=== Prize won ===
Reginald Turner won 2 first class steamship tickets from New York City to Buenos Aires on a radio call-in show. His name had been selected by chance from a telephone book, he was called on the telephone on April 18, 1948 and was asked to name a song that was being played on a radio program. He gave the correct name of the song and then was given the opportunity to identify a second song and thus to compete for a grand prize. He correctly identified the second song and in consideration of his efforts was awarded a number of prizes, including two round trip first-class steamship tickets for a cruise between New York City and Buenos Aires. The prize was to be one ticket if the winner was unmarried, but, if he was married, his wife was to receive a ticket also. The tickets were not transferable and were good only within one year on a sailing date approved by the agent of the steamship company.

=== Exchanged prize ===
Marie, his wife, was born in Brazil. The petitioners had two sons. Reginald negotiated with the agent of the steamship company, as a result of which he surrendered his rights to the two first-class tickets, and upon payment of $12.50 received four round trip tourist steamship tickets between New York City and Rio de Janeiro. The petitioners and their two sons used those tickets in making a trip from New York City to Rio de Janeiro and return during 1948.

The award of the tickets to Reginald represented income to him in the amount of $1,400.

=== Tax return/issues ===
In their joint return for 1948 with the collector of internal revenue for the District of North Carolina, the Turners reported the award of the two tickets as $520 worth of income. The Commissioner, in determining the deficiency, increased the income from this source to $2,220, the retail price of such tickets.

The question for decision was the amount which should be included in income: the retail price of the tickets won, or the amount at the Turners reported the award.

== Opinion of the court ==
Persons desiring to buy round trip first-class tickets between New York and Buenos Aires in April 1948, similar to those to which the petitioners were entitled, would have had to pay $2,220 for them. The petitioners, however, were not such persons. The winning of the tickets did not provide them with something which they needed in the ordinary course of their lives and for which they would have made an expenditure in any event, but merely gave them an opportunity to enjoy a luxury otherwise beyond their means. Their value to the petitioners was not equal to their retail cost. They were not transferable and not salable and there were other restrictions on their use. But even had the petitioner been permitted to sell them, his experience with other more salable articles indicates that he would have had to accept substantially less than the cost of similar tickets purchased from the steamship company and would have had selling expenses. Probably the petitioners could have refused the tickets and avoided the tax problem. Nevertheless, in order to obtain such benefits as they could from winning the tickets, they actually took a cruise accompanied by their two sons, thus obtaining free board, some savings in living expenses, and the pleasure of the trip. It seems proper that a substantial amount should [*4] be included in their income for 1948 on account of the winning of the tickets. The problem of arriving at a proper fair figure for this purpose is difficult. The evidence to assist is meager, perhaps unavoidably so. The Court, under such circumstances, must arrive at some figure and has done so. Cf. Cohan v. Commissioner, 39 Fed. (2d) 540.
