= Zaninovich v. Commissioner =

US court case

- Court: United States Court of Appeals for the Ninth Circuit
- Full case name: Martin J. and Margaret M. Zaninovich and Vincent M. and Dorothy F. Zaninovich v. Commissioner of Internal Revenue
- Decided: April 3, 1980
- Citations: 616 F.2d 429; 80-1 USTC (CCH) ¶ 9342

Case history
- Prior history: 69 T.C. 605 (1978)

Court membership
- Judges sitting: J. Clifford Wallace, Anthony Kennedy, Warren J. Ferguson

Case opinions
- Majority: Ferguson, joined by Wallace, Kennedy

Laws applied
- Internal Revenue Code

Zaninovich v. Commissioner, 616 F.2d 429 (9th Cir. 1980), is a United States court case about the deductibility of advance payments for tax purposes.

== Issue presented ==
Whether a rental payment by a cash basis taxpayer for a lease year that extended eleven months beyond the year of payment is fully deductible in the year of payment as an ordinary and necessary business expense or must be deducted on a prorated basis as a capital expenditure.

== Facts ==
Martin and Vincent Zaninovich were partners in a farming business in San Joaquin Valley in California and used the cash basis method of accounting. The partnership entered into a lease of farm land from December 1, 1973, to November 30, 1993. Yearly rent of $27,000 for the period running December 1 to November 30 was payable on December 20 of each lease year. On December 20, 1973, the partnership paid $27,000 in rent for the lease year running December 1, 1973 to November 30, 1974. The partnership deducted this entire amount on its return for the taxable year 1973.

The Tax Commissioner disallowed $24,934 of the $27,000 payment—the portion of the rent payment attributed to the eleven months rental period that fell in 1974. The United States Tax Court upheld this ruling. The 9th Circuit reversed. On appeal, the court concluded that the test for determining if this rental prepayment could be fully deducted during the actual payment year (thus whether the payment was a deductible expense or a capital expenditure) depended on whether or not eleven months is "substantially beyond" the taxable year. The court decided to adopt the "one-year rule" applied by several circuits in distinguishing between currently deductible expenses and capital expenditures having a useful life extending "substantially beyond" the tax year. Under the "one year rule", an expenditure is treated as a capital expenditure if it creates an asset, or secures a like advantage to the taxpayer, having a useful life in excess of one year. The court reasoned that the overriding advantage to the "one year rule" was its ease of application. Additionally the rule eliminates pointless complexity in the calculation of the timing of deductions.

The court found that its reasoning for the "one year rule" was well illustrated by the facts of the case before it. If the taxpayers in this situation were forced to deduct their rental payments on a prorated basis, the simplicity of the cash basis method of accounting was sacrificed for an inconsequential change in the timing of deductions. Under the prorated system the taxpayers could only deduct 1/12 of their rental payment in 1973. But in 1974, and every year until 1992, the taxpayers would be able to deduct both 1/12 of the current payment (for the month of December) and 11/12 for the preceding year's payment that covered the rental period in the current tax year (January–November); thus the taxpayers would be deducting 12/12 of rental payment—an entire year's worth of payments. So there was only a difference between the prorated deduction system and the "one-year rule" for the first and last year of the lease term.

== Holding ==
The court adopted the "one year rule" and payment in this case was fully deductible in the year of payment.
