= Estate of Carter v. Commissioner =

United States Federal income tax legal case

Estate of Sydney J. Carter v. Commissioner of Internal Revenue
- Court: United States Court of Appeals for the Second Circuit
- Full case name: Estate of Sydney J. Carter, Deceased (a/k/a Sydney J. Canter), et al. v. Commissioner of Internal Revenue
- Argued: November 9, 1971
- Decided: December 14, 1971
- Citations: 453 F.2d 61; 72-1 USTC (CCH) ¶ 9129

Case history
- Prior history: 29 CCH Tax Ct. Mem. 1407 (1970)

Court membership
- Judges sitting: Henry Friendly, Wilfred Feinberg, Oscar Hirsh Davis (U.S. Court of Claims, sitting by designation)

Case opinions
- Majority: Friendly, joined by Feinberg, Davis

Laws applied
- Internal Revenue Code § 101(b)(2)(A)

Estate of Sydney J. Carter v. Commissioner of Internal Revenue, 453 F.2d 61 (2d Cir. 1971), was a United States Federal income tax case decided by Judge Henry Friendly of the Second Circuit Court.

== Facts ==
Dorothy T. Carter, the widow of Sydney J. Carter, was the taxpayer and appellant in the case. Mrs. Carter had been paid by Mr. Carter's employer what he would have earned until the end of the fiscal year. Mrs. Carter did not include that amount as income on a joint return she filed. The joint return for 1960 filed by Mrs. Carter as executrix and for herself did not report as income the payments of $60,130.84, although it did report as capital gain a payment of $52,337.68, less the deduction of $5,000 permitted by I.R.C. § 101(b)(2)(A) (26 U.S.C. § 101(b)(2)(A)), from the trustees of the Salomon Bros. Profit Sharing Plan, which represented the amounts accumulated for Sydney Carter's benefit during his years of service.

The Commissioner assessed a deficiency for failure to include the former amount. The Commissioner's assessment was sustained by the United States Tax Court. Mrs. Carter appealed to the Court of Appeals for the Second Circuit.

== Opinion of the court ==
The court of appeals reversed. The court noted that, in proceedings in United States district courts, payments to a survivor that had not been specifically characterized as compensation were consistently held to be gifts, except when the corporation was dominated by the decedent's family or there was a plan for making such payments. The court held that the test that applied was that of principal motive. The court noted that in this case, the gift was made to the widow rather than to the estate; the corporation had no obligation to make further payments to deceased; the widow had never worked for the corporation; the corporation received no economic benefit; and the deceased had been fully compensated for his services. It was error for a partner's statement that the payment was a gift to be regarded as of only slight probative value because a declaration about intention by a person with knowledge was not excludable simply because it was made after the fact.

The court was left with the definite and firm conviction that the tax court committed a mistake in finding that the payments were compensation rather than an excludable gift.
