= Welch v. Helvering =

- Supreme Court of the United States

Argued October 19, 1933 Decided November 6, 1933
- Full case name: Thomas Welch v. Guy T. Helvering, Commissioner of Internal Revenue
- Citations: 290 U.S. 111 (more) 54 S. Ct. 8; 78 L. Ed. 212

Holding
- Welch's repayments of his discharged debts were not ordinary and necessary business expenses, and therefore not deductible under § 162 of the Internal Revenue Code.

Court membership
- Chief Justice Charles E. Hughes Associate Justices Willis Van Devanter · James C. McReynolds; Louis Brandeis · George Sutherland; Pierce Butler · Harlan F. Stone; Owen Roberts · Benjamin N. Cardozo

Case opinion
- Majority: Cardozo, joined by unanimous

Laws applied
- Internal Revenue Code § 162(a)

Welch v. Helvering, 290 U.S. 111 (1933), was a decision by the United States Supreme Court on the difference between business and personal expenses and the difference between ordinary business deductions and capital expenses. It is one of the most important income tax law cases.

== Background ==
Thomas Welch and his father owned a grain brokerage business in Minnesota, which went bankrupt in 1922. Welch later reopened a business. He chose to repay his discharged debts. He then tried to deduct the repayments as business expenses, but the Commissioner ruled that these payments were not deductible from income as ordinary and necessary expenses in the course of business.

== Opinion of the Court ==
Benjamin N. Cardozo, delivering the Court's opinion, held that the expenses were too personal, were too bizarre to be ordinary, and were capital. He did not consider them "ordinary and necessary business expenses" and, therefore, not deductible under Section 162 of the Internal Revenue Code.

This case is frequently cited for its dictum describing the meaning of the term "necessary" in Section 162 as requiring that expenses merely be "appropriate and helpful [in] the development of the [taxpayer's] business." Cardozo submits that determining what constitutes a necessary expense can be enormously difficult: "life in all its fullness must supply the answer to the riddle."

The court also considered the question of whether Welch's expenses were current expenses or investments which should have been capitalized. Although the case was eventually decided on other grounds, the idea that the expenses should have increased the basis of the business as capital expenses, with no immediate deduction but the potential for depreciation losses over time may also have influenced the court.

== See also ==
- Tax Deductions in the United States
- List of United States Supreme Court cases, volume 290
