= Internal Revenue Code section 355 =

Part of the federal statutory tax law in the United States

Section 355 of the Internal Revenue Code allows a corporation to make a tax-free distribution to its shareholders of stock and securities in one or more controlled subsidiaries. If a set of statutory and judicial requirements are met, neither the distributing corporation nor its shareholders recognize gain or loss on the distribution. Therefore, it essentially becomes tax-free. The three types of corporate divisions are commonly known as spin-offs, split-offs and split-ups.

The spin-off involves a distribution of property to shareholders without the surrender of any stock, which thus resembles a dividend. The split-off resembles a redemption because the shareholders have relinquished stock of the distributing corporation.

Section 355 allows a corporation with one or more businesses that have been actively conducted for five years or more to make a tax-free distribution of the stock of a controlled subsidiary provided that the transaction is being carried out for a legitimate business purpose and is not being used principally as a device to bail out earnings and profits.

== Requirements ==
A corporate division will qualify as tax free to the shareholders and the distributing corporation if it satisfies the requirements listed:

- Control
- Distribution of All Stock or Securities
- Active Trade or Business Requirement
- Not A "Device"
- Business Purpose
- Continuity of Interest

1) The control requirement is best defined by IRC § 368(c), which requires ownership of 80 percent of the total combined voting power and 80 percent of the total number of shares of all other classes of stock, including nonvoting preferred stock.

2) The distributing corporation must distribute all the stock or securities of the controlled corporation that the distributing corporation holds or an amount of stock sufficient to constitute control under the meaning of Section 368(c).

3) According to §355(a)(1)(c), both the distributing corporation and the controlled corporation must be engaged immediately after the distribution in an actively conducted trade or business which has been so conducted throughout the five-year period ending on the date of the distribution. That business must also not have been acquired within the five-year predistribution period in a taxable transaction. The landmark case that has been used to determine active trade or business requirement is Estate of Lockwood v. Commissioner, Other relevant sources are Revenue Ruling 2002-38, which entails whether an expansion of a corporation's business constitutes a new or continuing business under Reg. 1.355-3(b)(3)(ii).

4) The mission of the device limitation has been to prevent the conversion of ordinary dividend income into preferentially taxed capital gain through a bailout seeming as a corporate division. The role of the device limitation is diminished but not eliminated now that dividends and long-term capital gains of non-corporate taxpayers are taxed at the same rate. Here are some factors that help constitute a device: 1) a pro rate distribution of the shares of the corporation; 2) a subsequent sale or exchange of stock of either corporation's stock; and 3) the nature and use of the assets of the distributing and controlled corporations immediately after the transaction.

5) A corporate division lacking a business purpose can not be accomplished tax free even if it is not used principally as a device to bail out earnings and profits. The regulations define a corporate business purpose as "a real and substantial non Federal tax purpose germane to the business of the distributing corporation, the controlled corporation or the affiliated group to which the distributing corporation belongs." Reg. 1.355-2(b)(2) This is the biggest subjective area of the 355 requirements in which case by case facts can alter the final decision on passing the requirement. Many courts have ruled favorably for the corporations while others have ruled against. This requirement is correlated with the non-device requirement by stating the stronger the business purpose of the corporation is, the less evidence of device in the purpose of the transaction. Revenue Procedure 96-30 provides some examples of advance rulings on business purpose.

6) The regulations require that those persons who owned an interest in the corporation prior to a corporate division must own an amount of stock establishing a continuity of interest. In other words, one or more shareholders of the distributing corporation must emerge from the transaction with at least fifty percent equity interest in each of the corporations that conduct the enterprise after the division. The IRS set up a fifty percent safe harbor benchmark in the meeting the continuity of interest requirement.
