= Capital expenditure =

Costs associated with 'fixed assets'

Capital expenditure or capital expense (abbreviated capex, CAPEX, or CapEx) is the money an organization or corporate entity spends to buy, maintain, or improve its fixed assets, such as buildings, vehicles, equipment or land. It is considered a capital expenditure when funds are spent to purchase a new asset or to extend the useful life of existing assets, such as major structural repairs or upgrades.

Capital expenditures contrast with operating expenses (opex)—ongoing expenses that are inherent to the operation of the asset. Opex includes items like electricity or cleaning. The difference between opex and capex may not be immediately obvious for some expenses. As an example, repaving a parking lot may be thought of inherent to the operation of a shopping mall. Similarly, the cost of software for a business (either software development, software as a service, or software licensing) might fall into either opex or capex, depending on whether it is merely business as usual, or something new (a fixed investment with multiyear return on investment). In general, the expense is considered capex if the financial benefit of the expenditure extends beyond the current fiscal year.

== Usage ==
Capital expenditures are funds used to acquire or upgrade a company’s fixed assets, such as property, plant, and equipment (PP&E). In many companies, major capital expenditures require formal approval from the board of directors, depending on corporate governance rules or internal bylaws.” In accounting, a capital expenditure is added to an asset account, thus increasing the asset's adjusted basis (the cost or value of an asset adjusted for tax purposes). Capex is commonly found on the cash flow statement under "Investment in Property, Plant, and Equipment" or a similar line item within the investing activities section.

== Accounting rules ==
For tax purposes, capex is a cost that cannot be deducted in the year in which it is paid or incurred and must be capitalized. The general rule is that if the acquired property's useful life is longer than the taxable year, then the cost must be capitalized. The capital expenditure costs are then amortized or depreciated over the life of the asset in question. Further to the above, capex creates or adds basis to the asset or property, which once adjusted, will determine tax liability in the event of sale or transfer. In the US, Internal Revenue Code §§263 and 263A deal extensively with capitalization requirements and exceptions.

Included in capital expenditures are amounts spent on:

1. acquiring fixed, and in some cases, intangible assets
2. repairing an existing asset so as to improve its useful life
3. upgrading an existing asset if it results in a superior fixture
4. preparing an asset to be used in business
5. restoring property or adapting it to a new or different use
6. starting or acquiring a new business

An ongoing question for the accounting of any company is whether certain costs incurred should be capitalized or expensed. Costs which are expensed in a particular month simply appear on the financial statement as a cost incurred that month. Costs that are capitalized, however, are amortized or depreciated over multiple years. Capitalized expenditures show up on the balance sheet. Most ordinary business costs are either expensable or capitalizable, but some costs could be treated either way, according to the preference of the company. Capitalized interest if applicable is also spread out over the life of the asset. Sometimes an organization needs to apply for a line of credit to build another asset, it can capitalize the related interest cost. Accounting standards spreads out a couple of stipulations for capitalizing interest cost. Organizations can possibly capitalize the interest given that they are building the asset themselves; they can not capitalize interest on an advance to buy the asset or pay another person to develop it. Organizations can just perceive interest cost as they acquire costs to develop the asset.

The counterpart of capital expenditure is operating expense or operational cost (opex).

== See also ==
- Operating expense (operational expenditure, opex)
- Total cost of ownership (TCO)
- Contract management software
- Capital cost
- Cash flow statement
- Income statement
- Balance sheet
- Expenses versus capital expenditures
