= Internal Revenue Code =

United States federal tax code

The Internal Revenue Code of 1986 (IRC) is the domestic portion of federal statutory tax law in the United States. It is codified in statute as Title 26 of the United States Code. The IRC is organized topically into subtitles and sections, covering federal income tax in the United States, payroll taxes, estate taxes, gift taxes, and excise taxes, as well as procedure and administration. The Internal Revenue Service (IRS), a bureau of the Department of the Treasury, is responsible for administering and enforcing the Internal Revenue Code.

== Origins of tax codes in the United States ==
Prior to 1874, U.S. statutes (whether in tax law or other subjects) were not codified. That is, the acts of Congress were not organized and published in separate volumes based on subject matter (such as taxation, bankruptcy, etc.). Codifications of statutes, including tax statutes, undertaken in 1873 resulted in the Revised Statutes of the United States, approved on June 22, 1874, and effective for the laws in force as of December 1, 1873. Title 35 of the Revised Statutes was the Internal Revenue title. Another codification was undertaken in 1878.

In 1919, a committee of the U.S. House of Representatives began a project to recodify U.S. statutes, which eventually resulted in a new United States Code in 1926, including tax statutes.

== Internal Revenue Code of 1939 ==
The tax statutes were recodified by an Act of Congress on February 10, 1939, as the "Internal Revenue Code" (later known as the "Internal Revenue Code of 1939"). The 1939 Code was published as Volume 53, Part I, of the United States Statutes at Large and as Title 26 of the United States Code. Subsequent permanent tax laws enacted by the United States Congress updated and amended the 1939 Code.

== Internal Revenue Code of 1954 ==
On August 16, 1954, in connection with a general overhaul of the Internal Revenue Service, the IRC was greatly reorganized and expanded by the 83rd United States Congress (by Chapter 736, Pub. L. 83–591). Ward M. Hussey was the principal drafter of the Internal Revenue Code of 1954. The Code was published in Volume 68A of the United States Statutes at Large. To prevent confusion with the 1939 Code, the new version was thereafter referred to as the "Internal Revenue Code of 1954" and the prior version as the "Internal Revenue Code of 1939". The lettering and numbering of subtitles, sections, etc., were completely changed. For example, Section 22 of the 1939 Code (defining gross income) was roughly analogous to Section 61 of the 1954 Code. The 1954 Code replaced the 1939 Code as Title 26 of the United States Code.

The 1954 Code temporarily extended the Revenue Act of 1951's 5-percentage-point increase in corporate tax rates through March 31, 1955, increased depreciation deductions by providing additional depreciation schedules, and created a 4% dividend tax credit for individuals.

=== Relationship to Title 26 of the United States Code ===
The Internal Revenue Code of 1954 was enacted in the form of a separate code by the Act of August 16, 1954, ch. 736, 68A Stat. 1. The Tax Reform Act of 1986 changed the name of the 1954 Code to the "Internal Revenue Code of 1986". In addition to being published in various volumes of the United States Statutes at Large, the Internal Revenue Code is separately published as Title 26 of the United States Code. The text of the Internal Revenue Code as published in Title 26 of the U.S. Code is virtually identical to the Internal Revenue Code as published in the various volumes of the United States Statutes at Large. Of the 50 enacted titles, the Internal Revenue Code is the only title that has been published as a separate code.

=== Progressivity of the 1954 Code ===
With respect to the federal income tax on individuals, the 1954 Code imposed a progressive tax rate structure with 24 marginal brackets ranging from 20% to 91%. Although the highest marginal rates exceeded 90%, various deductions, exclusions, and preferential tax treatments affected taxpayers' effective tax rates. For example, the following is a schedule showing the federal marginal income tax rate imposed on each level of taxable income for a single (unmarried) individual under the 1954 Code:

Income level	Tax rate	2024 PCE adjusted income
up to $2,000	20%	up to $17,710
$2,000–$4,000	22%	$17,710–$35,410
$4,000–$6,000	26%	$35,410–$53,120
$6,000–$8,000	30%	$53,120–$70,830
$8,000–$10,000	34%	$70,830–$88,530
$10,000–$12,000	38%	$88,530–$106,240
$12,000–$14,000	43%	$106,240–$123,950
$14,000–$16,000	47%	$123,950–$141,650
$16,000–$18,000	50%	$141,650–$159,360
$18,000–$20,000	53%	$159,360–$177,060
$20,000–$22,000	56%	$177,060–$194,770
$22,000–$26,000	59%	$194,770–$230,180
$26,000–$32,000	62%	$230,180–$283,300
$32,000–$38,000	65%	$283,300–$336,420
$38,000–$44,000	69%	$336,420–$389,540
$44,000–$50,000	72%	$389,540–$442,660
$50,000–$60,000	75%	$442,660–$531,190
$60,000–$70,000	78%	$531,190–$619,720
$70,000–$80,000	81%	$619,720–$708,260
$80,000–$90,000	84%	$708,260–$796,790
$90,000–$100,000	87%	$796,790–$885,320
$100,000–$150,000	89%	$885,320–$1,327,980
$150,000–$200,000	90%	$1,327,980–$1,770,640
$200,000 or more	91%	$1,770,640 or more

- Source: Internal Revenue Code of 1954, Pub. L. 83–591, 68A Stat. 5, enacted August 16, 1954 (modified from text of the statute).
- Source: Personal Consumption Expenditures: Chain-type Price Index

== Internal Revenue Code of 1986 ==
References in federal statutes enacted after 1954 to the Internal Revenue Code generally refer to Title 26 of the United States Code, as amended. The basic structure of Title 26 remained the same until the enactment of the comprehensive revision contained in the Tax Reform Act of 1986, although individual provisions of the law were changed on a regular basis.

Section 2 of the Tax Reform Act of 1986 provides (in part):

(a) Redesignation of 1954 Code. – The Internal Revenue Title enacted August 16, 1954, as heretofore, hereby, or hereafter amended, may be cited as the "Internal Revenue Code of 1986".
(b) References in Laws, Etc. – Except when inappropriate, any reference in any law, Executive order, or other document –

(1) to the Internal Revenue Code of 1954 shall include a reference to the Internal Revenue Code of 1986, and
(2) to the Internal Revenue Code of 1986 shall include a reference to the provisions of law formerly known as the Internal Revenue Code of 1954.

Thus, the 1954 Code was renamed the Internal Revenue Code of 1986 by Section 2 of the Tax Reform Act of 1986. The 1986 Act contained substantial amendments but no formal recodification. That is, the 1986 Code retained most of the same lettering and numbering of subtitles, chapters, subchapters, parts, subparts, sections, etc. The 1986 Code, as amended from time to time (and still published as Title 26 of the United States Code), retains the basic structure of the 1954 Code.

== Individual and corporate income tax ==
Section 1 of the Internal Revenue Code imposes the federal income tax on the taxable income of U.S. citizens and residents, and on estates and trusts. The corporate income tax is imposed by Internal Revenue Code Section 11.

== Organization ==
The organization of the Internal Revenue Code generally corresponds to the organization of Title 26 of the U.S. Code, where the code is published.

For example, section 45(b)(7)(B)(i)(I)(aa)(AA) (26 U.S.C. § 45(e)(7)(B)(i)(I)(aa)) would be as follows:

Title 26: Internal Revenue Code

- Subtitle A: Income Taxes
  - Chapter 1: Normal Taxes and Surtaxes
    - Subchapter A: Determination of Tax Liability
      - Part IV: Credits Against Tax
        - Subpart D: Business Related Credits
          - Section 45: Electricity produced from certain renewable resources, etc.
            - Subsection (b): Limitations and adjustments
              - Paragraph (7): Prevailing wage requirements
                - Subparagraph (B): Correction and penalty related to failure to satisfy wage requirements
                  - Clause (i): In general. In the case of ... such taxpayer-
                    - Subclause (I): makes payment to such laborer or mechanic in an amount equal to the sum of-
                      - Item (aa): an amount equal to the difference between-
                        - Subitem (AA): the amount of wages paid to such laborer or mechanic during such period, and

The Internal Revenue Code is organized topically and generally referred to by section number (sections 1 through 9834). Some topics are short (e.g., tax rates) and some are quite long (e.g., pension and benefit plans).

Key IRC Topics By Section:

Sections	Function
1–15	Tax rates
21–54	Credits (refundable and nonrefundable)
55–59A	Alternative Minimum Tax & environmental tax
61–90	Definition of gross income (before deductions), including items specifically taxable
101–140	Specific exclusions from gross income
141–149	Private activity bonds
151–153	Personal exemptions; dependent defined
161–199	Deductions, including interest, taxes, losses, and business related items
211–224	Itemized deductions for individuals
241–250	Deductions unique to corporations
261–291	Nondeductible items, including special rules limiting or deferring deductions
301–386	Corporate transactions, including formation, distributions, reorganizations, liquidations (Subchapter C)
401–436	Pension and benefit plans: treatment of plans, employers, & beneficiaries
441–483	Accounting methods & tax years
501–530	Exempt organizations (charitable and other)
531–565	Accumulated earnings tax and personal holding companies
581–597	Banks: special rules for certain items
611–638	Natural resources provisions: depletion, etc.
641–692	Trusts & estates: definitions, income tax on same & beneficiaries
701–777	Partnerships: definitions, treatment of entities and members, special rules (Subchapter K)
801–848	Insurance companies: special rules, definitions
851–860	Regulated investment companies (mutual funds) and Real Estate Investment Trusts
861–865	Source of income (for international tax)
871–898	Tax on foreign persons/corporations; inbound international rules
901–908	Foreign tax credit
911–943	Exclusions of foreign income (mostly repealed)
951–965	Taxation of U.S. shareholders of controlled foreign corporations (Subpart F)
971–999	Other international tax provisions
1001–1092	Gains: definitions, characterization, and recognition; special rules
1201–1298	Capital gains: separate taxation and special rules
1301–1359	Interperiod adjustments; certain special rules
1361–1388	S Corporations and cooperative associations: flow-through rules
1391–1400T	Empowerment, enterprise, and other special zones
1401–1403	Self-employment tax (like social security, below)
1441–1465	Withholding of tax on nonresidents
1501–1564	Consolidated returns and affiliated groups (corporations)
2001–2210	Estate tax on transfers at death
2501–2704	Gift tax and tax on generation skipping transfers
3101–3241	Social security and railroad retirement taxes
3301–3322	Unemployment taxes
3401–3510	Income tax withholding; payment of employment taxes
4001–5000	Excise taxes on specific goods, transactions, and industries
5001–5891	Alcohol, tobacco and firearms taxes and special excise tax rules
6001–6167	Tax returns: requirements, procedural rules, payments, settlements, extensions
6201–6533	Assessment, collection, and abatement; limitations on collection & refund
6601–6751	Interest and non-criminal penalties on underpayments or failures
6801–7124	Other procedural rules
7201–7344	Crimes, other offences, forfeitures, tax evasion
7401–7493	Judicial proceedings
7501–8023	Miscellaneous rules
9001–9834	Special taxes & funds (presidential election, highway, black lung, etc.)

== Subtitles ==
- A. Income Taxes (sections 1–1564)
  As an example, the chapters of this subtitle are:
  - Chapter 1—Normal taxes and surtaxes (sections 1–1400U3)
  - Chapter 2—Tax on self-employment income (sections 1401–1403)
  - Chapter 3—Withholding of tax on nonresident aliens and foreign corporations (sections 1441–1464)
  - Chapter 4—Taxes to enforce reporting on certain foreign accounts (sections 1471–1474)
  - Chapter 5—Repealed (sections 1491–1494)
  - Chapter 6—Consolidated returns (sections 1501–1564)
- B. Estate and Gift Taxes (sections 2001–2801)
- C. Employment Taxes (sections 3101–3510)
- D. Miscellaneous Excise Taxes (sections 4001–5000)
- E. Alcohol, Tobacco, and Certain Other Excise Taxes (sections 5001–5891)
- F. Procedure and Administration (sections 6001–7874)
- G. The Joint Committee on Taxation (sections 8001–8023)
- H. Financing of Presidential Election Campaigns (sections 9001–9042)
- I. Trust Fund Code (sections 9500–9602) ("Trust Fund Code of 1981")
- J. Coal Industry Health Benefits (sections 9701–9722)
- K. Group Health Plan Requirements (sections 9801–9834)

== List of commonly referenced sections ==
(This is not intended to be a complete list of sections.)

- Subtitle A: Income Taxes (§ 1–§ 1564)
  - Chapter 1: Normal Taxes and Surtaxes (§ 1–§ 1400U3)
    - Subchapter A: Determination of Tax Liability (§ 1–§ 59)
      - Part I: Tax on Individuals (§ 1–§ 59B)
        - Section 1: Tax imposed (§ 1)
        - ...
        - Section 41: Credit for increasing research activities (§ 41)
        - ...
    - Subchapter B: Computation of Taxable Income (§ 61–§ 291)
      - Part I: Definition of Gross Income, Adjusted Gross Income, Taxable Income, Etc. (§ 61–§ 68)
        - Section 61: Gross income defined (§ 61)
        - ...
        - Section 63: Taxable income defined (§ 63)
        - ...
      - Part II: Items Specifically Included in Gross Income (§ 71–§ 80)
        - ...
        - Section 79: Group-term life insurance purchased for employees (§ 79)
        - ...
      - Part III: Items Specifically Excluded from Gross Income (§ 101–§ 140)
        - ...
        - Section 132(a): Fringe benefits excluded from gross income (§ 132(a))
        - ...
      - Part VI: Itemized Deductions for Individuals and Corporations (§ 161–§ 198)
        - ...
        - Section 162(2): Trade or business expenses (§ 162(a))
        - ...
        - Section 179: Election to expense certain depreciable business assets (§ 179)
        - ...
        - Section 183: Activities Not Engaged in for Profit (§ 183)
        - ...
      - Part VII: Additional Itemized Deductions for Individuals (§ 211–§ 224)
        - ...
        - Section 212: Expenses for production of income (§ 212)
        - ...
    - Subchapter C: Corporate Distributions and Adjustments (§ 301–§ 385)
      - ...
      - Part III: Corporate Organizations and Reorganizations (§ 351–§ 368)
        - ...
        - Subpart B: Effects on Shareholders and Security Holders (§ 354–§ 358)
          - ...
          - Section 355: Distribution of stock and securities of a controlled corporation (§ 355)
          - ...
      - ...
    - Subchapter D: Deferred Compensation, Etc. (§ 401–§ 436)
      - Part I: Pension, Profit-sharing, Stock Bonus Plan, etc. (§ 401–§ 420)
        - Subpart A: General Rule (§ 401–§ 409A)
          - Section 401: Qualified pension, profit-sharing, and stock bonus plans
            - paragraph (a) ("401(a)"): employer-sponsored retirement plan for employees of state and local governments and certain tax-exempt entities (§ 401(a))
            - ...
            - paragraph (k) ("401(k)"): employer-sponsored retirement plan (§ 401(k))
          - ...
          - Section 402A ("Roth 401(k)"): Optional treatment of elective deferrals as Roth contributions (§ 402A)
          - Section 403: Taxation of employee annuities
            - ...
            - paragraph (b) ("403(b)"): employer-sponsored retirement plan at non-profit organizations (§ 403(b))
          - ...
          - Section 408: Individual Retirement Accounts (§ 408)
          - Section 408A: Roth IRAs (§ 408A)
          - ...
          - Section 409A: Inclusion in gross income of deferred compensation under nonqualified deferred compensation plans (§ 409A)
          - ...
    - Subchapter E: Accounting Periods and Methods of Accounting (§ 441–§ 483)
      - ...
      - Part II: Methods of Accounting (§ 446–§ 475)
        - Subpart B: Taxable Year for Which Items of Gross Income Included (§ 451–§ 460)
          - ...
          - Section 457: retirement plan for governmental and certain non governmental employers (§ 457)
          - ...
        - Subpart D: Inventories (§ 471–§ 475)
          - ...
          - Section 475: Mark to market accounting method for dealers in securities (§ 475)
        - ...
    - Subchapter F: Exempt Organizations (§ 501–§ 530)
      - Part I: General Rule (§ 501–§ 505)
        - Section 501: Exemption from tax on corporations, certain trusts, etc. (§ 501)
          - ...
          - paragraph (c) ("501(c)"): List of exempt organizations (§ 501(c))
            - subparagraph (1) ("501(c)(1)"): corporations organized under Acts of Congress such as Federal Credit Unions (§ 501(c)(1))
            - subparagraph (2) ("501(c)(2)"): title-holding corporations for exempt organizations (§ 501(c)(2))
            - subparagraph (3) ("501(c)(3)"): charitable, non-profit, religious, and educational organizations (§ 501(c)(3))
            - subparagraph (4) ("501(c)(4)"): political education organizations (§ 501(c)(4))
            - subparagraph (6) ("501(c)(6)"): business leagues and chambers of commerce (§ 501(c)(6))
            - subparagraph (7) ("501(c)(7)"): recreational clubs (§ 501(c)(7))
        - ...
      - Part VI: Political Organizations (§ 527)
        - Section 527: Political organizations (§ 527)
      - ...
      - Part VIII: Certain Savings Entities (§ 529–§ 530)
        - Section 529: Qualified tuition programs (§ 529)
        - Section 529A: ABLE accounts for benefit of certain individuals with disabilities (§ 529A)
        - Section 530: Coverdell Education Savings Accounts (§ 530)
    - ...
    - Subchapter N: Tax Based on Income From Sources Within or Without the United States (§ 861–§ 1000)
      - Part I: Source Rules and Other General Rules Relating To Foreign Income (§ 861–§ 865)
        - Section 861: Income from sources within the United States (§ 861)
        - ...
    - Subchapter O: Gain or Loss on Disposition of Property (§ 1000–§ 1111)
      - ...
      - Part III: Common Nontaxable Exchanges (§ 1031–§ 1045)
        - Section 1031: Exchange of property held for productive use or investment (§ 1031)
        - ...
        - Section 1041: Transfers of Property Between Spouses or Incident to Divorce (§ 1041)
        - ...
- Subtitle C: Employment Taxes (§ 3101–§ 3510)
  - ...
  - Chapter 24: Collection of Income Tax at Source on Wages (§ 3401–§ 3456)
    - Section 3401: Definitions (§ 3401)

== See also ==
- Boechler v. Commissioner
- Estate of Carter v. Commissioner
- Inaja Land Co. v. Commissioner
- Mazzei v. Commissioner
- SECURE Act of 2019
- Turner v. Commissioner
- Treasury regulations (Title 26 of the Code of Federal Regulations)
- Stop Terror-Financing and Tax Penalties on American Hostages Act, proposed legislation to amend the Internal Revenue Code of 1986
