= Statement of changes in equity =

Basic type of financial statement

A statement of changes in equity is one of the four basic financial statements. It is also known as the statement of changes in owner's equity for a sole trader, statement of changes in partners' equity for a partnership, statement of changes in shareholders' equity for a company, and statement of changes in taxpayers' equity for a government.

The statement explains the changes in a company's share capital, accumulated reserves and retained earnings over the reporting period. It breaks down changes in the owners' interest in the organization, and in the application of retained profit or surplus from one accounting period to the next. Line items typically include profits or losses from operations, dividends paid, issue or redemption of shares, revaluation reserve and any other items charged or credited to accumulated other comprehensive income. It also includes the non-controlling interest attributable to other individuals and organisations.

The statement is expected under the generally accepted accounting principles and explains the owners' equity shown on the balance sheet, where:

owners' equity = assets − liabilities

== Requirements of the U.S. GAAP ==
In the United States this is called a statement of retained earnings and it is required under the U.S. Generally Accepted Accounting Principles (U.S. GAAP) whenever comparative balance sheets and income statements are presented. It may appear in the balance sheet, in a combined income statement and changes in retained earnings statement, or as a separate schedule.

Therefore, the statement of retained earnings uses information from the income statement and provides information to the balance sheet.

Retained earnings are part of the balance sheet (another basic financial statement) under "stockholders equity (shareholders' equity)" and is mostly affected by net income earned during a period of time by the company less any dividends paid to the company's owners / stockholders. The retained earnings account on the balance sheet is said to represent an "accumulation of earnings" since net profits and losses are added/subtracted from the account from period to period.

Retained Earnings are part of the "Statement of Changes in Equity". The general equation can be expressed as following:

Ending Retained Earnings = Beginning Retained Earnings − Dividends Paid + Net Income

This equation is necessary to use to find the Profit Before Tax to use in the Cash Flow Statement under Operating Activities when using the indirect method. This is used whenever a comprehensive income statement is not given but only the balance sheet is given.

== Requirements of IFRS ==
IAS 1 requires a business entity to present a separate statement of changes in equity (SOCE) as one of the components of financial statements.

The statement shall show: (IAS1.106)

1. total comprehensive income for the period, showing separately amounts attributable to owners of the parent and to non-controlling interests
2. the effects of retrospective application, when applicable, for each component
3. reconciliations between the carrying amounts at the beginning and the end of the period for each component of equity, separately disclosing:

- profit or loss
- each item of other comprehensive income
- transactions with owners, showing separately contributions by and distributions to owners and changes in ownership interests in subsidiaries that do not result in a loss of control

However, the amount of dividends recognised as distributions, and the related amount per share, may be presented in the notes instead of presenting in the statement of changes in equity. (IAS1.107)

For small and medium enterprises (SMEs), the statement of changes in equity should show all changes in equity including:

- total comprehensive income
- owners' investments
- dividends
- owners' withdrawals of capital
- treasury share transactions

They can omit the statement of changes in equity if the entity has no owner investments or withdrawals other than dividends, and elects to present a combined statement of comprehensive income and retained earnings.

== Example statement ==
The following statement of changes in equity is a very brief example prepared in accordance with IFRS. It does not show all possible kinds of items, but it shows the most usual ones for a company. Because it shows Non-Controlling Interest, it's a consolidated statement.

Statement of Changes in Equity of XYZ, Ltd. As of 31 December 2015
| | Share Capital | Share Premium | Treasury Shares | Retained Earnings | Accumulated Other Comprehensive Income | | | Total shareholders funds | Non-Controlling Interest | Total |
| | Share Capital | Share Premium | Treasury Shares | Retained Earnings | Foreign-exchange reserves | Pensions Reserve | Revaluation Reserve | Total shareholders funds | Non-Controlling Interest | Total |
| At 1 January 2014 | 1,000 | 100 | 0 | 2,500 | 750 | 800 | 56 | 5,206 | 600 | 5,806 |
|---|---|---|---|---|---|---|---|---|---|---|
| Profit/(Loss) for the year | | | | 300 | | | | 300 | 30 | 330 |
| Other Comprehensive Income | | | | | 10 | 35 | 45 | 90 | 9 | 99 |
| Dividends to Shareholders @50% | | | | (150) | | | | (150) | (15) | (165) |
| Purchase of own shares | | | (250) | | | | | (250) | | (250) |
| At 1 January 2015 | 1,000 | 100 | (250) | 2,650 | 760 | 835 | 101 | 5,196 | 624 | 5,820 |
| Profit/(loss) for the year | | | | 400 | | | | 400 | 40 | 440 |
| Other Comprehensive Income | | | | | 40 | 30 | (10) | 60 | 6 | 66 |
| Dividends to Shareholders @50% | | | | (200) | | | | (200) | (20) | (220) |
| Issue of Shares | 150 | 87 | 220 | (50) | | | | 407 | | 407 |
| At 30 December 2015 | 1,150 | 187 | (30) | 2,800 | 800 | 865 | 91 | 5,863 | 650 | 6,513 |

== See also ==
- International Financial Reporting Standards (and its requirements)
- Income statement
- Cash flow statement
- Comprehensive income
- Accumulated other comprehensive income
