= Statement of changes in financial position =

In business accounting, the statement of change in financial position is a financial statement that outlines the sources and uses of funds and explains any changes in cash or working capital. There is no single, agreed-upon definition, but all are about comparative value of each cash statement.

== About ==
It contains activities from operations that alter the cash of a company has on hand. Changes in financial position include cash outflows, such as capital expenditures, and cash inflows, such as revenue. It may also include certain non-cash changes, such as depreciation.

The use of this statement is to provide relevant and focused on a period, so that users of financial statements with sufficient information to:

- Evaluate the company’s ability to generate resources.
- Assess the reasons for the differences between net income and funds generated or used by the operation.
- To assess the ability of the company to meet its obligations to pay dividends, and if necessary, to anticipate the need for funding.
- To assess the changes in the company’s financial situation arising from investing and financing transactions that occurred during the period.

== Vis-a-vis balance sheet ==
The basic financial statement shows the resources generated or used in the operation, the main changes in the financial structure of the entity and its final reflection on cash and cash equivalents through a period of time.

The term “constant dollars, pesos of purchasing power represent the balance sheet date (the last reported financial year comparative financial statements). The generation or use of resources is the change in constant pesos in the various balance sheet items, which arise or impact on cash.

In the case of monetary items that change includes the change in nominal pesos more or less its monetary effect.

== Activities ==
- Financing activities include obtaining shareholder funds and the repayment or payment of the benefits of their investment, payment of funds obtained through operations in the short and long term.
- Investing activities include the provision and collection of loans, purchase and sale of debt instruments, capital, real estate, equipment, machinery and other productive assets other than those that are considered business inventory.
- Operating activities are generally related to the production and distribution of goods and services, transactions and other events which affect the determination of net income and / or activities that result in movement of balances be directly related to the operation of the entity and are not framed in the activities of financing or investment.

== Impact ==
The set of changes in financial position, showing the registered modification in weights in each of the main areas of coverage, which, together with the profit or loss, determine the change of the resources of the entity during a period .

In this state relate the net result of the change management in the financial structure and all cl reflect the increase or decrease in cash and temporary investments during the period.

Within the range of activities promoted by businesses, has become increasingly clear that the resources are generated and / or used in three main areas:

1. In the course of its operations.
2. As a result of borrowings and their real depreciation in the short and long term.
3. In terms of investments and / or emersion made.

=== Operating ===
The resources generated or used by the operation are to add or decrease net income for the period (or before extraordinary items), the following concepts:

1. The income statement items that have not generated or required the use of resources or whose net income is linked to activities identified as financing or investment. Movements in estimates devaluation of assets are not considered in this settlement.
1. Increases or decreases (in constant dollars) in the different items directly related to the entity dc operation, reduced estimates for valuation.

=== Financing ===
The resources generated or used in financing activities to include:

1. Credits received short and long term, other than transactions with suppliers and / or creditors related to the operation of the company.
2. Amortization payments on these loans, excluding interest on.
3. Increase of capital for additional resources, including the capitalization of liabilities.
4. Repayments of capital.
5. Dividends paid. Other than stock dividends.

=== Investing ===
Funds from operations used in investing activities primarily include the following transactions:

1. Acquisition, construction and sale of property, plant and equipment
2. Acquisition of shares in other companies on a permanent basis
3. Any other investment or permanent surfacing.
4. Loans made by the company.
5. Collection or decrease in constant pesos of credit extended (excluding interest on).

The classification should be further to better reflect the essence of the transaction, based on the most important economic activity of the company.

== Mechanism for processing ==
Be part of the net profit or loss, or before extraordinary items or of the resources generated or used in the operation were presented before and after extraordinary items.

- Changes in financial position is determined by differences between the different categories of initial and final balance, expressed in constant pesos as of the date of the most recent balance sheet, classified into three groups mentioned above, should be analyzed significant changes arising in periods
- intermediate transfers offset each other, omitting his presentation in the statement of changes in financial position, if the transfer involves change in the financial structure must be submitted two separate movements, the updating of certain financial statement items should be removed the final balance of the game that gave birth and the corresponding equity, before making comparisons.
- The monetary effect change and fluctuations alter the purchasing power of firms, therefore, not to be regarded as virtual items had no impact on the generation and use of resources.

== See also ==
- International Financial Reporting Standards (and its requirements)
- Income statement
- Cash flow statement
- Comprehensive income
- Accumulated other comprehensive income
