= Non-operating income =

Parameter of accounting

Non-operating income, in accounting and finance, is gains or losses from sources not related to the typical activities of the business or organization. Non-operating income can include gains or losses from investments, property or asset sales, currency exchange, and other atypical gains or losses. Non-operating income is generally not recurring and is therefore usually excluded or considered separately when evaluating performance over a period of time (e.g. a quarter or year).

== See also ==
- Revenue
- Gross profit
- Earnings before tax (EBT)
- Earnings before interest, taxes, depreciation and amortization (EBITDA)
- Earnings before interest, taxes, depreciation, amortization, and restructuring or rent costs (EBITDAR)
- Operating profit
- Net income per employee
- Net profit/net income
- Financial result
- Profit before interest, depreciation and taxes - PBDIT
- Earnings before depreciation, interest and taxes - EBDIT
