= Deferred acquisition costs =

In insurance, deferred acquisition costs (DAC) is an asset on the balance sheet representing the deferral of the cost of acquiring new insurance contracts, thereby amortising the costs over their duration. Insurance companies face large upfront costs incurred in issuing new business, such as commissions to sales agents, underwriting, bonus interest and other acquisition expenses.

DAC under U.S. GAAP, MSSB (Modified Statutory Solvency Basis) and IAS 39 are all very similar, except that IAS 39 only allows direct, incremental costs to be deferred rather than all acquisition costs.

== Background ==
Insurance companies incur large expenses when acquiring new business, but to ensure that they comply with GAAP's matching principle they need to spread out these costs over the period in which revenues are earned.

The DAC is treated as an asset on the balance sheet and amortized over the life of the insurance contract.

== Accrual accounting ==
Accrual accounting and deferring implies timewise-matching (synchronization) of income and expenses: an incurred cost is capitalized and does not become an expense until it is recognized in the financial statements of the company. In an accounting sense, it is the amortization of that cost, and not the original cost itself, that becomes the expense. Hence, certain costs which are incurred to acquire insurance contracts should not be recognized as an expense in the accounting period in which they are incurred but should be capitalized as an asset on the balance sheet and gradually amortized over the lifetime of the insurance contracts. Such costs are called deferred acquisition expenses (DAE) and capitalization of DAE results in setting up of an asset called deferred acquisition costs (DAC).

Establishment of the DAC asset tends to reduce the policy's first year strain and generally produces a smoother pattern of earnings.

To meet the capitalization criteria, these expenses must vary with and be primarily related to the acquisition of new business.

Examples of DAE:

- Commissions in excess of ultimate commissions
- Underwriting costs
- Policy issuance costs

All other expenses associated with the new business that do not vary with and are not primarily related to new policies are classified as non-deferrable acquisition expenses.

== Amortization ==
DAC represents the "un-recovered investment" in the policies issued and are therefore capitalized as an intangible asset to match costs with related revenues. Over time the acquisition costs are recognized as an expense that reduces the DAC asset. The process of recognizing the costs in the income statement is known as amortization and refers to the DAC asset being amortized, or reduced over a number of years.

The amortization requires an amortization basis that determines how much DAC should be turned into an expense in each accounting period. The amortization basis varies by FAS classification:

- FAS 60/97LP – Premiums
- FAS 97 – Estimated gross profits (EGP)
- FAS 120 – Estimated gross margins (EGM)

Under FAS 60, assumptions are "locked in" at policy issue and cannot be changed. However, under FAS 97 and 120, assumptions are based on estimates that require adjusting DAC as needed. In addition, DAC amortization uses estimated gross margins as a basis and an interest rate is applied to the DAC based on investment returns. The rate at which one amortizes the DAC is referred to the k-factor.

A write-off of DAC or amortization of DAC may be caused by dynamical unlocking or true up. The replacement of assumptions by experience for the projections of future years is called "dynamical unlocking". The replacement of assumed values by realized values of the past year is called "true up process".

- Shadow DAC includes unrealized gains as required for balance sheet reporting. In other words, Shadow DAC is applied to reduce or increase the amortization of the DAC taking into consideration the unrealized gains and losses.
- Regular DAC amortization affects the income statement and does not take unrealized gains into account. In other words, regular DAC amortization takes into account any realized gains and losses in order to smooth out earnings. In case of a large loss regular DAC amortization can be applied to "defer" the acquisition costs to future periods thereby reducing the expenses and increasing yield for the specific period. The DAC amortization will thus increase in future reporting periods.

== K-factor ==
Also referred to as KDAC, the K-factor is basically the percentage of gross profits required to provide for deferred policy acquisition costs. KDAC is DAC amortization rate = [present value of DAE + accumulated value of DAC]/[present value of estimated gross profits (EGPs) + accumulated value of actual gross profits (AGPs)]

The K-factor can change from year to year due to:

- The true-up process (replacement of expected values by realized values, i.e. actual historical gross profits (AGP) replace prior EGPs)
- The dynamical unlocking (replacement of assumptions by experience for the projections of future years)

The DAC is recoverable if the K-factor is less than 100%.

If there is an unearned revenue liability (URL), it may even be recoverable if the K-factor is higher than 100%. If the K-factor is greater than 100% and there is no URL, a portion of the DAC or the total DAC has to be written off immediately, so that the new K-factor is equal 100%.

== See also ==
- Deferred tax
- Deferred financing cost
