= Tax expense =

Tax calculation for companies

A company's tax expense (or tax charge) is the income before tax multiplied by the appropriate tax rate. Generally, companies report income before tax to their shareholder under generally accepted accounting principles (GAAP). However, companies report income before tax to their government under tax law.

== Computation ==
As a result, the computation of the tax expense is considerably more complex. Tax law may provide for different treatment (from GAAP) of items of income and expenses as a result of tax policy. The differences may be of permanent or temporary nature. Permanent items are in the form of non taxable income and non taxable expenses. Things such as expenses considered not deductible by taxing authorities ("add backs"), the range of tax rates applicable to various levels of income, different tax rates in different jurisdictions, multiple layers of tax on income, and other issues.

== Variance in tax jurisdictions ==
For example, a government trying to promote savings may exempt interest income from tax or provide a lower rate for long term investments -such as capital gains. Conversely, a government trying to balance its foreign trade may disallow the deduction of international travel expenses or purchases made abroad.

An example of temporary items may be depreciation expense; sometimes governments provide for "accelerated" depreciation of particular items of interest to tax policy. Another common temporary difference refers to bad debt write-off where the governments may generally have a stricter standard requiring the filing of claims in court.

Historically, in many places, a revenue-expense method was used, in which the income statement was seen as primary, and the balance sheet as secondary. Under International Financial Reporting Standards, as well as many other accounting principles, tax expense is the result of computing current and deferred tax payable using the asset-liability method in which the balance sheet is seen as primary and the income statement as secondary. The approach in United States Generally Accepted Accounting Principles was codified in SFAS 96 published in December 1987, and updated in February 1992 with SFAS 109, accounting for income taxes from a balance-sheet approach. See List of FASB Pronouncements.

In the United States, the U.K. and elsewhere, companies are permitted to report one pre-tax income number (also called income before tax, profit before tax or earnings before income tax) to shareholders, and another, called taxable income, to the tax authorities. Differences between taxable income and the pre-tax income or profit number reported for financial statements are either temporary or permanent in nature. Permanent differences result when deductibility rules differ in perpetuity between accounting and tax law. Temporary differences result when the recognition of deductions for tax and accounting standards differ in their timing. The result is a gap between tax expense computed using income before tax and current tax payable computed using taxable income. This gap is known as deferred tax. If the tax expense exceeds the current tax payable then there is a deferred tax payable; if the current tax payable exceeds the tax expense then there is a deferred tax receivable.

== Long term trends ==
In the long run, income before tax and taxable income will likely be more similar than they are in any given period. If the one is less in earlier years, then it will be greater in later years. Deferred taxes will reverse themselves in the long run and in total will zero out, unless there is something like a change in tax rates in the intervening period. A deferred tax payable results from a tax break in the early years and will reverse itself in later years; a deferred tax receivable results from more taxes being paid in early years than the tax expense reported to shareholders and will again reverse itself in later years. The deferred tax amount is computed by estimating the amount and the timing of the reversal and multiplying that by the appropriate tax rates.

== Practical accounting considerations ==
For each of current tax and deferred tax, there may be elements which relate to the current accounting period (current year current tax and current year deferred tax), as well as items which relate to earlier accounting periods (strictly adjustments in respect of prior years, but often simply referred to as prior year current tax and prior year deferred tax).

Typically, adjustments in respect of prior years arise because the tax calculations made for the statutory accounts (which need only be materially correct, and are prepared in a tight time frame to meet the accounts filing deadline) differ from those done for the filing of the tax return (typically done later in the year, with much greater thoroughness). This difference is therefore included in the tax expense line in the following year’s accounts. Other reasons for prior year elements to the tax expense may be where a past income tax return was re-submitted with a different tax result (either because the taxpayer elected to, or because they were forced to by a tax authority who disagreed with the original filing). In any case, having adjustments in respect of prior years is a standard part of the tax expense item, and should not be considered a misstatement in the original accounts – the tax expense item is not being restated.

In a set of statutory accounts, there will usually be a note to the accounts which provides a breakdown of the elements of the tax expense i.e. current tax (current year and prior year), deferred tax (current year and prior year). The exact disclosure requirement and format will depend on the relevant accounting standards under which the accounts were prepared (e.g. IFRS, US GAAP, UK GAAP). It may also be required to show foreign tax charges separately, so that the current tax items only relate to tax in the home country (this is the case under UK GAAP, for example). Foreign tax may also have current and prior year elements, and foreign tax may arise on the same underlying profits as domestic tax (where there is double taxation).

== See also ==
- Net income
