= Gain (accounting) =

In financial accounting (CON 8.4), a gain is when the market value of an asset exceeds the purchase price of that asset. The gain is unrealized until the asset is sold for cash, at which point it becomes a realized gain. This is an important distinction for tax purposes, as only realized gains are subject to tax. Gains are the result of circumstances, events, or transactions which affect the entity independent of revenue or owner investments. They are usually the result of holding gains, exchange transactions, events, or nonreciprocal transactions.

== Types of gain ==
1. "Events" while loss events such as natural catastrophes are fairly common, gain events are rare. Their defining feature is that they are nonreciprocal (the reporting entity does not expend anything of measurable economic value in return) and beyond the control of the entity reporting the gain. An example of a gain event would be a that company acquired land with the intent of constructing a manufacturing facility, but discovered previously undiscovered mineral deposits during construction.
2. "Exchange transactions" are incidental to an entity's operations. For example, when an entity sells a machine it manufactured for sale, it recognizes the amount received as revenue and the cost of the machine cost of sales (an expense). If, on the other hand, an entity sells a machine previously used in production, it recognizes a gain if it receives more for the machine than its depreciated value (Depreciation).
3. "Holding gains" result from changes in value of assets and liabilities held by an entity. Holding gains generally occur when a company applies mark to market accounting. For example, in year one a company buys the shares of another company on the market for 1000. At the end of year one, the market value of the shares is 1200 and the company sells the shares for 1400 at the end of year two. At the end of year one it would recognize an (unrealized) gain of 200. At the end of year two it would recognize a gain of 200 (the realized gain of 400 less the previously recognized unrealized gain of 200). Whether unrealized holding gains are recognized is determined by the financial accounting standards (for example IFRS, US GAAP or some other national GAAP) applied.
4. "Nonreciprocal transactions" can be recognized as either revenue or gains depending on the circumstances. For example, a charitable contribution received by a not-for profit entity would be recognized as revenue even though the transaction is nonreciprocal and beyond the control of the charity. In contrast, a government grant received by a for-profit entity would recognize a gain because the transaction is nonreciprocal and beyond the control of the entity. How entities recognize nonreciprocal gain transactions is determined by the financial accounting standards (for example IFRS, US GAAP or some other national GAAP) applied.

== Realized and unrealized gains and losses ==
In common usage, a gain or loss is realized when the underlying asset or liability is converted to cash. For example, if a share of stock is bought on the market for 100 and later sold for 120, the gain of 20 is realized. If it is bought but not sold, the gain of 20 is unrealized assuming the market value is 120.

Accounting standards such as IFRS and US GAAP differentiate realized from unrealized in a somewhat different way. For example, under US GAAP (US Generally Accepted Accounting Principles) a gain or loss is “realized” when the market value of an investment is designated to be held for trading, and such investment value increases or decreases: in this case the gain or the loss in question is reported in an income statement account.

The gain (loss) is instead called “unrealized” when the market value of an investment is designated to be held for sale, and such investment value changes: in this case it is reported in the Other Comprehensive Income of the income statement.

== See also ==
- List of accounting topics
