= Comprehensive income =

American financial reporting metric

In company financial reporting in the United States, comprehensive income (or comprehensive earnings) "includes all changes in equity during a period except those resulting from investments by owners and distributions to owners". Because that use excludes the effects of changing ownership interest, an economic measure of comprehensive income is necessary for financial analysis from the shareholders' point of view (all changes in equity except those resulting from investment by or distribution to owners).

== Accounting ==
Comprehensive income is defined by the Financial Accounting Standards Board, or FASB, as “the change in equity [net assets] of a business enterprise during a period from transactions and other events and circumstances from non-owner sources. It includes all changes in equity during a period except those resulting from investments by owners and distributions to owners.”

Comprehensive income is the sum of net income and other items that must bypass the income statement because they have not been realized, including items like an unrealized holding gain or loss from available for sale securities and foreign currency translation gains or losses. These items are not part of net income, yet are important enough to be included in comprehensive income, giving the user a bigger, more comprehensive picture of the organization as a whole.

Items included in comprehensive income, but not net income, are reported under the accumulated other comprehensive income section of shareholder's equity.

== Financial analysis ==
Comprehensive income attempts to measure the sum total of all operating and financial events that have changed the value of an owner's interest in a business. It is measured on a per-share basis to capture the effects of dilution and options. It cancels out the effects of equity transactions for which the owner would be indifferent: dividend payments, share buy-backs, and share issues at market value.

It is calculated by reconciling the book value per-share from the start of the period to the end of the period. This is conceptually the same as measuring a child's growth by finding the difference between his height on each birthday. All other line items are calculated, and the equation solved for comprehensive earnings.

Income Comprehensive definition: "income is increases[clarification needed] in economic benefits in form of inflows or encashment of assets or decrease in liabilities that result is increase in capital(owners equity) is called income".

      Shareholders' Equity, beg. of period (per share)
    - Dividends paid (per share)
    + Shares issued (premium over book value per share)
    - Share buy-backs (premium over book value per share)
    + Comprehensive Income (per share)
    ------------------------------------------ 
    = Shareholders' Equity, end of period (per share)

== See also ==
- Accumulated other comprehensive income
- Income statement
- International Financial Reporting Standards
- Net income
- Statement of changes in equity
- Statement of comprehensive income
- U.S. Generally Accepted Accounting Principles
