= Consolidation (business) =

Merger and acquisition of many smaller companies into much larger ones

In business, consolidation or amalgamation is the merger and acquisition of many smaller companies into a few much larger ones. In the context of financial accounting, consolidation refers to the aggregation of financial statements of a group company as consolidated financial statements. The taxation term of consolidation refers to the treatment of a group of companies and other entities as one entity for tax purposes. Under the Halsbury's Laws of England, amalgamation is defined as "a blending together of two or more undertakings into one undertaking, the shareholders of each blending company, becoming, substantially, the shareholders of the blended undertakings. There may be amalgamations, either by transfer of two or more undertakings to a new company or the transfer of one or more companies to an existing company".

== Overview ==
Consolidation is the practice, in business, of legally combining two or more organizations into a single new one. Upon consolidation, the original organizations cease to exist and are supplanted by a new entity.

== Economic motivation ==
- Access to new technologies/techniques
- Access to new clients
- Access to new geographies
- Cheaper financing for a bigger company
- Seeking for hidden or nonperforming assets belonging to a target company (e.g. real estate)
- Bigger companies tend to have superior bargaining power over their suppliers and clients (e.g. Walmart)
- Synergies

== Types of business amalgamations ==
There are three forms of business combinations:

- Statutory Merger: a business combination that results in the liquidation of the acquired company's assets and the survival of the purchasing company.
- Statutory Consolidation: a business combination that creates a new company in which none of the previous companies survive.
- Stock Acquisition: a business combination in which the purchasing company acquires the majority, more than 50%, of the Common stock of the acquired company and both companies survive.
- Variable interest entity

== Terminology ==
- Parent-subsidiary relationship: the result of a stock acquisition where the parent is the acquiring company and the subsidiary is the acquired company.
- Controlling Interest: When the parent company owns a majority of the common stock.
- Non-Controlling Interest or minority interest: the rest of the common stock that the other shareholders own.
- Wholly owned subsidiary: when the parent owns all the outstanding common stock of the subsidiary.
- In an amalgamation, the companies which merge into a new or existing company are referred to as transferor companies or amalgamating companies. The resultant company is referred to as the transferee company.

== Accounting treatment (U.S. GAAP) ==
A parent company can acquire another company by purchasing its net assets or by purchasing a majority share of its common stock. Regardless of the method of acquisition, the costs (including direct costs, costs of issuing securities and indirect costs) are treated as follows:

- Direct costs, indirect and general costs: the acquiring company expenses all acquisition related costs as they are incurred.
- Costs of issuing securities: these costs reduce the issuing price of the stock.

=== Purchase of net assets ===
Treatment to the acquiring company: When purchasing the net assets the acquiring company records in its books the receipt of the net assets and the disbursement of cash, the creation of a liability or the issuance of stock as a form of payment for the transfer.

Treatment to the acquired company: The acquired company records in its books the elimination of its net assets and the receipt of cash, receivables or investment in the acquiring company (if what was received from the transfer included common stock from the purchasing company). If the acquired company is liquidated then the company needs an additional entry to distribute the remaining assets to its shareholders.

=== Purchase of common stock ===
Treatment to the purchasing company: When the purchasing company acquires the subsidiary through the purchase of its common stock, it records in its books the investment in the acquired company and the disbursement of the payment for the stock acquired.

Treatment to the acquired company: The acquired company records in its books the receipt of the payment from the acquiring company and the issuance of stock.

FASB 141 disclosure requirements: FASB 141 requires disclosures in the notes of the financial statements when business combinations occur. Such disclosures are:

- The name and description of the acquired entity and the percentage of the voting equity interest acquired.
- The primary reasons for acquisition and descriptions of factors that contributed to recognition of goodwill.
- The period for which results of operations of acquired entity are included in the income statement of the combining entity.
- The cost of the acquired entity and if it applies the number of shares of equity interest issued, the value assigned to those interests and the basis for determining that value.
- Any contingent payments, options or commitments.
- The purchase and development assets acquired and written off.

Treatment of goodwill impairments:

- If Non-Controlling Interest (NCI) based on fair value of identifiable assets: impairment taken against parent's income & R/E
- If NCI based on fair value of purchase price: impairment taken against subsidiary's income & R/E

== Reporting intercorporate interest—investments in common stock ==
=== 20% ownership or less—investment ===
When a company purchases less than 20% of the outstanding common stock, the purchasing company's influence over the acquired company is not significant. (APB 18 specifies conditions where ownership is less than 20% but there is significant influence.)

The purchasing company uses the cost method to account for this type of investment. Under the cost method, the investment is recorded at cost at the time of purchase. The company does not need any entries to adjust this account balance unless the investment is considered impaired or there are liquidating dividends, both of which reduce the investment account.

Liquidating dividends: Liquidating dividends occur when there is an excess of dividends declared over earnings of the acquired company since the date of acquisition. Regular dividends are recorded as dividend income whenever they are declared.

Impairment loss: An impairment loss occurs when there is a decline in the value of the investment other than temporary.

=== 20% to 50% ownership—associate company ===
When the amount of stock purchased is between 20% and 50% of the common stock outstanding, the purchasing company's influence over the acquired company is often significant. The deciding factor, however, is significant influence. If other factors exist that reduce the influence or if significant influence is gained at an ownership of less than 20%, the equity method may be appropriate (FASB interpretation 35 (FIN 35) underlines the circumstances where the investor is unable to exercise significant influence).

To account for this type of investment, the purchasing company uses the equity method. Under the equity method, the purchaser records its investment at original cost. This balance increases with income and decreases for dividends from the subsidiary that accrue to the purchaser.

Treatment of Purchase Differentials: At the time of purchase, purchase differentials arise from the difference between the cost of the investment and the book value of the underlying assets.

Purchase differentials have two components:

- The difference between the fair market value of the underlying assets and their book value.
- Goodwill: the difference between the cost of the investment and the fair market value of the underlying assets.

Purchase differentials need to be amortized over their useful life; however, new accounting guidance states that goodwill is not amortized or reduced until it is permanently impaired, or the underlying asset is sold.

=== More than 50% ownership—subsidiary ===
When the amount of stock purchased is more than 50% of the outstanding common stock, the purchasing company has control over the acquired company. Control in this context is defined as ability to direct policies and management. In this type of relationship the controlling company is the parent and the controlled company is the subsidiary. The parent company needs to issue consolidated financial statements at the end of the year to reflect this relationship.

Consolidated financial statements show the parent and the subsidiary as one single entity. During the year, the parent company can use the equity or the cost method to account for its investment in the subsidiary. Each company keeps separate books. However, at the end of the year, a consolidation working paper is prepared to combine the separate balances and to eliminate the intercompany transactions, the subsidiary's stockholder equity and the parent's investment account. The result is one set of financial statements that reflect the financial results of the consolidated entity. There are three forms of combination: (1) horizontal integration: the combination of firms in the same business lines and markets; (2) vertical integration: the combination of firms with operations in different but successive stages of production or distribution or both; (3) conglomeration: the combination of firms with unrelated and diverse products or services functions, or both.

== See also ==
- Arrangements between railroads
- Associate company
- Business valuation
- Consolidated financial statement
- Enterprise value
- Goodwill (accounting)
- Minority interest
- Mergers and acquisitions
- Conglomerate
- Conglomerate discount
- Successor company
- Tax consolidation
