= Liquid capital =

Financial resources readily available for use, typically in cash or near-cash form

Liquid capital or fluid capital is the part of a firm's assets that it holds as money. It includes cash balances, bank deposits, and money market investments.

== Financial reporting and liquidity analysis ==
In financial reporting, liquid capital is closely related to cash and cash equivalents. Under IAS 7, cash consists of cash on hand and demand deposits, while cash equivalents are short-term, highly liquid investments that are readily convertible to known amounts of cash and subject to an insignificant risk of changes in value. These assets are used in assessing a firm's ability to meet short-term cash requirements and are distinguished from less liquid assets such as inventories, fixed assets, or long-term investments.

== See also ==
- Circulating capital
- High quality liquid assets
- Fixed asset
- Liquidity
