= Cash flow statement =

Financial statement

In financial accounting, a cash flow statement, also known as statement of cash flows, is a financial statement that shows how changes in balance sheet accounts and income affect cash and cash equivalents, and breaks the analysis down to operating, investing and financing activities. Essentially, the cash flow statement is concerned with the flow of cash in and out of the business. As an analytical tool, the statement of cash flows is useful in determining the short-term viability of a company, particularly its ability to pay bills. International Accounting Standard 7 (IAS 7) is the International Accounting Standard that deals with cash flow statements.

People and groups interested in cash flow statements include:

- Accounting personnel, who need to know whether the organization will be able to cover payroll and other immediate expenses
- Potential lenders or creditors, who want a clear picture of a company's ability to repay
- Potential investors, who need to judge whether the company is financially sound
- Potential employees or contractors, who need to know whether the company will be able to afford compensation
- Company Directors, who are responsible for the governance of the company, and are responsible for ensuring that the company does not trade while insolvent
- Shareholders of the company.

== Purpose ==
Statement of Cash Flow - Simple Example for the period 1 Jan 2006 to 31 Dec 2006
Cash flow from operations	$5,000
Cash flow from investing	($1,000)
Cash flow from financing	($2,000)
Net cash flow	$2,000
Parentheses indicate negative values

The cash flow statement shows the sources of a company's cash flow and how it was used over a specific time period. It is an important indicator of a company's financial health, because a company can report a profit on its income statement, but at the same time have insufficient cash to operate. The cash flow statement reveals the quality of a company's earnings (i.e. how much came from cash flow as opposed to accounting treatment), and the firm's capacity to pay interest and dividends.

The cash flow statement differs from the balance sheet and income statement in that it excludes non-cash transactions required by accrual basis accounting, such as depreciation, deferred income taxes, write-offs on bad debts and sales on credit where receivables have not yet been collected.

The cash flow statement is intended to:

1. provide information on a firm's liquidity, solvency and financial flexibility (the ability to change cash flows in future circumstances)
2. help predict future cash flows and borrowing needs
3. improve the comparability of different firms' operating performance by eliminating the effects of different accounting methods. The cash flow statement has been adopted as a standard financial statement because it eliminates allocations, which might be derived from different accounting methods, such as various timeframes for depreciating fixed assets.

== History and variations ==
Cash basis financial statements were very common before accrual basis financial statements. The "flow of funds" statements of the past were cash flow statements.

In 1863, the Dowlais Iron Company had recovered from a business slump, but had no cash to invest for a new blast furnace, despite having made a profit. To explain why there were no funds to invest, the manager made a new financial statement that was called a comparison balance sheet, which showed that the company was holding too much inventory. This new financial statement was the genesis of the cash flow statement that is used today.

In the United States in 1973, the Financial Accounting Standards Board (FASB) defined rules that made it mandatory under Generally Accepted Accounting Principles (US GAAP) to report sources and uses of funds, but the definition of "funds" was not clear. Net working capital might be cash or might be the difference between current assets and current liabilities. From the late 1970 to the mid-1980s, the FASB discussed the usefulness of predicting future cash flows. In 1987, FASB Statement No. 95 (FAS 95) mandated that firms provide cash flow statements. In 1992, the International Accounting Standards Board (IASB) issued International Accounting Standard 7 (IAS 7), Cash Flow Statement, which became effective in 1994, mandating that firms provide cash flow statements.

US GAAP and IAS 7 rules for cash flow statements are similar, but some of the differences are:

- IAS 7 requires that the cash flow statement include changes in both cash and cash equivalents. US GAAP permits using cash alone or cash and cash equivalents.
- IAS 7 permits bank borrowings (overdraft) in certain countries to be included in cash equivalents rather than being considered a part of financing activities.
- IAS 7 allows interest paid to be included in operating activities or financing activities. US GAAP requires that interest paid be included in operating activities.
- US GAAP (FAS 95) requires that when the direct method is used to present the operating activities of the cash flow statement, a supplemental schedule must also present a cash flow statement using the indirect method. The International Accounting Standards Committee (IASC) strongly recommends the direct method but allows either method. The IASC considers the indirect method less clear to users of financial statements. Cash flow statements are most commonly prepared using the indirect method, which is not especially useful in projecting future cash flows.

== Cash flow activities ==
International Accounting Standard 3 specifies the cash flows and adjustments to be included under each of the major activity categories.

=== Operating activities ===
Operating activities include the production, sales and delivery of the company's product as well as collecting payment from its customers. This could include purchasing raw materials, building inventory, advertising, and shipping the product.

Operating cash flows include:

- Receipts for the sale of loans, debt or equity instruments in a trading portfolio
- Interest received on loans
- Payments to suppliers for goods and services
- Payments to employees or on behalf of employees
- Interest payments (alternatively, this can be reported under financing activities in IAS 3)
- Purchases of merchandise

Items which are added back to (or subtracted from, as appropriate) net income (which is found on the Income Statement) to arrive at cash flows from operations generally include:

- Depreciation (loss of tangible asset value over time)
- Deferred tax
- Amortization (loss of intangible asset value over time)
- Any gains or losses associated with the sale of a non-current asset, because associated cash flows do not belong in the operating section (unrealized gains/losses are also added back from the income statement)
- Dividends received from general reserves

=== Investing activities ===
Examples of investing activities are:

- Purchase or sale of an asset
- Loans made to suppliers
- Payments related to mergers and acquisitions

=== Financing activities ===
Financing activities include inflows and outflows of cash between investors and the company, such as:

- Dividends paid
- Sale or repurchase of the company's stock
- Net borrowings
- Repayment of debt principal, including capital leases
- Other activities which impact the company's long-term liabilities and equity

== Disclosure of non-cash activities ==
Under IAS 7, non-cash investing and financing activities are disclosed in footnotes to the financial statements. Under US General Accepted Accounting Principles (GAAP), non-cash activities may be disclosed in a footnote or within the cash flow statement itself. Non-cash financing activities may include:

- Leasing to purchase an asset
- Converting debt to equity
- Exchanging non-cash assets or liabilities for other non-cash assets or liabilities
- Issuing share
- Payment of dividend taxes in exchange for assets

== Preparation methods ==
The direct method of preparing a cash flow statement results in a more easily understood report. The indirect method is almost universally used, because FAS 95 requires a supplementary report similar to the indirect method if a company chooses to use the direct method.

=== Direct method ===
The direct method for creating a cash flow statement reports major classes of gross cash receipts and payments. Under IAS 7, dividends received may be reported under operating activities or under investing activities. If taxes paid are directly linked to operating activities, they are reported under operating activities; if the taxes are directly linked to investing activities or financing activities, they are reported under investing or financing activities. Generally Accepted Accounting Principles (GAAP) vary from International Financial Reporting Standards in that under GAAP rules, dividends received from a company's investing activities is reported as an "operating activity," not an "investing activity."

Sample cash flow statement using the direct method

Cash flows from (used in) operating activities
Cash receipts from customers	9,500	
Cash paid to suppliers and employees	(2,000)	
Cash generated from operations (sum)	7,500	
Interest paid	(2,000)	
Income taxes paid	(3,000)	
Net cash flows from operating activities		2,500
Cash flows from (used in) investing activities
Proceeds from the sale of equipment	7,500	
Dividends received	3,000	
Net cash flows from investing activities		10,500
Cash flows from (used in) financing activities
Dividends paid	(2,500)	
Net cash flows used in financing activities		(2,500)
.
Net increase in cash and cash equivalents		10,500
Cash and cash equivalents, beginning of year		1,000
Cash and cash equivalents, end of year		$11,500

=== Indirect method ===
The indirect method uses net-income as a starting point, makes adjustments for all transactions for non-cash items, then adjusts from all cash-based transactions. An increase in an asset account is subtracted from net income, and an increase in a liability account is added back to net income. This method converts accrual-basis net income (or loss) into cash flow by using a series of additions and deductions.

==== Rules (operating activities) ====
*Non-cash expenses must be added back to NI. Such expenses may be represented on the balance sheet as decreases in long term asset accounts. Thus decreases in fixed assets increase NI.
To Find Cash Flows from Operating Activities using the Balance Sheet and Net Income
For Increases in	Net Inc Adj
Current Assets (Non-Cash)	Decrease
Current Liabilities	Increase
For All Non-Cash...	
*Expenses (Decreases in Fixed Assets)	Increase

The following rules can be followed to calculate Cash Flows from Operating Activities when given only a two-year comparative balance sheet and the Net Income figure. Cash Flows from Operating Activities can be found by adjusting Net Income relative to the change in beginning and ending balances of Current Assets, Current Liabilities, and sometimes Long Term Assets. When comparing the change in long term assets over a year, the accountant must be certain that these changes were caused entirely by their devaluation rather than purchases or sales (i.e. they must be operating items not providing or using cash) or if they are non-operating items.

- Decrease in non-cash current assets are added to net income
- Increase in non-cash current asset are subtracted from net income
- Increase in current liabilities are added to net income
- Decrease in current liabilities are subtracted from net income
- Expenses with no cash outflows are added back to net income (depreciation and/or amortization expense are the only operating items that have no effect on cash flows in the period)
- Revenues with no cash inflows are subtracted from net income
- Non operating losses are added back to net income
- Non operating gains are subtracted from net income

The intricacies of this procedure might be seen as,

$\text{Net Cash Flows from Operating Activities} = \text{ Net Income} + \text{Rule Items}$

For example, consider a company that has a net income of $100 this year, and its A/R increased by $25 since the beginning of the year. If the balances of all other current assets, long term assets and current liabilities did not change over the year, the cash flows could be determined by the rules above as $100 – $25 = Cash Flows from Operating Activities = $75. The logic is that, if the company made $100 that year (net income), and they are using the accrual accounting system (not cash based) then any income they generated that year which has not yet been paid for in cash should be subtracted from the net income figure in order to find cash flows from operating activities. And the increase in A/R meant that $25 of sales occurred on credit and have not yet been paid for in cash.

In the case of finding cash flows when there is a change in a fixed asset account, say the Buildings and Equipment account decreases, the change is added back to Net Income. The reasoning behind this is that Net Income is calculated as: Net Income = Rev - COGS - Depreciation Exp - Other Exp

Therefore, the Net Income figure will be decreased by the building's depreciation that year. This depreciation is not associated with an exchange of cash; therefore, the depreciation is added back to Net Income to remove the non-cash activity.

==== Rules (financing activities) ====
Finding the Cash Flows from Financing Activities is much more intuitive and needs little explanation. Generally, the things to account for are financing activities:

- Include as outflows, reductions of long term notes payable (as would represent the cash repayment of debt on the balance sheet)
- Or as inflows, the issuance of new notes payable
- Include as outflows, all dividends paid by the entity to outside parties
- Or as inflows, dividend payments received from outside parties
- Include as outflows, the purchase of notes stocks or bonds
- Or as inflows, the receipt of payments on such financing vehicles.

In the case of more advanced accounting situations, such as when dealing with subsidiaries, the accountant must

- Exclude intra-company dividend payments.
- Exclude intra-company bond interest

A traditional equation for this might look something like,

$$\begin{alignat}{2}\text{Net Cash Flows from Financing Activities} = & \left[\text{Dividends received from }3^{{\rm rd}}\text{ parties}\right]\\   & -\left[\text{Dividends paid to }3^{{\rm rd}}\text{ parties}\right]\\ & - [\text{Dividends paid to NCI but not} \\ & \text{intracompany dividend payments}] \end{alignat}$$

Example: cash flow of XYZ:

XYZ co. Ltd. Cash Flow Statement (all numbers in millions of Rs.)
Period ending	31 Mar 2010	31 Mar 2009	31 Mar 2008
Net income	21,538	24,589	17,046
Operating activities, cash flows provided by or used in:
Depreciation and amortization	2,790	2,592	2,747
Adjustments to net income	4,617	621	2,910
Decrease (increase) in accounts receivable	12,503	17,236	--
Increase (decrease) in liabilities (A/P, taxes payable)	131,622	19,822	37,856
Decrease (increase) in inventories	--	--	--
Increase (decrease) in other operating activities	(173,057)	(33,061)	(62,963)
Net cash flow from operating activities	13	31,799	(2,404)
Investing activities, cash flows provided by or used in:
Capital expenditures	(4,035)	(3,724)	(3,011)
Investments	(201,777)	(71,710)	(75,649)
Other cash flows from investing activities	1,606	17,009	(571)
Net cash flows from investing activities	(204,206)	(58,425)	(79,231)
Financing activities, cash flows provided by or used in:
Dividends paid	(9,826)	(9,188)	(8,375)
Sale (repurchase) of stock	(5,327)	(12,090)	133
Increase (decrease) in debt	101,122	26,651	21,204
Other cash flows from financing activities	120,461	27,910	70,349
Net cash flows from financing activities	206,430	33,283	83,311
Effect of exchange rate changes	645	(1,840)	731
Net increase (decrease) in cash and cash equivalents	2,882	4,817	2,407

== See also ==
- Cash flow
- Income statement
- Balance sheet
- Statement of changes in equity
