= Appreciation =

Appreciation may refer to:

== Financial ==
- Capital appreciation
- Currency appreciation and depreciation

== Other ==
- Gratitude
- Art criticism

== See also ==
- Depreciation
