= Minority interest =

Non-controlling interest, belonging to other investors

In accounting, minority interest (or non-controlling interest) is the portion of a subsidiary corporation's stock that is not owned by the parent corporation. The magnitude of the minority interest in the subsidiary company is generally less than 50% of outstanding shares, or the corporation would generally cease to be a subsidiary of the parent.

It is, however, possible (such as through special voting rights) for a controlling interest requiring consolidation to be achieved without exceeding 50% ownership, depending on the accounting standards being employed. Minority interest belongs to other investors and is reported on the consolidated balance sheet of the owning company to reflect the claim on assets belonging to other, non-controlling shareholders. Also, minority interest is reported on the consolidated income statement as a share of profit belonging to minority shareholders.

The reporting of 'minority interest' is a consequence of the requirement by accounting standards to 'fully' consolidate partly owned subsidiaries. Full consolidation, as opposed to partial consolidation, results in financial statements that are constructed as if the parent corporation fully owns these partly owned subsidiaries; except for two line items that reflect partial ownership of subsidiaries: net income to common shareholders and common equity. The two minority interest line items are the net difference between what would have been the common equity and net income to common, if all subsidiaries were fully owned, and the actual ownership of the group. All the other line items in the financial statements assume a fictitious 100% ownership.

Some investors have expressed concern that the minority interest line items cause significant uncertainty for the assessment of value, leverage and liquidity. A key concern of investors is that they cannot be sure what part of the reported cash position is owned by a 100% subsidiary and what part is owned by a 51% subsidiary.

Minority interest is an integral part of the enterprise value of a company. The converse concept is an associate company.

== Accounting treatment ==
Under the International Financial Reporting Standards, the non-controlling interest is reported in accordance with IFRS 5 and is shown at the very bottom of the Equity section on the consolidated balance sheet and subsequently on the statement of changes in equity. Under US GAAP minority interest can be reported either in the liabilities section, the equity section or, preceding changes to acceptable accounting standards, the mezzanine section of the balance sheet. The mezzanine section is located between liabilities and equity. FASB FAS 160 and FAS 141r significantly alter the way a parent company accounts for non-controlling interest (NCI) in a subsidiary. It is no longer acceptable to report minority interest in the mezzanine section of the balance sheet.

== Public sector usage ==
From 2013 onwards, the UK Government stated that it would become a minority equity co-investor in future Private Finance Initiative projects, which thereafter were referred to as "PF2 projects".

== See also ==
- Associate company (the converse concept)
- Articles of incorporation
- Business valuation
- Consolidation (business)
- Drag-along right
- Equity method
- Pre-emption right
- Share capital
- Tag-along right
- Voting interest
