= Deferred financing cost =

Accounting principle

Deferred financing costs or debt issuance costs is an accounting concept meaning costs associated with issuing debt (loans and bonds), such as various fees and commissions paid to investment banks, law firms, auditors, regulators, and so on. Since these payments do not generate future benefits, they are treated as a contra debt account. The costs are capitalized, reflected in the balance sheet as a contra long-term liability, and amortized using the effective interest method or over the finite life of the underlying debt instrument, if below de minimus. The unamortized amounts are included in the long-term debt, as a reduction of the total debt (hence contra debt) in the accompanying consolidated balance sheets. Early debt repayment results in expensing these costs.

== GAAP ==
Under U.S. GAAP, when issuing securities without specific maturity, such as perpetual preferred stock, financing costs reduce the amount of paid in capital associated with that security.

== Tax treatment ==
For U.S. federal income tax purposes, DFC are generally amortized over the life of the debt using the straight-line method.

== Early extinguishment of debt ==
When debt is repaid or otherwise extinguished before maturity, any remaining unamortized deferred financing costs are generally recognized in current earnings as part of the gain or loss on extinguishment. U.S. GAAP guidance summarized by Deloitte notes that unamortized debt issuance costs are written off when the related debt is extinguished.

If only a portion of an outstanding debt issue is extinguished, the remaining unamortized debt issuance costs are allocated between the portion extinguished and the portion that remains outstanding, and the amount allocated to the extinguished portion is included in the gain or loss on extinguishment.

== See also ==
- Deferred tax
- Deferred acquisition costs
