= P2F =

Internet finance model

- Chinese: 个人对金融机构
- Industry: Internet Finance
- Other names: P2F model, P2F finance

P2F (Chinese: 个人对金融机构), also known as the P2F model or P2F finance, is an Internet finance model that connects individuals with financial institution products through online platforms. The term stands for "person-to-financial institution" The term refers to the mode in which individuals connect with the products of financial institutions and quasi-financial institutions through the Internet.

In the term "P2F", "P" stands for "peer", and "F" stands for "financial institution" or "financial asset". P2F is gradually derived from the P2P model. The representatives of P2F are Beevault, and Yu'ebao (余额宝).

== Definition ==
The term was coined in 2012 by Xie Ping and Zou Chuanwei to describe a model where individuals access financial institution products through internet platforms.

Compared with P2P (peer-to-peer) finance:

- P2P connects individuals to individuals
- P2F connects individuals to financial institutions
