= MSSB =

MSSB may refer to:

- MacArthur Story Stem Battery (MSSB), a form of psychological testing
- Metropolitan Separate School Board, the former name for the Toronto Catholic District School Board from 1953–1998
- Missile Servicing and Storage Building (MSSB), a specialist building at RAF Scampton in the 1950s
- Morgan Stanley Smith Barney, the broker-retailer division of Morgan Stanley
- Modified Statutory Solvency Basis (MSSB), an actuarial method of Deferred Acquisition Costs in the insurance industry
