= Sly Bailey =

British businesswoman

Sylvia Bailey
- Born: Sylvia Grice; 24 January 1962 (age 64)
- Occupation: Chief Executive (former)
- Spouse: Peter Bailey

Sylvia Bailey, née Grice (born 24 January 1962), is a former chief executive of Trinity Mirror, the UK's largest newspaper publisher, and a non-executive director of EMI from 2004 to 2007. She was named as one of the "50 Most Powerful Women in Britain" by Management Today. She was also named as one of the top 20 most influential figures in media by MediaGuardian and as one of the top 50 most powerful businesswomen outside the United States by Fortune. She left Trinity Mirror, six months earlier than planned, in June 2012.

== Early life ==
She was educated at St. Saviour's and St. Olave's Grammar School for Girls, in Southwark, south-east London. In 1978 she briefly attended the Italia Conti Academy of Theatre Arts.

== Career ==
Bailey began her career as a make-up artist for Revlon. In 1984 she joined The Guardian newspaper working in advertising sales. Bailey became advertising manager at The Independent newspaper in 1987.

=== Trinity Mirror ===
Bailey joined Trinity Mirror as chief executive in February 2003. On 30 June 2008, Trinity Mirror issued a trading statement forecasting a 10% reduction in anticipated profits, leading to a collapse in the share price to a low of 73.5p, compared to its 12-month high of 557.5p.

The Independent's media columnist Stephen Glover pointed out that the company's market value had slumped from £1.5 bn to £250m, and commented: "... it is difficult to see how Sly Bailey, Trinity Mirror's preposterously well-rewarded chief executive, can remain much longer in her job . . . "

In July 2011 Bailey launched an investigation into editorial controls and procedures at Mirror Group newspapers following allegations of phone hacking. In October 2011, Bailey became the first serving media executive to appear at the Leveson Inquiry.

Late on 3 May 2012 it was announced that Bailey was to leave her post at Trinity Mirror by the end of the year, but she in fact left in mid June. The General Secretary of the National Union of Journalists, Michelle Stanistreet, said of her at the time: "Finally, Sly Bailey is doing the decent thing and leaving the company she has led into monumental decline." Reportedly, she received a £900,000 payoff.

In 2023, in a judgement against Trinity Mirror (now Reach PLC) and in favour of Prince Harry about the phone hacking scandal, judge Timothy Fancourt said that Bailey “knew or – what in law amounts to the same thing – turned a blind eye to it [unlawful information gathering] from about the end of 2006” whilst she was CEO.

== Other activities ==
Sly Bailey has been on the Press Association board since 2003. She was awarded an Honorary Degree from the University of East London in 2005.
