= Non-financial asset =

Financing term

A non-financial asset is an asset that cannot be traded on the financial markets and whose value is derived by its physical net worth rather than from a contractual claim, as opposed to a financial asset (e.g., stock, bonds). Non-financial assets may be tangible (also known as real assets, e.g., land, buildings, equipment, and vehicles) but also intangible (e.g., patents, intellectual property, data).

Non-financial assets can be further divided into produced assets (fixed assets, inventories, and valuables) and non-produced assets (natural resources, contracts, leases and licenses, and goodwill and marketing assets).

Non-financial assets can be transformed into financial assets through securitization; the non-financing asset thus becomes an underlying asset.
