= Amortization (accounting) =

Accounting term for the spreading of payments over multiple periods

In accounting, amortization is a method of obtaining the expenses incurred by an intangible asset arising from a decline in value as a result of use or the passage of time. Amortization is the acquisition cost minus the residual value of an asset, calculated in a systematic manner over an asset's useful economic life. Depreciation is a corresponding concept for tangible assets.

Methodologies for allocating amortization to each accounting period are generally the same as those for depreciation. However, many intangible assets such as goodwill or certain brands may be deemed to have an indefinite useful life and are therefore not subject to amortization (although goodwill is subjected to an impairment test every year).

While theoretically amortization is used to account for the decreasing value of an intangible asset over its useful life, in practice many companies will amortize what would otherwise be one-time expenses through listing them as a capital expenditure on the cash flow statement and paying off the cost through amortization, having the effect of improving the company's net income in the fiscal year or quarter of the expense.

Amortization is recorded in the financial statements of an entity as a reduction in the carrying value of the intangible asset in the balance sheet and as an expense in the income statement.

Under International Financial Reporting Standards, guidance on accounting for the amortization of intangible assets is contained in IAS 38. Under United States generally accepted accounting principles (GAAP), the primary guidance is contained in FAS 142.

== See also ==
- Annuity
- Earnings before interest, taxes, depreciation and amortization (EBITDA)
- Index of real estate articles
