= Government financial statements =

Government financial statements are annual financial statements or reports for the year. The financial statements, in contrast to budget, present the revenue collected and amounts spent. The government financial statements usually include a statement of activities (similar to an income statement in the private sector), a balance sheet and often some type of reconciliation. Cash flow statements are often included to show the sources of the revenue and the destination of the expenses.

== Specific countries and jurisdictions ==
=== India ===
The Annual Financial Statement of India is tabled in the Indian Parliament by the Finance Minister on the Budget Day. 13-15 other documents are also released in the Parliament along with the actual statement. Briefly divided into three parts, namely Consolidated Fund, Contingency Fund and Public Account, the statement comprises the receipts and expenditure incurred by the government on each part.

=== United Kingdom ===
The UK Government publishes annual accounts for the whole of government. It aims to provide more complete data for fiscal planning by producing consolidated financial statements. The accounts are produced in accordance with the International Financial Reporting Standards and independently audited by the Comptroller and Auditor General.

=== United States ===
In the United States, financial reporting in the federal government (national) must be in accordance with the Chief Financial Officer Act. The elements of financial reports are regulated by the Office of Federal Financial Management. At the state and local level of the United States, the Governmental Accounting Standards Board (GASB) make the accounting and financial rules. A major change came in June 1999, when GASB introduced accrual and consolidated rules with fund accounting taking a secondary role.
