= SG&A =

Accounting term representing operating costs

SG&A (alternately SGA, SAG, G&A, SGNA or Operating expenses) is an initialism used in accounting to refer to Selling, General, and Administrative Expenses, which is a major non-production cost presented in an income statement.

SGA expenses are cost of doing business, they refer to:

- Selling: The sum of all direct and indirect selling expenses, which includes salaries of labor (excluding those related to the production itself which are cost of goods sold), advertising expenses, rent, and all expenses and taxes related to selling the product;
- General: General operating expenses and taxes that are directly related to the general operation of the company, but do not relate to the other two categories;
- Administration: Executive salaries and general support and all associated taxes related to the overall administration of the company.

These expenses are sometimes referred to as overheads, and represent indirect or fixed costs. They are not directly associated with the production of goods.

== In construction ==
In the construction industry, G&A expenses are often referred to as soft costs. Soft costs include architectural, engineering, financing, and legal fees, as well as other pre- and post-construction expenses. These are costs incurred in addition to labor and material costs, including architectural or engineering fees incurred to repair loss or damage to the property.

A soft cost to a contractor, such as his administrative costs, can be a hard cost to the property owner because what the contractor invoices the owner is the owner's direct cost.

The soft costs endorsement provided in the Builders’ Risk section of the AAIS Inland Marine Guide lists 10 types of soft costs: advertising, design fees, professional fees, financing, lease administration, real estate taxes, general administration, lease expenses, permit fees, and insurance premiums.

Soft costs may include unforeseen construction costs (lost screws, damaged equipment), physical labor (tasks taking longer than expected, losing a key team member), or time wasted on strategy implementation (taking too long to decide a course of action).

== See also ==
- Income statement
- Net income
