= Net income per employee =

Calculation of a company's income minus costs

Net income per employee (NIPE) is a company's net income divided by the number of employees. This number shows the company how efficient it is with its employees. Theoretically, the higher the net income per employee the better. Aside from increasing the productivity of employees, this number could be increased by a number of other factors. The company can become more efficient by using better and more advanced technology than before. The company could also have released a commercially successful product, that they made huge profits off of. However, there are way in which the NIPE could be increased directly from the employees. This could be from employees getting a higher education or having better skill sets in their particular job.

Some factors could also decrease the NIPE in a company. This could happen when a company has a high turnover ratio. When a lot of valuable employees quit their job, the company will have to hire new employees to fill the spots. These new employees will have to be trained first, which will make the company less efficient in the meantime. The NIPE is usually used to compare companies in the same industry. This is because some businesses sectors need more employees by nature, to drive their revenue and profits, than other sectors. Banks for instance need many employees which means that their NIPE could be lower than that of a Skittles factory. However, this does not mean that the Skittles factory makes more money than the bank. There are no rules about what constitutes a good level of income per employee, or a bad level. The NIPE, in no way at all, shows how profitable or successful a company is.

According to Lowell Bryan writing in the McKinsey Quarterly, "To boost the potential for wealth creation, strategically minded executives must embrace a radical idea: changing financial-performance metrics to focus on returns on talent rather than returns on capital alone." This means that a company should not solely look at the profit that is created from investor's capital, but also by the profit that is gained by the talent of the employees that work in the company and turn the capital into such profits.

== See also ==
- Net income
- Operating income
- Economic value added
- Gross income
- Earnings growth
