= Actual cash value =

Method of valuing insured property

In the property and casualty insurance industry, actual cash value (ACV) is a method of valuing insured property, or the value computed by that method.

Actual cash value (ACV) is not equal to replacement cost value (RCV). ACV is computed by subtracting depreciation from replacement cost. The depreciation is usually calculated by establishing a useful life of the item determining what percentage of that life remains. This percentage multiplied by the replacement cost equals the actual cash value.

For instance, imagine a person bought a television set for $2,000 five years ago, which was destroyed in a hurricane. Their insurance provider estimates that televisions typically have a useful life of 10 years. Today, a similar television would cost $2,500. The damaged television had 50% (5 years) of its life remaining. According to insurance calculations, the ACV is determined by multiplying the current replacement cost of $2,500 by the remaining useful life percentage of 50%, resulting in an ACV of $1,250.

This concept is different from the book value used by accountants in financial statements or for tax purposes. Accountants use the purchase price and subtract the accumulated depreciation in order to value the item on a balance sheet. Actual cash value uses the current replacement cost of a new item.

== Other methods of insurance valuation ==
Insurance policies may be purchased capitalizing several different valuation methods. These include: Replacement cost value (RCV), fixed value (guaranteed replacement cost) and actual cash value (ACV). Some policies will use different calculating methods depending upon the item. For example, the building may be insured at replacement cost value, most of the contents insured at actual cash value and a few specific items at a fixed value (antiques). Policies may also include co-insurance clause or deductibles provisions which will impact the actual cash paid out by the insurance company.

== See also ==
- Cash value
