= Capital appreciation =

Increase of value of finance over time

Capital appreciation is an increase in the price or value of assets. It may refer to appreciation of company stocks or bonds held by an investor, an increase in land valuation, or other upward revaluation of fixed assets.

Capital appreciation may occur passively and gradually, without the investor taking any action. It is distinguished from a capital gain which is the profit achieved by selling an asset. Capital appreciation may or may not be shown in financial statements; if it is shown, by revaluation of the asset, the increase is said to be "recognized". Once the asset is sold, the appreciation since the date of initially buying the asset becomes a "realized" gain.

When the term is used about valuation of companies publicly listed, capital appreciation is the goal of an investor seeking long-term growth. It is growth in the principal amount invested, but not necessarily an increase in the current income from the asset.

In the context of investment in a mutual fund, capital appreciation refers to a rise in the value of the securities in a portfolio which contributes to the growth in net asset value. A capital appreciation fund is a fund for which it is its primary goal, and accordingly invests in growth stocks.

== See also ==
- Currency appreciation and depreciation
- Depreciation
- Holding gains
