= Replacement value =

Amount of pay needed to replace an asset's current worth

The term replacement cost or replacement value is the amount that an entity would have to pay to replace an asset (in undamaged condition) at current market prices.

In the insurance industry, "replacement cost" or "replacement cost value" is one of several methods of determining the value of an insured item. Replacement cost is the actual cost to replace an item or structure at its pre-loss condition. This may not be the "market value" of the item, and is typically distinguished from the "actual cash value" payment which includes a deduction for depreciation. For property insurance policies, it is common to stipulate in the contract that the lost asset must be actually repaired or replaced before the replacement cost can be paid. This prevents overinsurance, which contributes to insurance fraud by arson or other means; concern about overinsurance restricted the availability of replacement cost policies until the mid-20th century.

If insurance carriers honestly determine replacement cost, it becomes a "win-win" for both for the carriers and the customers. However, when a replacement cost determination is made by the carrier (and, perhaps, its third party expert) that exceeds the actual cost of replacement, the customer is likely to be paying for more insurance than necessary. To the extent that the carrier has knowingly or carelessly sold excessive (i.e. unnecessary) insurance, such a practice may constitute consumer fraud.

Replacement cost coverage is designed so the policy holder will not have to spend more money to get a similar new item and that the insurance company does not pay for intangibles. For example: when a television is covered by a replacement cost value policy, the cost of a similar television which can be purchased today determines the compensation amount for that item. This kind of policy is more expensive than an Actual Cash Value policy, where the policyholder will not be compensated for the depreciation of an item that is the subject of a claim. The total amount paid by an insurance company on a claim may also involve other factors such as co-insurance or deductibles. One of the champions of the replacement cost method was the Dutch professor in Business economics Théodore Limperg.

== Vendors ==
Insurers purchase estimations on replacement cost from estimation companies. Consumer-focused tools include AccuCoverage and Home Smart Reports.

== Home insurance in the United States ==
If insufficient coverage is purchased to rebuild a home, the insured themselves may have to pay substantial uninsured costs. In 2013, a survey found that about 60% of homes have replacement cost estimates which are too low by an estimated 17 percent. In some cases, estimates can be too low because of "demand surge" after a catastrophe.

Historically, consumers could purchase "guaranteed replacement cost" coverage which ensure sufficient limits if the estimate was too low, but these became "virtually extinct" after several California disasters including the Oakland firestorm of 1991, the Laguna Beach fires, and the 1994 Northridge earthquake.

=== Underinsurance responsibility ===
Although insurance is decided at the state-level, most states follow similar practices. In California and Texas, the insured is responsible for determining the proper amount of insurance. However, one survey found that about half of consumers believe it is the insurer's responsibility, and consumers may come to this conclusion through the insurer's processes, which one legal scholar argues creates a "reasonable expectation" of coverage, which is a controversial insurance law doctrine adopted in certain states.

In California, a 2007 case on the issue, Everett vs. State Farm General Insurance Company, provoked an unsuccessful request by the California Department of Insurance and insurance non-profit United Policyholders to depublish the case.

== Infrastructure ==
In urban planning, the replacement cost of public infrastructure (such as transport infrastructure or water infrastructure) is an important issue to avoid insolvency. If the cost of maintenance and eventual replacement of a road (usually due 20 to 25 years after construction) exceeds the funds the (usually local) government has available or could raise to cover it, it could contribute to bankruptcy.

== See also ==
- Actual cash value
- Holding gains
- Intrinsic value (finance) § Equity
- Tobin's q
