= Stock statement =

Type of business statement

A stock statement is a business statement that provides information on the value and quantity of stock-related transactions. This statement describes how much stock was purchased at what value and when, and is a matter of accounts and finance supplied by the cash credit account holder (e.g. a private limited company) to banks providing loans at a regular interval. It details opening and closing balances for transacted items as well.

Banks providing loans wish to know their customers' stock values as of a certain date. To ascertain this value, an accountant first needs to know the existing quantity of the company's stock on that day. This quantity will then be multiplied by the rate of its market value. The result will be the stock value. Making a statement of all kinds of stocks in a company's store on that particular date becomes a "bank stock statement", also known as an "inventory statement".

To know the existing quantity of stocks, an owner may count the materials in the company's store(s). If the amount of stocks is very large, the accountant can opt for the following formula:

Closing stock = (opening stock in cost) + purchases - sales

For example:

- Opening stock in hand in cost = 100,000 pieces
- Add: Purchases during the period = 200,000 pieces
- Subtract: Sales during the period = (75,000) pieces
- Closing stock = 225,000 pieces

After getting this figure, an accountant would multiply with per-piece market rate, for example Rs. 3 per unit.

Closing stock becomes = Rs. 3 multiplied by 225,000 units = Rs. 675,000.

Banks give loans at a specific margin rates. If this margin is 10% then for a loan of Rs. 100,000, a company needs to maintain stock with a value of Rs. 100,000 + (10% of 100,000) = Rs. 110,000. If the stock goes below 110,000 then the bank may take the stocks from the debtor company.
