= Earnings before interest and taxes =

Measure of a firm's profit

In accounting and finance, earnings before interest and taxes (EBIT) is a measure of a firm's profit that includes all incomes and expenses (operating and non-operating) except interest expenses and income tax expenses.

Operating income and operating profit are sometimes used as a synonym for EBIT when a firm does not have non-operating income and non-operating expenses.

== Formula ==
- EBIT = (net income) + interest + taxes = EBITDA – (depreciation and amortization expenses)
- Operating income = (gross income) – OPEX = EBIT – (non-operating profit) + (non-operating expenses)

where

- EBITDA = earnings before interest, taxes, depreciation, and amortization
- OPEX = operating expense

== Overview ==
A professional investor contemplating a change to the capital structure of a firm (e.g., through a leveraged buyout) first evaluates a firm's fundamental earnings potential (reflected by earnings before interest, taxes, depreciation and amortization (EBITDA) and EBIT), and then determines the optimal use of debt versus equity (equity value).

To calculate EBIT, expenses (e.g. the cost of goods sold, selling and administrative expenses) are subtracted from revenues. Net income is later obtained by subtracting interest and taxes from the result.

Example statement of income (figures in thousands)
Revenue
Sales revenue	$20,438
Cost of goods sold	$7,943
Gross profit	$12,495
Operating expenses
Selling, general and administrative expenses	$8,172
Depreciation and amortization	$960
Other expenses	$138
Total operating expenses	$9,270
Operating profit	$3,225
Non-operating income	$130
Earnings before interest and taxes (EBIT)	$3,355
Financial income	$45
Income before interest expense (IBIE)	$3,400
Financial expense	$190
Earnings before income taxes (EBT)	$3,210
Income taxes	$1,027
Net income	$2,183

== Earnings before taxes ==
Earnings before taxes (EBT) is the money retained by the firm before deducting the money to be paid for taxes. EBT excludes the money paid for interest. Thus, it can be calculated by subtracting the interest from EBIT (earnings before interest and taxes).

== See also ==
- Earnings before interest, taxes, and amortization (EBITA)
- Earnings before interest, taxes, and depreciation (EBITD)
- Earnings before interest, taxes, depreciation, amortization, and restructuring or rent costs (EBITDAR)
- Earnings before interest, taxes, depreciation, and amortization (EBITDA)
- EV/EBITDA
- Operating income before depreciation and amortization (OIBDA)
