= Available for sale =

Available for sale (AFS) is an accounting term used to classify financial assets. AFS is one of the three general classifications, along with held for trading and held to maturity, under U.S. Generally Accepted Accounting Principles (US GAAP), specifically FAS 115. The IFRS also includes a fourth classification: loans and receivables.

== US GAAP Treatment ==
Under US GAAP, AFS assets represent debt securities and other financial investments that are non-strategic, that are neither held for trading, nor held to maturity, nor held for strategic reasons, and that have a readily available market price. As such, the gains and losses resulting from marking AFS investments to market (revaluing them to market price / fair value each period) are not included in Net Income (unlike the gains and losses associated with "trading" investments) but are reflected in Other Comprehensive Income (income statement / retained earnings) and Accumulated Other Comprehensive Income (balance sheet) until they are realized (sold).

== IFRS Treatment ==
Under IFRS, AFS assets are defined as being all financial assets that do not fall into one of the other classifications. As such, the treatment closely follows that of US GAAP. Gains or losses from revaluation of the asset are put through Other Comprehensive Income in Shareholders' Equity, except to the extent that any losses are assessed as being permanent and the asset is therefore impaired (under IAS 39, paragraph 58), or if the asset is sold or otherwise disposed of. If the asset is impaired, sold or otherwise disposed of, the revaluation gain or loss implicit in the transaction is recognised as an income or expense.

Starting in 2018, this treatment will be overridden by IFRS 9, according to which, for equity instruments, the revaluation gain or loss will be recognized under Other Comprehensive Income whether it be due to normal market fluctuations or impairment. Further, the revaluation gains or losses on equity instruments from Other Comprehensive Income will under no circumstances be recycled into Profit and Loss.

== See also ==
- Accompanying notes to the financial statements
- Accounting standard
- Financial asset
- Balance sheet
- Other comprehensive income
