= Trading statement =

The trading statement is an expanded version of sales portion of the Income statement. The trading statement's main objective is to determine sales, cost of sales and gross profit. The trading statement is part of effective book keeping within the accounting discipline.

== Primary formula ==
Sales - Cost of Sales = Gross Profit

== Cost of sales ==
The main parts of a cost of sales calculation consists of:

- Opening inventories (The amount of inventories that the entity has on hand from the previous year)
- + Purchases (The amount of inventories that the entity purchases over the course of the year)
- = Goods available for sale (Opening inventories + Purchases +/- other items)
- - Closing inventories (Inventory on hand at the end of the year)

== Example ==
- Question:

A business entity purchases £10400 worth of equipment in order to construct computers. During the financial year, £1400 worth of equipment is returned to the entity by its customers as the equipment was determined to be faulty. The previous financial year, the entity had £3000 worth of equipment left over. The entity makes use of a trucking company to deliver all of its goods. The trucking company charges the entity £120 for the year to deliver the equipment. The entity sold £14500 worth of items during the year to various customers. The entity checked its inventory stock levels at the end of the year and determined that there was £2000 worth of inventories left over.

- Solution:

Sales calculation:

Sales = Sales for the year - Returns in (Goods that were returned to the entity during the course of the year)
Sales = £14500 - £1400
Sales = £13100

Cost of sales calculation:

Cost of sales	£
Opening inventories	£3000
+ Purchases	£10400
+ Freight (in)	£120
= Goods available for sale	£13520
Closing inventories	(£2000)

Therefore, Cost of sales = Goods available for sale - Closing inventory
Cost of sales = £13520 - £2000
Cost of sales = £11520

Gross profit calculation: Gross profit = Sales - Cost of sales
Gross profit = £13100 - £11520
Gross profit = £1580

== Ratio calculation ==
Often, information in the trading statement is left out and it is up to the bookkeeper to determine the missing value. This is a very popular bookkeeping examination type question. The best way to go about solving the unknown variable being either sales, cost of sales, or gross profit is to make use of a ratio calculation.

=== Want/Have method ===
Using the example above, we can clearly determine all three variables (sales, cost of sales, and gross profit), as all of the information is provided in the question. If for instance, the question did not stipulate both the sales and the cost of sales figures, though the gross profit figure was given, a ratio calculation can then be performed.
For a ratio calculation, the question will have additional information regarding the mark-up percentages of the sales, cost of sales, and gross profit figures.
