= Total absorption costing =

Total absorption costing (TAC) is a method of cost accounting which takes account of the full cost of manufacturing a product or providing a service. TAC includes not just the costs of materials and labour, but also of all manufacturing overheads (whether "fixed" or "variable"). Areas of cost may be described as either "direct" or "indirect": direct costs can be easily identified with individual cost centers, whereas indirect costs cannot be easily identified with the cost center. The distribution of overheads between cost centers is called "apportionment". Absorption costing includes all manufacturing costs (direct materials, direct labour, and overheads) in unit product costs. According to the ICMA London, "absorption costing is a principle whereby fixed as well as variable costs are allocated to cost unit the term may be applied where production costs only or costs of all function are so allocated".

Absorption costing and marginal costing are two key costing methods which are often compared. The Association of Chartered Certified Accountants (ACCA) notes that "both methods have their advantages and limitations, and choosing the appropriate one depends on the business context and objectives".

== Primary apportionment or distribution of overheads ==
The selection of the base on which overheads are or should be apportioned depends on the following principles:

- Service or use basis: If the benefit obtained by various departments from the overheads can be measured, overheads can be apportioned on that basis.
- Survey basis: If amount of overhead cannot be measured then survey basis can be applied. For example, if it can be noted that a supervisor is giving 60% of their time to one department and 40% to another, their wage can be apportioned on that basis.
- Ability to pay basis: In this case the apportionment may depend on the factors like total sale/profitability. This may not always be a fair case, as some departments may have to take most of the burden.

== Secondary apportionment ==
With the process of primary apportionment or distribution, the loading of overheads for all the departments i.e. production as well as service departments can be obtained. The next step is to transfer the overheads of non-production departments to the production departments, as the various cost centers move through the production departments only.

=== Absorption ===
Each job while moving through the production department should get its share of overhead. This process of distribution of overheads is called absorption. There can be a number of methods of absorption of overheads, consideration should be given to the type of industry, manufacturing process, nature of industry etc. The various methods of absorption are

- Direct material cost percentage rate
- Direct labour cost percentage rate
- Prime cost percentage rate
- Labour hour rate
- Machine hour rate

=== Direct material cost percentage rate ===
In this method overhead is calculated as a percentage of the material cost. This is used where the material cost is high and of prime importance. Here other costs are negligible or are dependent on the material cost. This is calculated as (Amount of overhead/Material cost) x 100 If the production overhead is 3,000 and the material cost is 10,000 then the absorption rate will be

(3000/10000) x 100 = 30%

Now for a product if the material cost is 1000 then the overhead cost is 300, so the total cost would be 1300. The classic example of and industry using this type of absorption are gold jewelers the typical absorption rate varies from 2-5% of the cost of the gold. If the cost of the material fluctuates this method cannot be used. For this type of absorption the material cost should be stable. If in the same industry material of different cost is used the calculation becomes unjustified, especially when the cost of the material differ too much.

=== Direct labour cost percentage rate ===
In this method cost is absorbed as a percent of the labour cost or the wages. (Overhead cost/Labour cost) x 100 If the Labour cost is 5000 and the overhead cost is 1000 then the absorption cost is 20%. If the labour cost of one job is 500 it will have to absorb 20% i.e. 100 as the overhead cost making the total cost to be 600. This method can be used in service industry where the major input is the skilled or unskilled labour. For the proper calculation labour rates need to be constant and the skill and efficiency of the labourer need to be identical.

=== Prime cost percentage rate ===
In this method both material cost as well as labour cost is the base for calculating the overhead absorption. It is calculated as (Overhead Cost/Prime cost) x 100. Prime cost is nothing but the sum of direct material cost and direct labour cost.

=== Labour hour rate ===
This method is mostly used if the industry is labour-intensive and the labour is mostly unskilled or semiskilled. It is calculated as (overhead cost/ Labour hours required for production) if the labour hour required is 1000 and the overhead to be absorbed is 250 then the rate is .25 per labour hour. if 20 labour hours are required to complete a job then the overhead will be 5.

=== Machine hour rate ===
If the industry considered has a high degree of automation and mechanization then this method can be used. Here the major chunk of the cost comes from the utilization of the machines. it is calculated as (overhead cost/ number of machine hours). This is very useful if the running cost of the machines including rent are the dominant part of the cost of the product.

One of the main reasons for absorbing overheads into the cost of is for inventory valuation purposes. Absorption costing is permissible under GAAP.

Traditional TAC was developed in the age of manufacturing and mostly used to arrive at the full manufacturing cost of producing goods; an alternative method of arriving at full cost known as activity-based costing (ABC) is often thought to be more appropriate for services. Absorption costing is a means of incorporating a fair share of indirect cost or overheads into the cost of a unit of product or service provided.

== See also ==
- Variable costing
