= Equity method =

Equity method in accounting is the process of treating investments in associate companies. Equity accounting is usually applied where an investor entity holds 20–50% of the voting shares of the associate company, and therefore has significant influence on the latter's management. Under International Financial Reporting Standards, equity method is also required in accounting for joint ventures. The investor records such investments as an asset on its balance sheet. The investor's proportional share of the associate company's net income increases the investment (and a net loss decreases the investment), and proportional payments of dividends decrease it. In the investor’s income statement Equity accounting may also be appropriate where the investor has a smaller interest, depending on the nature of the actual relationship between the investor and investee. Control of the investee, usually through ownership of more than 50% of voting shares, results in recognition of a subsidiary, whose financial statements must be consolidated with the parent's. The ownership of less than 20% creates an investment position, carried at historic book or fair market value (if available for sale or held for trading) in the investor's balance sheet.

== See also ==
- Business valuation
- Enterprise value
- Minority interest
