= Reserve (accounting) =

Accounting

In financial accounting, reserve always has a credit balance and can refer to a part of shareholders' equity, a liability for estimated claims, or contra-asset for uncollectible accounts.

A reserve can appear in any part of shareholders' equity except for contributed or basic share capital. In nonprofit accounting, an "operating reserve" is the unrestricted cash on hand available to sustain an organization, and nonprofit boards usually specify a target of maintaining several months of operating cash or a percentage of their annual income, called an operating reserve ratio.

== Types of reserves in accounting treatment ==
There are different types of reserves used in financial accounting, including capital reserves, revenue reserves, statutory reserves, realized reserves, unrealized reserves.

Equity reserves are created from several possible sources:

- Reserves created from shareholders' contributions, the most common examples of which are:
  - legal reserve fund – it is required in many laws and it must be paid as a percentage of share capital
  - share premium – amount paid by shareholders for shares in excess of their nominal value.
    Within the framework of capital increase by share premium a larger proportion of capital increase is placed into a capital reserve while the subscribed capital is increased by a minimum amount. This is because the initial losses are covered by the capital reserve. If capital increase was carried out fully or to a significant degree through the increase of subscribed capital, equity could easily fall to below the subscribed capital due to the losses.
- Reserves created from profit, especially retained earnings, i.e. accumulated accounting profits, or in the case of nonprofits, operating surpluses. However, profits may be distributed also to other types of reserves, for example:
  - legal reserve fund from profit – many legislations require creation of the fund as a percentage of profits
  - remuneration reserve – will be used later to pay bonuses to employees or management.
  - translation reserve – arises during consolidation of entities with different reporting currencies

Reserve is the profit achieved by a company where a certain amount of it is put back into the business which can help the business in their rainy days. The preceding sentence may give the unwary reader the sense that this item is an asset, a debit balance. This is false. A reserve is always a credit balance. Retained Earnings typically has a credit balance. If a firm wants to label part of Retained Earnings as a Reserve for Reinvestment, then that labeling does not harm, but neither does it do anything about making assets, liquid or otherwise, available for any day, rainy or otherwise.

Sometimes reserve is used in the sense of provision. This is inconsistent with the terminology suggested by International Accounting Standards Board. For more information about provisions, see provision (accounting). The preceding is, indeed, correct IASB usage, but be aware in the U.S., under U.S. Generally Accepted Accounting Principles, "provision" refers to a debit balance, not a credit balance. "Provision" is a dangerous word to use in attempting to achieve clear communications in conversations with U.S. and IASB conversations. "Provision for Income Taxes" means expense in U.S. GAAP and liability in IASB vernacular.

== Ideal operating reserves ==
There is no single ideal operating reserve ratio. The purpose of the reserve is to keep the organization intact and to continue providing services during a temporary financial shock. The reserves need to be large enough to support all normal operating activities during an unexpected decline in income.

A large organization that has a steady, reliable income source is unlikely to burn through more than about three months' expenses during an unexpected financial shock. A smaller organization (e.g., less than US$1,000,000 per year) or one with volatile income sources could be vulnerable even if it had more than six months' expenses in reserve. Grantmakers, for example, frequently maintain operating reserves of more than 12 months because their income often depends on a volatile stock market. A large animal protection organization has about a 10% chance of losing a quarter of their revenue during a year, which would require about three months' reserves to cover, and a 1% risk of losing half their revenue during a difficult year, which would require reserves equal to six months' expenses. Small animal protection organizations have more volatile income patterns, so they need higher reserves, potentially exceeding more than a year's worth of expenses.

== See also ==
- Accumulated other comprehensive income
- Balance sheet
