= IAS 7 =

International Accounting Standard 7: Statement of Cash Flows or IAS 7 is an accounting standard that establishes standards for cash flow reporting used in International Financial Reporting Standards.

A statement of cash flows for the periods, is an integral "Component of financial statements" as per IAS 1 — Presentation of Financial Statements.

== History of IAS 7 ==
IAS 7 was reissued in December 1992, retitled in September 2007, and is operative for financial statements covering periods beginning on or after 1 January 1994.

June 1976	Exposure Draft E7 Statement of Source and Application of Funds
October 1977	IAS 7 Statement of Changes in Financial Position
July 1991	Exposure Draft E36 Cash Flow Statements
December 1992	IAS 7 (1992) Cash Flow Statements
1 January 1994	Effective date of IAS 7 (1992)
6 September 2007	Retitled from Cash Flow Statements to Statement of Cash Flows as a consequential amendment resulting from revisions to IAS 1
16 April 2009	IAS 7 amended by Annual Improvements to IFRSs 2009 with respect to expenditures that do not result in a recognised asset.
1 July 2009	Effective date for amendments from IAS 27(2008) relating to changes in ownership of a subsidiary
1 January 2010	Effective date of the April 2009 revisions to IAS 7
