= Accumulated other comprehensive income =

Note: Reference cited below, FAS130, remains the most current accounting literature in the United States on this topic.

In 1997 the United States Financial Accounting Standards Board issued Statement on Financial Accounting Standards No. 130 entitled "Reporting Comprehensive Income". This statement required all income statement items to be reported either as a regular item in the income statement or a special item as other comprehensive income. It is commonly referred to as FAS130. The International Accounting Standards Board issued the International Accounting Standard 1 with slightly different terminology but a conceptually identical meaning.

== Comprehensive income ==
Comprehensive income (IAS 1: "Total Comprehensive Income") is the total non-owner change in equity for a reporting period. This change encompasses all changes in equity other than transactions from owners and distributions to owners. Most of these changes appear in the income statement. A few special types of gains and losses are not shown in the income statement but as special items in shareholder equity section of the balance sheet.

Since these comprehensive income items are not closed to retained earnings each period they accumulate as shareholder equity items and thus are entitled "Accumulated Other Comprehensive Income" and is sometimes referred to as "AOCI".

Accumulated other comprehensive income is a subsection in equity where "other comprehensive income" is accumulated (summed or "aggregated").

The balance of AOCI is presented in the Equity section of the Balance Sheet as is the Retained Earnings balance, which aggregates past and current Earnings, and past and current Dividends.

== Other comprehensive income ==
Other comprehensive income is the difference between net income as in the income statement (profit or loss Account) and comprehensive income, and represents the certain gains and losses of the enterprise not recognized in the P&L Account. It is commonly referred to as "OCI" although the word comprehensive has no meaning as can be seen from the definitory equation. OCI when translated into another language and back into English means "other income" only.

In practice, it comprises the following items:

1. Unrealized gains and losses on available for sale securities [IAS 39/ "FAS 115" – "Accounting for Certain Investments in Debt Securities"]
2. Gains and losses on derivatives held as cash flow hedges (only for effective portions) [IAS 39/ "FAS 133" – "Accounting for Derivative Instruments and Hedging Activities"]
3. Gains and losses resulting from translating the financial statements of foreign subsidiaries (from foreign currency to the presentation currency) [IAS 21/ "FAS 52" – "Foreign Currency Translation"],
4. Actuarial gains and losses on defined benefit plans recognized (Minimum pension liability adjustments) [IAS 19/ "FAS 158" – "Employers' Accounting For Defined Benefit Pension And Other Postretirement Plans"]
5. Changes in the revaluation surplus [IAS 16 and IAS 38].

While the AOCI balance is presented in Equity section of the balance sheet, the annual accounting entries, as flows, are presented sometimes in a Statement of Comprehensive Income. This statement expands the traditional income statement beyond earnings to include OCI in order to present comprehensive income.

Under the revised IAS 1, all non-owner changes in equity (comprehensive income) must be presented either in one Statement of comprehensive income or in two statements (a separate income statement and a statement of comprehensive income).

=== Reclassification to profit or loss (P&L) ===
Flows presented initially in OCI sometimes are reclassified into Earnings (Profit or Loss) when certain conditions are met. For the five types of OCI described above, the triggers for reclassification are presented in the accounting standard that gives rise to the OCI flow.

=== Alterations to definition of OCI ===
In the United States further alterations to this OCI definition occur when a new standard (including a revision of a previously issued accounting standard) identifies an item that can be measured, should be measured in the financial statements, represents a "flow" variable rather than a stock, or snapshot, variable, and does not represent a flow variable that should be presented in the Income Statement as a component of Earnings. The flow variable that is both measurable and should be recognized is then added to the list above of items that a reporting entity would include in AOCI.

In the third quarter of 2008 the United States Securities and Exchange Commission received several proposals to allow the recognition in AOCI of certain fair value changes on financial instruments. This proposal was initially well received by representatives of the banking community who felt that Earnings recognition of these fair value changes during the concurrent "credit meltdown of 2008" would be inappropriate. The effect of this proposal, on balance, would be to remove sizeable losses from Earnings and thus Retained Earnings of banks, and assist them in preserving their regulatory capital. The regulatory capital of banks in the US and generally worldwide includes contributed equity capital and retained earnings but excludes AOCI, even though it is reported as a component of the Equity section of the Balance Sheet.

The FASB released an Accounting Standards Update on January 5, 2016 that changes items reported in OCI. Previously, equity securities could be classified as available for sale, and unrecognized gains and losses on these securities appeared in OCI. However, per this update, there is no longer an available for sale classification for equity securities if the fair value of these securities can be readily determined. Changes in the fair value of equity investments in unconsolidated entities flow through earnings for fiscal years beginning after December 15, 2017.

== See also ==
- Balance sheet
- Comprehensive income
- Hedge accounting
- Reserve (accounting)
- Statement of comprehensive income
