= IFRS 5 =

Financial reporting standard: non-current assets, discontinued operations

IFRS 5 refers to the International Financial Reporting Standards relating to non-current assets held for sale and discontinued operations.

== Non-current assets held for sale ==
If a non-current asset is 'held for sale', the economic benefit of that asset is obtained through the asset's sale rather than through its continuous use in the business (future economic benefit). Such assets cease to be depreciated as they are no longer being consumed by the business. Moreover, an asset held for sale is valued at the lower of either:

- the asset's carrying cost; or
- the asset's fair value less the cost of selling this asset.

Non-current assets 'held for sale' should be presented separately on the face of the statement of financial position as a current asset.

For a non-current asset (Fixed Asset) to be classified as 'held for sale', all of the following 4 conditions must be satisfied:

- The asset must be available for immediate sale in its present condition and location; and
- The asset's sale is expected to be completed within 12 months of classification as 'held for sale'; and
- There must be no expectation that the plan for selling the asset will be withdrawn or changed significantly; and
- The successful sale of the asset must be highly probable, signified by both:

- The management's commitment to the asset-selling plan; and
- Existence of active marketing to support the sale of the asset.

The management's decision is also required for that sale proceeds and then the Fair value could be ascertained.

== Discontinued operations ==
A discontinued operation is a component of an enterprise that has either been disposed of, or is classified as 'held for sale', and:

- represents a separate major line of business or geographical area of operations; and
- is part of a single, co-ordinated plan to dispose of this separate major line of business or geographical area of operations; or
- is a subsidiary acquired exclusively with a view to resale.

If there is any gain or loss from sale of assets it should be recognised in the statement of comprehensive income.
