= Holding gains =

Holding gains are generally defined as increases in the replacement costs of the assets held during a given period. Holding gains and losses accrue to the owners of assets and liabilities purely as a result of holding the assets or liabilities over time, without transforming them in any way.

For example, if a company holds bottles of wine in its inventory and that specific wine becomes more expensive on the market, the replacement cost of the wine in the inventory increases as it has become more expensive for the company to replace its current stock of wine. Thus, by merely holding the wine in the inventory, the assets of the company have risen in value.

There are different types of holding gains and the types depend on the accounting system the company uses or may use. Holding gains are most frequently used in inflation accounting and income measurement. For instance holding gains or losses can result from depreciation, stock, gearing adjustments or monetary working capital adjustments.

Holding gains can be realized (e.g., sold goods) or unrealized (e.g. stock).

== See also ==
- Capital appreciation
- Depreciation
