= Notes receivable =

Claims for payment

Notes receivable represents claims for which formal instruments of credit are issued as evidence of debt, such as a promissory note. The credit instrument normally requires the debtor to pay interest and extends for time periods of 30 days or longer. Notes receivable are considered current assets if they are to be paid within one year, and non-current if they are expected to be paid after one year.

== Measurement ==
In concept, notes receivables are initially measured at present value. When referring to the present value, it means the sum of all future cash flows discounted using the prevailing market rate of interest for similar notes. In terms of short-term notes receivable, it is measured at face value.

The initial measurement of long-term notes receivable depends on whether the notes are interest-bearing or noninterest-bearing.

Interest-bearing notes have a specified interest rate payable on top of their face value. Notes with rates below market rates, or those with no stated interest (noninterest-bearing notes), may still have an implicit interest component. This implicit interest is the difference between the borrowed amount and the repayment amount, and it is included to make the notes more attractive for sale.

=== Journalizing dishonoured notes receivable ===
In a journal entry, a dishonored note is one that the maker did not pay by its due date. When this happens, the payee transfers the note from Notes Receivable to Accounts Receivable. The payee should debit Accounts Receivable for the full amount due, credit Notes Receivable for the note's face value, and credit Interest Revenue for the interest earned.
