= Deferred tax =

Accounting liability

Deferred tax is a notional asset or liability to reflect corporate income taxation on a basis that is the same or more similar to recognition of profits than the taxation treatment. Deferred tax liabilities can arise as a result of corporate taxation treatment of capital expenditure being more rapid than the accounting depreciation treatment. Deferred tax assets can arise due to net loss carry-overs, which are only recorded as asset if it is deemed more likely than not that the asset will be used in future fiscal periods. Different countries may also allow or require discounting of the assets or particularly liabilities. There are often disclosure requirements for potential liabilities and assets that are not actually recognised as an asset or liability.

== Permanent and Temporary differences ==
If an item in the profit and loss account is never chargeable or allowable for tax or is chargeable or allowable for tax purposes but never appears in the profit and loss account then this is a permanent difference. A permanent difference does not give rise to deferred tax.

If items are chargeable or allowable for tax purposes but in different periods to when the income or expense is recognised then this gives rise to temporary differences. Temporary difference do give rise to potential deferred tax, but the rules on whether the deferred asset or liability is actually recognised can vary.

Temporary differences are usually calculated on the differences between the carrying amount of an asset or liability recognized in the statements of financial position and the amount attributed to that asset or liability for tax at the beginning and end of the year. The differences in the charges to the profit and loss account compared to the amounts taxable or allowable can also be calculated and should reconcile the change in position at the beginning and end of the year.

== Example ==
The basic principle of accounting for deferred tax under a temporary difference approach can be illustrated using a common example in which a company has fixed assets that qualify for tax depreciation.

The following example assumes that a company purchases an asset for $1,000 which is depreciated for accounting purposes on a straight-line basis of five years of $200/year. The company claims tax depreciation of 25% per year on a reducing balance basis. The applicable rate of corporate income tax is assumed to be 35%, and the net value is subtracted.

	Purchase	Year 1	Year 2	Year 3	Year 4
Accounting value	$1,000	$800	$600	$400	$200
Tax value	$1,000	$750	$563	$422	$316
Taxable/(deductible) temporary difference	$0	$50	$37	$(22)	$(116)
Deferred tax liability/(asset) at 35%	$0	$18	$13	$(8)	$(41)

As the tax value, or tax base, is lower than the accounting value, or book value, in years 1 and 2, the company should recognize a deferred tax liability. This also reflects that the company has claimed tax depreciation in excess of the expense for accounting depreciation recorded in its accounts, whereas in the future the company should claim less tax depreciation in total than accounting depreciation in its accounts.

In years 3 and 4, the tax value exceeds the accounting value, therefore the company should recognise a deferred tax asset (subject to it having sufficient forecast profits so that it is able to use future tax deductions). This reflects that the company expects to be able to claim tax depreciation in excess of accounting depreciation.

== Timing differences ==
In many cases the deferred tax outcome will be similar for a temporary difference or timing difference approach. However, differences can arise such as in relation to revaluation of fixed assets qualifying for tax depreciation, which gives rise to a deferred tax asset under a balance sheet approach, but in general should have no impact under a timing difference approach.

== Justification for deferred tax accounting ==
Deferred tax is relevant to the matching principle.

== Examples ==
=== Deferred tax liabilities ===
Deferred tax liabilities generally arise where tax relief is provided in advance of an accounting expense/unpaid liabilities, or income is accrued but not taxed until received.

=== Deferred tax assets ===
Deferred tax assets generally arise where tax relief is provided after an expense is deducted for accounting purposes:

- a company may accrue an accounting expense in relation to a provision such as bad debts, but tax relief may not be obtained until the provision is utilized;
- a company may incur tax losses and be able to "carry forward" losses to reduce taxable income in future years.

An asset on a company's balance sheet that may be used to reduce any subsequent period's income tax expense. Deferred tax assets can arise due to net loss carryover.

== Deferred tax in modern accounting standards ==
Modern accounting standards typically require that a company provides for deferred tax in accordance with either the temporary difference or timing difference approach. Where a deferred tax liability or asset is recognised, the liability or asset should reduce over time (subject to new differences arising) as the temporary or timing difference reverses.

Under International Financial Reporting Standards, deferred tax should be accounted for using the principles in IAS 12: Income Taxes, which is similar (but not identical) to SFAS 109 under US GAAP. Both these accounting standards require a temporary difference approach.

Other accounting standards which deal with deferred tax include:

- UK GAAP - Financial Reporting Standard 19: Deferred Tax (timing difference approach)
- Mexican GAAP or NIF - NIF D-4, Impuestos a la utilidad
- Canadian GAAP - CICA Section 3465
- Russian PBU 18 (2002) Accounting for profit tax (timing difference approach)
- INDIAN AS - Institute Of Charted Account of India -AS 22 Accounting for taxes on income

== Derecognition of deferred tax assets and liabilities ==
Management has an obligation to accurately report the true state of the company, and to make judgements and estimations where necessary. In the context of tax assets and liabilities, there must be a reasonable likelihood that the tax difference may be realised in future years.

For example, a tax asset may appear on the company's accounts due to losses in previous years (if carry-forward of tax losses is allowed). In this case a deferred tax asset should be recognised if and only if the management considered that there will be sufficient future taxable profit to use the tax loss. If it becomes clear that the company does not expect to make profits in future years, the value of the tax asset has been impaired: in the estimation of management, the likelihood that this tax loss can be used in the future has significantly fallen.

In cases where the carrying value of tax assets or liabilities has changed, the company may need to do a write-down, and in certain cases involving in particular a fundamental error, a restatement of its financial results from previous years. Such write-downs may involve either significant income or expenditure being recorded in the company's profit and loss for the financial year in which the write-down takes place.

== See also ==
- Deferred financing costs
- Tax shield
