= Net income =

Measure of the profitability of a business venture

In business and accounting, net income is an entity's income minus cost of goods sold, expenses, depreciation and amortization, interest, and taxes, and other expenses for an accounting period. It is computed as the residual of all revenues and gains less all expenses and losses for the period, and has also been defined as the net increase in shareholders' equity that results from a company's operations. It is different from gross income, which only deducts the cost of goods sold from revenue.

For households and individuals, net income is the (gross) income minus taxes and other deductions (e.g. mandatory pension contributions).

== Definition ==
Net income can be distributed among holders of common stock as a dividend or held by the firm as an addition to retained earnings. As profit and earnings are used synonymously for income (also depending on UK and US usage), net earnings and net profit are commonly found as synonyms for net income. Often, the term income is substituted for net income, yet this is not preferred due to the possible ambiguity. Net income is informally called the bottom line because it is typically found on the last line of a company's income statement (a related term is top line, meaning revenue, which forms the first line of the account statement).

In simplistic terms, net profit is the money left over after paying all the expenses of an endeavor. In practice this can get very complex in large organizations. The bookkeeper or accountant must itemise and allocate revenues and expenses properly to the specific working scope and context in which the term is applied.

Net income is usually calculated per annum, for each fiscal year. The items deducted will typically include tax expense, financing expense (interest expense), and minority interest. Likewise, preferred stock dividends will be subtracted too, though they are not an expense. For a merchandising company, subtracted costs may be the cost of goods sold, sales discounts, and sales returns and allowances. For a product company, advertising, manufacturing, & design and development costs are included. Net income can also be calculated by adding a company's operating income to non-operating income and then subtracting off taxes.

The net profit margin percentage is a related ratio. This figure is calculated by dividing net profit by revenue or turnover, and it represents profitability, as a percentage.

Net income is an important indicator for investors, as it helps assess a company's profitability and determine whether investing in the company is justified.

Net income is used in calculating earnings per share (EPS), which measures the portion of a company's profit attributable to each share of common stock. However, net income is an accrual-based measure and may include non-cash items and one-time gains or losses. Consequently, it is commonly evaluated together with cash flow and other financial indicators.

== An equation for net income ==
Net profit: To calculate net profit for a venture (such as a company, division, or project), subtract all costs, including a fair share of total corporate overheads, from the gross revenues or turnover.

$\text{Net Profit} = \text{Sales Revenue} - \text{Total Costs}$

A detailed example of a net income calculation:

$\text{Net Income} = \text{Gross Profit} - \text{Operating Expenses} - \text{Other Business Expenses} - \text{Taxes} - \text{Interest on Debt} + \text{Other Income}$

Net profit is a measure of the fundamental profitability of the venture. "It is the revenues of the activity less the costs of the activity. The main complication is . . . when needs to be allocated" across ventures. "Almost by definition, overheads are costs that cannot be directly tied to any specific" project, product, or division. "The classic example would be the cost of headquarters staff." "Although it is theoretically possible to calculate profits for any sub-(venture), such as a product or region, often the calculations are rendered suspect by the need to allocate overhead costs." Because overhead costs generally do not come in neat packages, their allocation across ventures is not an exact science.

=== Example ===
Net profit on a P & L (profit and loss) account:

1. Sales revenue = price (of product) × quantity sold
2. Gross profit = sales revenue − cost of sales and other direct costs
3. Operating profit = gross profit − overheads and other indirect costs
4. EBIT (earnings before interest and taxes) = Operating profit + Non-operating income (including interest income)
5. EBT (Pretax profit, earnings before taxes) = EBIT − interest expenses − other non-operating expenses
6. Net profit = EBT − tax
7. Addition to Retained earnings = Net profit − dividends

Another equation to calculate net income:

Net sales (revenue) - Cost of goods sold = Gross profit - SG&A expenses (combined costs of operating the company) - Research and development (R&D) = Earnings before interest, taxes, depreciation and amortization (EBITDA) - Depreciation and amortization = Earnings before interest and taxes (EBIT) - Interest expense (cost of borrowing money) = Earnings before taxes (EBT) - Tax expense = Net income (EAT)

Profit margins vary significantly by industry due to differences in cost structures and business models. Technology and professional services typically lead with net profit margins of 15% to 20%, whereas high-volume or capital-intensive sectors like retail, hospitality, and construction generally operate on thinner margins of 2% to 6%.

== Interpretation ==
Net income is an accounting measure and does not represent the amount of cash generated by a company during an accounting period. It may include non-cash items, such as depreciation and amortization, as well as gains or losses that are not related to the company's ordinary operations. For this reason, net income is commonly analyzed together with the statement of cash flows, earnings per share, and other financial indicators.

=== Net loss ===
When a company's expenses and losses exceed its revenues and gains for an accounting period, it reports a net loss rather than net income. For publicly traded companies, net income or net loss is also used in calculating earnings per share (EPS), which represents the portion of profit or loss attributable to each common share.

== Other terms ==
Net sales = gross sales – (customer discounts, returns, and allowances)
Gross profit = net sales – cost of goods sold
Operating profit = gross profit – total operating expenses
Net profit = operating profit – taxes – interest
Net profit = net sales – cost of goods sold – operating expense – taxes – interest

== See also ==
- Cost of goods sold – Carrying value of goods sold during a particular period
- Dividend – Payment made by a corporation to its shareholders
- Economic value added – Value of a firm's profit after deduction of capital costs
- Gross income – Sum of all earnings before taxes
- Gross margin – Gross profit as a percentage (the difference between the sales and the production costs)
- Income statement – Type of financial statement
- Liquidating distribution
- Net income per employee – Calculation of a company's income minus costs
- Operating income – Measure of a firm's profit
- Operating Income Before Depreciation and Amortization (OIBDA) – Accounting measure of a company's profitability
- Opportunity cost – Benefit lost by a choice between options
- Profit (accounting) – Income distributed to BSC
- Profit margin – Ratio between turnover and profit (ratio of net income to net sales)
- Revenue – Total amount of income generated by the sale of goods or services
