= Financial statement =

Formal record of financial activities

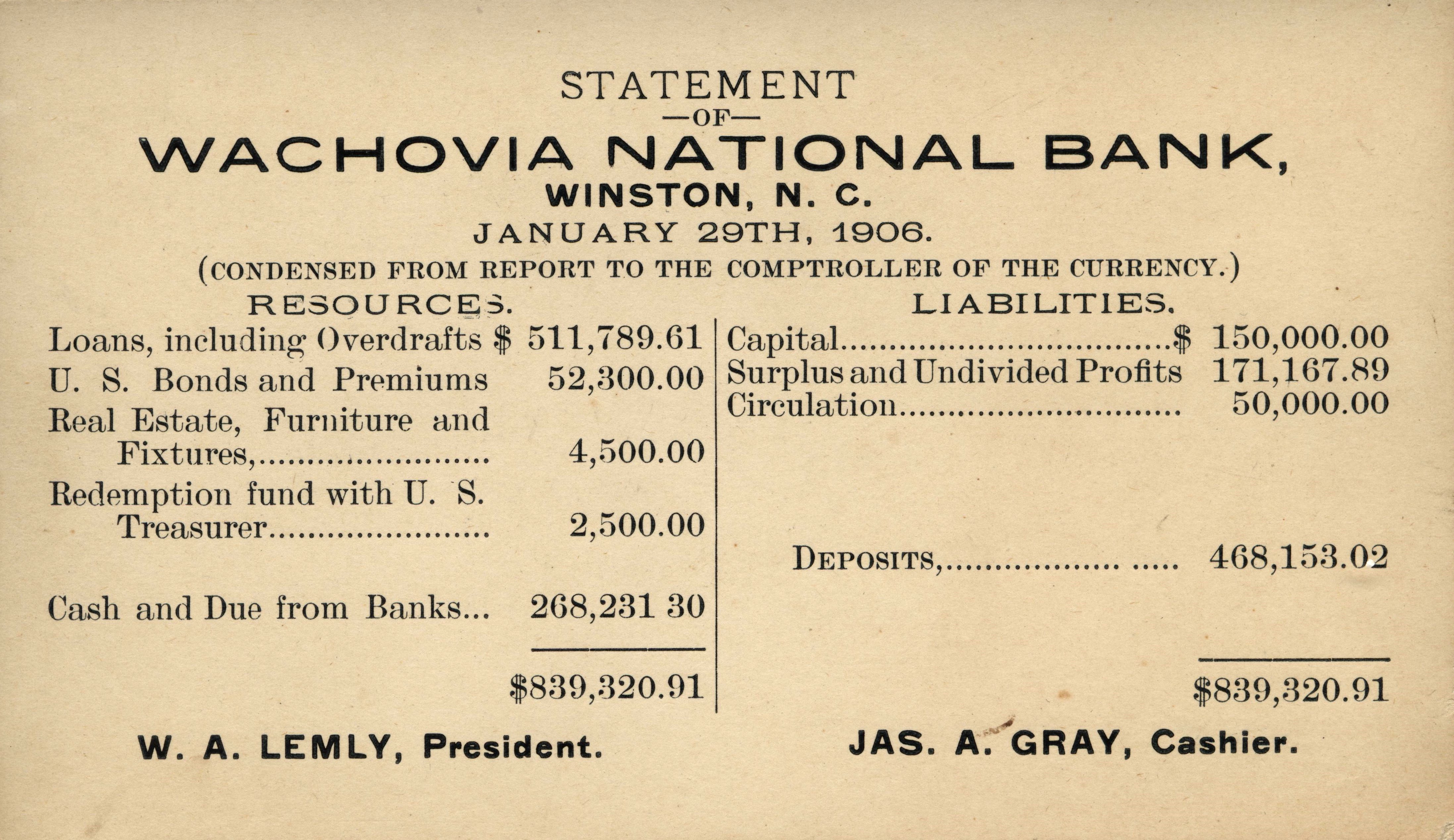
Historical financial statements

In finance and accounting, financial statements (or financial reports) are formal records of the financial activities and position of a business, person, or other entity.

Relevant financial information is presented in a structured manner and in a form which is easy to understand. They typically include four basic financial statements accompanied by a management discussion and analysis:

1. A balance sheet reports on a company's assets, liabilities, and owners' equity at a given point in time.
2. An income statement reports on a company's income, expenses, and profits over a stated period. A profit and loss statement provides information on the operation of the enterprise. These include sales and the various expenses incurred during the stated period.
3. A statement of changes in equity reports on the changes in equity of the company over a stated period.
4. A cash flow statement reports on a company's cash flow activities, particularly its operating, investing, and financing activities over a stated period.

Notably, a balance sheet represents a snapshot in time, whereas the income statement, the statement of changes in equity, and the cash flow statement each represent activities over an accounting period. By understanding the key functional statements within the balance sheet, business owners and financial professionals can make informed decisions that drive growth and stability.

== Purpose of financial statements ==
"The objective of financial statements is to provide information about the financial position, performance and changes in financial position of an enterprise that is useful to a wide range of users in making economic decisions." Financial statements should be understandable, relevant, reliable and comparable. Reported assets, liabilities, equity, income and expenses are directly related to an organization's financial position.

Financial statements are intended to be understandable by readers who have "a reasonable knowledge of business and economic activities and accounting and who are willing to study the information diligently." Financial statements may be used for different purposes:

- Owners and managers require financial statements to make important business decisions that affect its continued operations. Financial analysis is then performed on these statements to provide management with a more detailed understanding of the figures. These statements are also used as part of management's annual report to the stockholders.
- Employees also need these reports in making collective bargaining agreements (CBA) with the management, in the case of labor unions or for individuals in discussing their compensation, promotion and rankings.
- Prospective investors make use of financial statements to assess the viability of investing in a business. Financial analyses are often used by investors and are prepared by professionals (financial analysts), thus providing them with the basis for making investment decisions.
- Financial institutions (banks and other lending companies) use them to decide whether to grant a company with fresh working capital or extend debt securities (such as a long-term bank loan or debentures) to finance expansion and other significant expenditures.
- Stockholders may from time to time request insight into how share capital is managed, which may be made available via financial statements (or stock statements), as it lies in the financial interest of shareowners in affirming that capital stock is handled viably and mindfully with duly care.

== Consolidated ==
Consolidated financial statements are defined as "Financial statements of a group in which the assets, liabilities, equity, income, expenses and cash flows of the parent (company) and its subsidiaries are presented as those of a single economic entity", according to International Accounting Standard 27 "Consolidated and separate financial statements", and International Financial Reporting Standard 10 "Consolidated financial statements".

== Standards and regulations ==
Different countries have developed their own accounting principles over time, making international comparisons of companies difficult. To ensure uniformity and comparability between financial statements prepared by different companies, a set of guidelines and rules are used. Commonly referred to as Generally Accepted Accounting Principles (GAAP), these set of guidelines provide the basis in the preparation of financial statements, although many companies voluntarily disclose information beyond the scope of such requirements.

Recently there has been a push towards standardizing accounting rules made by the International Accounting Standards Board (IASB). IASB develops the International Financial Reporting Standards (IFRS) that have been adopted by Australia, Canada and the European Union (for publicly quoted companies only), are under consideration in South Africa and other countries. The United States Financial Accounting Standards Board has made a commitment to converge the U.S. GAAP and IFRS over time.

== Management discussion and analysis ==
Management discussion and analysis or MD&A is an integrated part of a company's annual financial statements. The purpose of the MD&A is to provide a narrative explanation, through the eyes of management, of how an entity has performed in the past, its financial condition, and its future prospects. In so doing, the MD&A attempt to provide investors with complete, fair, and balanced information to help them decide whether to invest or continue to invest in an entity.

The section contains a description of the year gone by and some of the key factors that influenced the business of the company in that year, as well as a fair and unbiased overview of the company's past, present, and future.

MD&A typically describes the corporation's liquidity position, capital resources, results of its operations, underlying causes of material changes in financial statement items (such as asset impairment and restructuring charges), events of unusual or infrequent nature (such as mergers and acquisitions or share buybacks), positive and negative trends, effects of inflation, domestic and international market risks, and significant uncertainties.

== See also ==
- Accountable Fundraising
- Corporate financial accounting
- Financial statement analysis
- Comprehensive annual financial report
- Model audit
- Earnings report
