= Adjusting entries =

In accounting, adjusting entries are journal entries usually made at the end of an accounting period to allocate income and expenditure to the period in which they actually occurred. The revenue recognition principle is the basis of making adjusting entries that pertain to unearned and accrued revenues under accrual-basis accounting. They are sometimes called Balance Day adjustments because they are made on balance day.

Based on the matching principle of accrual accounting, revenues and associated costs are recognized in the same accounting period. However the actual cash may be received or paid at a different time.

== Types of adjusting entries ==
Most adjusting entries could be classified this way:

	Prepayments (Deferral - cash paid or received before consumption)	Accrual - cash paid or received after consumption
Expenses	Prepaid expenses: for expenses paid in cash and recorded as assets before they are used	Accrued expenses: for expenses incurred but not yet paid in cash and not yet recorded
Revenues	Unearned revenue: for revenues received in cash and recorded as liabilities before they are earned	Accrued revenues: for revenues earned but not yet recorded and not yet received in cash

=== Prepayments ===
Adjusting entries for prepayments are necessary to account for cash that has been received prior to delivery of goods or completion of services. When this cash is paid, it is first recorded in a prepaid expense asset account; the account is to be expensed either with the passage of time (e.g. rent, insurance) or through use and consumption (e.g. supplies).

A company receiving the cash for benefits yet to be delivered will have to record the amount in an unearned revenue liability account. Then, an adjusting entry to recognize the revenue is used as necessary.

==== Example ====
Assume a magazine publishing company charges an annual subscription fee of $12. The cash is paid up-front at the start of the subscription. The income, based on sales basis method, is recognized upon delivery. Therefore, the initial reporting of the receipt of annual subscription fee is indicated as:

                        Debit  |  Credit
                        ----------------
Cash                     $12   |         
  Unearned Revenue             |   $12
                               |

The adjusting entry reporting each month after the delivery is:

                        Debit  |  Credit
                        ----------------
Unearned Revenue           $1  |   
  Revenue                      |    $1  
                               |

The unearned revenue after the first month is therefore $11 and revenue reported in the income statement is $1.

=== Accruals ===
Accrued revenues are revenues that have been recognized (that is, services have been performed or goods have been delivered), but their cash payment have not yet been recorded or received. When the revenue is recognized, it is recorded as a receivable.

Accrued expenses have not yet been paid for, so they are recorded in a payable account. Expenses for interest, taxes, rent, and salaries are commonly accrued for reporting purposes.

An income which has been earned but it has not been received yet during the accounting period. Incomes like rent, interest on investments, commission etc. are examples of accrued income.

=== Estimates ===
A third classification of adjusting entry occurs where the exact amount of an expense cannot easily be determined. The depreciation of fixed assets, for example, is an expense which has to be estimated.

The entry for bad debt expense can also be classified as an estimate.

=== Inventory ===
In a periodic inventory system, an adjusting entry is used to determine the cost of goods sold expense. This entry is not necessary for a company using perpetual inventory.

== See also ==
- Accruals & Deferrals
- Accounting methods
- US Generally Accepted Accounting Principles
- International Financial Reporting Standards
