= Amend v. Commissioner =

American tax court decision

- Court: United States Tax Court
- Full case name: J. D. Amend v. Commissioner of Internal Revenue, et al.
- Decided: August 8, 1949
- Citation: 13 T.C. 178

Court membership
- Judge sitting: Eugene Black

Case opinions
- Decision by: Black

Laws applied
- Internal Revenue Code

Keywords
- Cash method of accounting; Constructive receipt; Realization

Amend v. Commissioner, 13 T.C. 178 (T.C. 1949) is a United States Tax Court decision concerning the timing of the realization of gains.

== Background ==
Petitioners, a husband and wife, were farmers who had contracted to sell an amount of wheat to a purchaser in August 1944. Per the terms of the sale contract, payment for the wheat was not made until January 1945. Petitioners, who used the cash method of accounting, reported gains on the sale of wheat in 1945, when the money was received. The tax commissioner, however, determined that petitioners had an unqualified right to payment as of the delivery of the wheat in August 1944, and should be considered to have realized gains on the sale in the year 1944. Petitioners appealed this decision.

== Holding ==
=== Issues ===
The issue before the court was the factual question of whether the doctrine of constructive receipt should apply to petitioners. This doctrine holds that a taxpayer is subject to tax in the year that he or she gains unfettered control of when items of income will or should be paid. Commissioner held that the Amends had constructively received payment for the wheat in August because, in fact, payment was theirs for the taking any time between August and January. Petitioners argued that they did not, under the contract or in practice, have the ability to demand payment before 1945.

=== Decision ===
The court found that the doctrine of constructive receipt was inappropriate because the contract governing the sale of the wheat was a bona fide, arm's length transaction and petitioners did not have any contractual or practical ability to take control of the payment until 1945.

== Methods of Accounting ==
Petitioners in Amend recognized gain when they received the payment for the wheat and not when they received the promise of eventual payment, because they used the cash method of accounting. Not all businesses internally recognize gains when payment is actually made; those who use the accrual method of accounting would have recognized the gain in 1944 when they provided the good for which they would have been paid in the future. The U.S. Tax Code allows taxpayers to use whichever method of accounting they prefer, and to be taxed on gains when those gains are recognized internally.
