= United States v. Lewis =

- Supreme Court of the United States

Argued March 2, 1951 Decided March 26, 1951
- Full case name: United States v. Lewis
- Docket no.: 347
- Citations: 340 U.S. 590 (more)

Case history
- Prior: verdict for plaintiff, 91 F.Supp. 1017 (1950)

Holding
- The claim of right doctrine requires taxpayers to pay taxes on income they claim as a matter of right and treat as their own, even if they later are found liable to pay it back.

Court membership
- Chief Justice Fred M. Vinson Associate Justices Hugo Black · Stanley F. Reed; Felix Frankfurter · William O. Douglas; Robert H. Jackson · Harold H. Burton; Tom C. Clark · Sherman Minton

Case opinions
- Majority: Black, joined by Vinson, Reed, Frankfurter, Jackson, Burton, Clark, Minton
- Dissent: Douglas

Laws applied
- Internal Revenue Code, North American Oil Consolidated v. Burnet

United States v. Lewis, 340 U.S. 590 (1951), was a decision by the Supreme Court of the United States affirming the claim of right doctrine in income tax law. A lower court had ordered the Internal Revenue Service (IRS) to issue a refund to man who, after other litigation found his bonus to have been miscalculated, was forced to return some of his income from a previous year to his former employer. The Supreme Court ruled that because the man had complete control of the money, his tax payment was correct and he could not get a refund—though he could still claim it as a loss on a subsequent tax return.

== Background ==
Mr. Lewis was a general manager for the Accurate Spring Manufacturing Company from 1939 until 1945. His compensation was a combination of a salary and a bonus, which was calculated as a percentage of the company's profits. As general manager, Lewis controlled the payment of his own bonus, but the amount of the bonus became a point of friction between him and the company's president. After he was fired in 1945, there was a lawsuit between Lewis and the company, with Lewis claiming his last bonus (for 1944) should have been larger, and the company counterclaiming that it should have been lower. The court in that case ruled that Lewis had calculated the bonus based on the company's gross profits, but it should have been calculated based on the net profits; Lewis was thus ordered to pay back about $11,000.

== The case before the Court of Claims ==
Since he had already paid taxes for his 1944 income, Lewis sued in the United States Court of Claims to get the IRS to refund the amount he had paid on the $11,000. The government argued that the amount was properly considered income in 1944. He had received the money and treated it as his own, therefore it was income under the ruling of North American Oil Consolidated v. Burnet. The Supreme Court in North American Oil had stated:

If a taxpayer receives earnings under a claim of right and without restriction as to its disposition, he has received income which he is required to return, even though it may still be claimed that he is not entitled to retain the money, and even though he may still be adjudged liable to restore its equivalent.

— North American Oil Consolidated v. Burnet, 286 U.S. 417, 424 (1932) (Justice Brandeis, writing for the court)

The Court of Claims disagreed, as it had in two similar previous cases, Greenwald v. United States, and Gargaro v. United States. The Court observed that in North American Oil, the plaintiff was ultimately allowed to keep the money in question, and so it was not unfair for the government to keep the taxes that were paid. In Greenwald, in Gargaro, and now in Lewis' case, the plaintiffs had ultimately lost money. The Court held that it was unjust for the government to keep the taxes that were paid, and North American Oil did not apply.

== Decision of the Supreme Court ==
=== Majority opinion ===
In an 8–1 decision, the Supreme Court reversed, ruling that the claim of right doctrine from North American Oil applied to situations like Mr. Lewis'. In an opinion by Justice Black, the Court stated:

The "claim of right" interpretation of the tax laws has long been used to give finality to that period, and is now deeply rooted in the federal tax system . . . We see no reason why the Court should depart from this well-settled interpretation merely because it results in an advantage or disadvantage to a taxpayer.

— United States v. Lewis, 340 U.S. at 592 (1951) (Justice Black, writing for the majority)

=== Douglas' dissent ===
Justice Douglas wrote in dissent that it would be both simpler and more fair to allow taxpayers in Lewis' situation to ask for a refund. It would still be necessary to pay taxes on income when it was received, but a refund could be processed in subsequent years.

== Subsequent developments ==
The claim of right doctrine did not leave taxpayers like Lewis completely at a loss, since they would be "entitled to a deduction" in the year they were ordered to repay former earnings. In 1954, Congress would make this part of the Internal Revenue Code in 26 U.S. Code § 1341.
