= International Public Sector Accounting Standards =

Set of accounting standards

International Public Sector Accounting Standards (IPSAS) are a set of accounting standards issued by the IPSAS Board for use by public sector entities around the world in the preparation of financial statements. These standards are based on International Financial Reporting Standards (IFRS) issued by the International Accounting Standards Board (IASB).

== Objective ==
IPSAS aims to improve the quality of general purpose financial reporting by public sector entities, leading to better informed assessments of the resource allocation decisions made by governments, thereby increasing transparency and accountability. This objective is to be delivered by developing and maintaining IPSAS and other financial reporting guidance, and by raising awareness and adoption of accrual-based accounting in the public sector.

== Scope ==
IPSAS are accounting standards for application by national governments, regional (e.g., state, provincial, territorial) governments, local (e.g., city, town) governments and related governmental entities (e.g., agencies, boards and commissions). IPSAS standards are widely used by intergovernmental organizations or institutions. IPSAS do not apply to government business enterprises.

== Due process ==
IPSAS are issued by IPSASB (International Public Sector Accounting Standards Board), an independent organ of IFAC (International Federation of Accountants). The IPSASB adopts a due process for the development of IPSAS that provides the opportunity for comment by interested parties including auditors, preparers (including finance ministries), standard setters, and individuals. IPSASB meetings to discuss the development and to approve the issuance of IPSAS or other papers are open to the public. Agenda papers, including the minutes of the meetings of the IPSASB, are published on the IPSASB's website: www.ipsasb.org. Observers on the IPSASB meetings include ADB, EU, IASB, IMF, INTOSAI, OECD, UN, UNDP and the World Bank.

== Convergence with IFRS ==
IPSAS are based on the International Financial Reporting Standards (IFRS), formerly known as the International Accounting Standards (IAS). IFRS are issued by the International Accounting Standards Board (IASB). IPSASB adapts IFRS to a public sector context when appropriate. In undertaking that process, the IPSASB attempts, wherever possible, to maintain the accounting treatment and original text of the IFRS unless there is a significant public sector issue which warrants a departure.

== Language ==
The approved text of IPSAS standards is that published by the IPSASB in the English language. The IPSASB Handbook has been translated from English into a number of languages, including French , Spanish , German, Russian and Chinese. The Arab Society of Certified Accountants (ASCA) of Jordan issued an Arabic version of the IPSASB Handbook. In addition, Brazil is working on translation of IPSAS into Portuguese. See for more information.

== Features ==
There are 42 standards on the accrual basis of accounting and one standard on the cash basis of accounting (source: IPSAS Handbook published March 2011).

- When the accrual basis of accounting underlies the preparation of the financial statements, the financial statements will include:
  - the statement of financial position (IPSAS 1),
  - the statement of financial performance (IPSAS 1),
  - the cash flow statement (IPSAS 2),
  - the statement of changes in net assets/equity (IPSAS 1),
  - the notes to the financial statements, or annex (IPSAS 1).
- When the cash basis of accounting underlies the preparation of the financial statements, the primary financial statement is
  - the statement of cash receipts and payments.

== Funding ==
Multilateral development banks (World Bank, ADB) provide a substantial amount of funding for the work of IPSASB. Other sources of revenue for the development of IPSASs include funding from international, national and regional government entities. In addition, IFAC (International Federation of Accountants) and the CICA (Canadian Institute of Chartered Accountants) support the IPSASB activity.

== Impact of the credit crisis on public sector accounting ==
The credit crisis has raised several public sector accounting issues. Governments have extended credit to banks, guaranteed the liabilities of banks, purchased impaired debt instruments and in some instances have assumed control of banks. The unique nature of the credit crisis and the unprecedented response by governments around the world has reinforced the importance of high-quality standards for financial reporting by governments. The credit crisis has increased the need for accountability in the public sector and for transparency in its financial dealings.

== Adoption by intergovernmental organizations ==
The following intergovernmental organizations have adopted IPSAS or are in the process of adopting IPSAS:

- Commonwealth Secretariat: Adopted IPSAS as the basis for financial reporting from 1 July 2008 i.e. Financial Year 2008–2009. Source: Commonwealth Secretariat Website 2008-09 Audited Financial Statements (Page 5 under Accounting Policies).
- CoE (Council of Europe): Issues IPSAS compliant financial statements since 2007.
- EC (European Communities): Issues IPSAS-similar financial statements since 2005.
- ESA (European Space Agency): Aims to be IPSAS compliant by January 1, 2010.
- EUMETSAT (European Organisation for the Exploitation of Meteorological Satellites): Aims to be IPSAS compliant with the production of the annual accounts 2012, in March 2013.
- INTERPOL (International Criminal Police Organization): From 2007 onwards, financial statements are prepared in accordance with INTERPOL's Financial Regulations and in compliance with IPSAS. If there is a divergence between IPSAS and INTERPOL's Financial Regulations, the INTERPOL Financial Regulations have been applied. Divergences are not deemed to be significant.
- ITER (ITER Organization – IO): Issues IPSAS financial statements since 2008.
- NATO (North Atlantic Treaty Organization): Issues IPSAS financial statements since 2008.
- OECD (Organisation for Economic Co-operation and Development): Issues IPSAS-compliant financial statements since 2000, the first body in the world to do so.
- BIPM (BIPM): Issues IPSAS financial statements since 2010.

=== United Nations System ===
UN (United Nations), Programmes and Funds (such as UNDP, UNFPA, UNICEF and UNHCR), Specialized Agencies (such as FAO, ICAO, ILO, UNIDO, UNESCO, UNOPS and WHO) and Related Organizations (such as IAEA, OPCW, the World Trade Organization, and the World Meteorological Organization) aim to be IPSAS compliant.

- WFP (World Food Programme): WFP is the first United Nations agency to implement IPSAS. In its 2008 financial statements, WFP adopted all standards issued by the IPSAS Board including several standards prior to their effective date.
- PNUD: Adoption in progress (2009/2012)

IPSAS Manager Mark Fielding-Pritchard reports that UN Women adopted in full IPSAS from 1 January 2012. This was followed by a clean audit report from UNBoA as of 31 December 2012.

== Adoption by country ==
Many governments say they are introducing IPSAS because it is considered to be good practice. However, very few governments have actually adopted the standards. In terms of the Cash Basis IPSAS, not a single country in the world has actually adopted the standard. The main problem is the key requirement to produce consolidated financial statements for all controlled entities. Consolidating government business entities with ministries and departments would be very time-consuming, and almost all governments consider that it is not worth the very real costs.

- Afghanistan – Process in place to adopt IPSAS, first cash basis then accrual basis. Legislation passed.
- Abu Dhabi – Prepared 2010 financial statements in accordance with accrual accounting IPSAS for some departments and municipalities.
- Albania – Applies cash basis of accounting. Law requires modified cash basis of accounting (including accounts payable). Plans to adopt cash basis IPSAS with the possibility of applying accrual accounting IPSAS subsequently.
- Algeria – World Bank project for accounting and other reform includes IPSAS.
- Argentina – Process in place to develop public sector accounting standards that are harmonized with accrual accounting IPSAS.
- Armenia – In the process of gradual transition towards accrual basis IPSAS. Draft law on public sector accounting and draft accounting standards, policies, manual and chart of accounts have been designed.
- Australia – Adopted full accrual accounting standards, consistent with IPSAS. The Australian Accounting Standards Board (AASB) has issued 'Australian equivalents to IFRS' (A-IFRS). The AASB has made certain amendments to the IASB pronouncements in making A-IFRS; however, these generally have the effect of eliminating an option under IFRS, introducing additional disclosures or implementing requirements for public sector entities, rather than departing from IFRS for Australian entities. Because of these amendments, the final standards as they apply to public sector entities are very similar to IPSAS.
- Austria – Process in place to adopt accrual accounting IPSAS.
- Azerbaijan – The 2004 Law on Accounting requires the adoption of national public sector accounting standards based on IPSAS by public sector effective 1 January 2009. Applicable to municipalities, budget organizations and off-budget state funds, i.e. the State Oil Fund and the Social Security Fund.
- Bangladesh – The government of Bangladesh has expressed both commitment and willingness to adopt the cash basis IPSAS and has taken an initiative to prepare the financial statements in accordance with the cash basis IPSAS. The first set of IPSAS based statements for the core ministries (excluding specialized organizations) and the specialized organizations are planned to be produced by the fiscal year 2007-2008 and 2009-2010 respectively. The government considers the adoption of the cash basis IPSAS a point of departure towards implementing the accrual basis of accounting in the long run.
- Barbados – Process in place to adopt accrual basis IPSAS.
- Belarus – Applies modified cash basis. No plans to adopt IPSAS.
- Bhutan – The department of public accounts (DPA) has notified that it will develop Royal Government of Bhutan Accounting Standards by referring to the cash basis IPSAS. The government of Bhutan has expressed a commitment to adopting the cash basis IPSAS and studying the feasibility of gradually moving to accrual basis of accounting.
- Bosnia and Herzegovina – Reports on the cash basis of accounting. No plans to adopt IPSAS.
- Botswana – Member of ESAAG (East and Southern African Association of Accountants General). The aims of ESAAG member states include the adoption of the Cash-basis IPSAS.
- Brazil – The Federal Government of Brazil has announced plans to fully implement IPSAS by 2012.
- Bulgaria – Applies modified cash basis. Some initiatives to adopt IPSAS, but no concrete plan.
- Cambodia – Process in place to adopt accrual basis IPSAS.
- Canada – Applies accounting standards that are broadly consistent with IPSAS
- Cayman Islands – Government has adopted accrual basis IPSAS. However, this was associated with major problems and a delay of publishing government financial statements of over five years and very critical reports from the Auditor General.
- Chile – For several years the Chilean Public Sector has used accrual accounting, and “Contraloría General de la República” is leading a process to converge to IPSAS
- China – Project in place to adopt IPSAS. There is no formally announced decision.
- Cyprus – Has adopted the cash basis IPSAS.
- Colombia – The government of Colombia has made a commitment to IPSAS and is working on the convergence of its national accounting standards with international standards.
- Costa Rica – Government of Costa Rica mandated the use of IPSAS on October 11, 2007, by publishing Decree No. 34029-H. The process of adopting and implementing IPSAS has been undertaken by the preparation of the Official Accounting Framework for the financial and non-financial sectors of the public sector in Costa Rica.
- Croatia – Applies modified cash basis. No plans to adopt IPSAS.
- Cyprus – Process in place to adopt cash basis IPSAS.
- East and Southern Africa – The East and Southern African Association of Accountants General member states' aims include adoption of IPSAS. The association's member states are Botswana, Kenya, Lesotho, Malawi, Mauritius, Mozambique, Namibia, Rwanda, South Africa, Swaziland, Tanzania, Uganda, Zambia, and Zimbabwe. Funding support is provided by the Swedish International Development Cooperation Agency. See 'Tanzania' Section for updates about Tanzania.
- East Timor – Has adopted the cash basis IPSAS.
- El Salvador – World Bank project has IPSAS adoption as one objective.
- Estonia – Process in place to adopt accrual basis IPSAS.
- Fiji – Prepared 2009 financial statements in accordance with the cash basis IPSAS, including a consolidated statement of cash receipts and payments.
- France – Government has moved to accrual recently: Government financial statements were issued for the first time in 2006. They are audited by the Cour des Comptes (Public National Audit Office). Accounting standards are based on French GAAP for the private sector, IFRS and IPSAS. Standards are issued by the Conseil de normalisation des comptes publics (Advisory council on public sector accounting standards).
- Gambia – In the process of adopting the cash basis IPSAS, will then move to adopt accrual basis IPSAS.
- Georgia – Central government currently prepares budget execution reports in accordance with the cash basis of accounting. In 2007 the minister of finance decided to adopt IPSAS for central and sub-national governments, starting with the Cash-basis IPSAS, gradually adding disclosures about assets and liabilities in order to subsequently arrive at accrual accounting IPSAS.
- Germany – The City of Hamburg takes IPSAS as well as IFRS and the German Handelsgesetzbuch (HGB) into consideration in preparing its accrual accounting financial statements.
- Ghana – the adoption of Accrual Based IPSAS was announced in 2014 as the framework for preparation, presentation and disclosure of general purpose financial statement. The implementation of the Standards is however scheduled to be completed in the year 2023.
- Guatemala – Process in place to adopt accrual basis IPSAS.
- Honduras – Process in place to adopt accrual basis IPSAS.
- Hungary – European Union twinning project for accounting and other reform does not includes IPSAS at all but rather IAS (IAS 26).
- India – The Government Accounting Standards Advisory Board is in favor of limited adoption of cash basis IPSAS for cash transactions and corresponding accrual IPSASs for those transactions recorded on other than the cash basis. A road map has been prepared for transition from the cash to accrual accounting system and an operational framework for its implementation. The possible transition towards accrual accounting has been planned incremental and in phases spanning from 10–12 years. The central government and the majority of Indian state governments have accepted the idea of accrual accounting. The Committee on Accounting Standards for Local Bodies is reviewing IPSAS with a view to their adoption.
- Indonesia – IPSAS-compliant government accounting standards is in process. Download Indonesia Central Government's Financial Statements 2008
- Israel – On August 5, 2004 Government Resolution Number 2375 was passed as to the adoption and implementation of IPSAS by government ministries and by non-commercial statutory corporations. The Accountant General is currently leading a reform in the administration of State assets and liabilities involving the gradual adoption and implementation of IPSAS. A significant part of the data in the financial statements is presented according to Israeli Government Accounting Standards and IPSAS, but the statement of assets does not represent all the assets held by the State of Israel.
- Italy – Italy is moving towards an accrual accounting system. As required by the Reform 1.15 of the National Recovery and Resilience Plan, starting from 2027 Italy will adopt a single accrual accounting system for the entire public sector, in line with the path outlined European level by Council Directive 2011/85/EU. The Italian accrual accounting standards (ITAS) are IPSAS inspired and take into account the EUROSTAT-EPSAS Expert group guidance. https://accrual.rgs.mef.gov.it
- Jamaica – Commitment to adopt accrual basis IPSAS and change is in process.
- Japan – Cash receipts and payments during several months after fiscal year-end are recorded and reported attributable to the prior fiscal year. The Government of Japan's consolidated financial statements are issued twelve months after the balance sheet date, whereas IPASAS 1.69 requires to issue within six months of the reporting date. Taxes are presented on the statement of changes in net assets, presuming that those are capital contributions from the taxpayers. This is a concept denied by IPSAS 23.62. The Government of Japan's statement of financial performance has no revenue, only expenses.

https://www.mof.go.jp/budget/report/public_finance_fact_sheet/index.htm.

- Jordan – The Jordanian Council of Ministers has announced plans to adopt and fully implement the International Public Sector Accounting Standards.
- Kazakhstan – The Government of Kazakhstan has announced that from January 1, 2013, the Republic of Kazakhstan will prepare and present public sector financial statements that comply in all material respects, with accrual basis International Public Sector Accounting Standards. Current financial reporting practice in the public sector is based on various decrees issued by the government, and the current proposal is to migrate directly to the IPSASs from the current basis. The migration process has been initiated by the Ministry of Finance with input from the National Bank.
- Kenya – Member of ESAAG (East and Southern African Association of Accountants General). The aims of ESAAG member states include the adoption of the Cash-basis IPSAS. However, like the other members of ESAAG, Kenya has not adopted the Cash Basis IPSAS.
- Kyrgyzstan – The Kyrgyz Ministry of Finance is finalizing the transition to IPSAS in line with the Kyrgyz government's approval of an action plan to reform accounting and financial reporting in the public sector
- Kosovo – Having adopted the cash-basis IPSAS in 2004, the Republic of Kosovo was among the first countries in the world to issue financial statements complying with the cash-basis IPSAS. However, government business enterprises are not consolidated. Many ministries show subsidies and transfers to these organizations, but they are not fully consolidated as required by the Cash IPSAS. These financial statements are available in English from: http://www.mef-rks.org/en/download/517-budget-reports-and-financial-statements.
- Kuwait – The Ministry of Finance of the State of Kuwait has a project in place to implement accrual accounting IPSAS.
- Laos – IMF and World Bank are working with the government to adopt IPSAS.
- Latvia – Financial statements for central and local government and government-related entities are accrual IPSAS compliant with one exception: tax revenue. Budget execution reports are cash-based.
- Lebanon – Project in progress to introduce IPSAS.
- Lesotho – Member of ESAAG (East and Southern African Association of Accountants General). The aims of ESAAG member states include the adoption of the Cash-basis IPSAS.
- Liberia – On November 19, 2009 the Liberian Minister of Finance, the Hon Augustine Ngafuan, announced the adoption of the Cash Basis IPSAS for all transactions involving the central Government of Liberia. The Minister also announced the Government's long-term goal of adopting the accrual basis IPSAS. The Cash Basis IPSAS shall be applied to prepare government financial statements to cover the fiscal year July 1, 2009 to June 30, 2010, the government will migrate to the accrual basis IPSASs over a five-year period.
- Lithuania – Approved IPSAS accrual accounting standards and are preparing accrual accounting financial statements for 2010.
- North Macedonia – In the process of adopting the cash basis IPSAS, will then move to adopt accrual basis IPSAS. The Agency for financial support of agriculture and rural development, as well as the National fund within the Ministry of Finance use IPSAS accrual basis for the purposes of reporting to the European Commission on the use of the IPARD (Instrument for pre-accession assistance in rural development) funds.
- Malaysia – The Malaysian Federal Government has adopted the cash basis IPSAS. Its financial statements for the year ended December 31, 2005 were prepared in accordance with the cash basis IPSAS, were audited by the Supreme Audit Institution of Malaysia and received an unqualified audit opinion. However, government business enterprises are not consolidated. The New Economic Model for Malaysia, which was unveiled in 2 parts in 2010, has outlined a number Strategic Reform Initiatives ("SRIs") in support of the Economic Transformation Programme, as well as various policy measures forming the bedrock of these SRIs. The adoption of accrual accounting by the public sector was listed as one of these policy measures. This recommendation has immediately prompted the Performance Management and Delivery Unit ("PEMANDU") to bring on board some of the best and brightest amongst the public sector accountants and academia, as well as technical experts representing related bodies such as the Malaysian Institute of Accountants and the Malaysian Accounting Standards Board to draw up the transition roadmap through a six-week laboratory session. According to the roadmap, accrual accounting will be adopted in the financial reporting by the public sector with effect from 1 January 2015, using bases and policies which are consistent in all material respect with accrual basis IPSAS.
- Malawi – Member of ESAAG (East and Southern African Association of Accountants General). The aims of ESAAG member states include the adoption of the Cash-basis IPSAS.
- Maldives – The Audit Act of the country allows the cash basis IPSAS to be followed albeit this is not specified in the public finance law. Process in place to adopt IPSAS. The Ministry of Finance and Treasury has been planning to introduce the IPSAS formats for statements, explanatory notes, and disclosures in 2009 as part of a public sector accounting project.
- Mauritania – Decision made to adopt IPSAS, implementation initiated.
- Mauritius – Member of ESAAG (East and Southern African Association of Accountants General). The aims of ESAAG member states include the adoption of the Cash-basis IPSAS.
- Moldova – Treasury reports on the cash basis of accounting. Considering to adopt Cash-basis IPSAS. Budget institutions apply modified accrual basis of accounting
- Mongolia – Paragraph 26.3 of the Management and Financing Law for Budget Entities specifies that state entities prepare financial statements on the accrual basis of accounting. The Ministry of Finance, Mongolia and the Mongolian Institute of Certified Public Accountants provide public sector entities with the current IPSASB handbook of pronouncements for this purpose.
- Montenegro – Reports on the cash basis of accounting. No plans to adopt IPSAS
- Morocco – Institution building includes IPSAS.
- Mozambique – Member of ESAAG (East and Southern African Association of Accountants General). The aims of ESAAG member states include the adoption of the Cash-basis IPSAS.
- Namibia – Member of ESAAG (East and Southern African Association of Accountants General). The aims of ESAAG member states include the adoption of the Cash-basis IPSAS.
- Nepal – There is general consensus among policy makers, accounting professionals, and international organizations on the need for Nepal to adopt the cash basis IPSAS. Nepal has been developing Nepal public sector accounting standards by referring to the cash basis IPSAS in a close collaboration between the professional accountants and government officials. Attempts are being made to change the accounting regulations in order to incorporate the mandatory use of IPSAS. Nepal has successfully completed piloting of two ministries for fiscal year 2011/12 & 2012/13 of Ministry of Physical Infrastructure and Transport & Ministry of Women, Children and Social Welfare, followed by live implementation for fiscal year 2013/14 of these two ministries. Certificate of conformance was also provided to these two ministries by ICFGM for respective years. Implementation was further extended for 31 economic entities (ministries & constitutional bodies) for fiscal year 2014/15 & 2015/16 which has also been completed by the end of 2016. Nepal has completely implemented NPSAS to all 43 economic entities (As-a-whole-of-government) in 2018. OAG format (federal, province and local government) has been approved by office of auditor general in January 2019. Implementation to provincial government is being exercised in 2019.
- Netherlands – Government has experimented adoption of accrual basis IPSAS. The minister of Finance submitted an evaluation of this pilot to parliament in October 2008, arguing that accrual accounting is not more useful for ministries than the current commitments-cash accounting system. The Minister decided to improve the current commitments-cash accounting system and the non-financial information in the budget and the annual report. Parliament requested an analysis of experiences in accrual accounting in other countries. Accrual accounting has already been adopted by agencies, quangos and other 'business-like' organizations of government.
- New Zealand – At present New Zealand public sector entities apply NZ IFRS, which include 'public benefit entity (PBE)' amendments. These PBE amendments mean that NZ IFRS, as they apply to public sector entities, are similar to IPSAS. However, New Zealand is currently considering proposals to have two sets of accounting standards: one set to be applied by entities with a for-profit objective; and another set to be applied by entities with a public benefit objective. It is proposed that this latter set of standards be based on IPSAS. Details of these proposals are available at XRB
- Nicaragua – Adopted cash basis IPSAS.
- Nigeria – In the process of adopting the cash basis IPSAS, will then move to adopt accrual basis IPSAS. This is to conform to international accounting standards.
- Norway – Central government is piloting the change to full accrual accounting. In the pilot entities Norway applies the accrual basis IPSAS where there is no applicable Norwegian private sector accounting standard.
- Pakistan – Adopting Cash Basis IPSAS was one of the major achievements of World Bank backed Project to Improve Financial Reporting and Auditing (PIFRA). Now the Federal Government, all Provincial Governments and District Governments are presenting their annual financial statements on Cash Basis IPSAS. The compliance with the Cash Basis IPSAS is seen as a transition path towards presenting the full accrual information. World Bank project supports this change.
- Palestinian Authority – The 2008 financial statements are the first financial statements similar to the cash-basis IPSAS to be issued by the Palestinian Authority. Deviations from the standard include consolidation and budget information. There is an ambition to apply accrual accounting IPSAS for the 2012 financial statements.
- Peru – In the process of adopting IPSAS. IPSAS 1 to 17 were implemented on January 1, 2004 and IPSAS Standards 18 to 21 were implemented on March 14, 2006.
- Philippines – Has adopted accrual accounting IPSAS.
- Romania – Central government has adopted the accrual basis of accounting, including some of the IPSASs, notably IPSAS 1 Presentation of Financial Statements, IPSAS 2 Cash Flow Statements, IPSAS 12 Inventories, IPSAS 17 Property, Plant and Equipment and IPSAS 19 Provisions, Contingent Liabilities and Contingent Assets. Plans include improvement of compliance with these standards and the adoption of additional IPSASs, including IPSAS 6 Consolidated and separate financial statements.
- Russia – Has adopted the accrual accounting IPSAS and has made significant progress towards implementation.
- Rwanda – The financial statements and accounting policies adhere, to the extent possible, to the Cash-basis IPSAS. Deviations include recognition of accounts payable (invoices for goods and services which are outstanding on the date of the closure of the fiscal year are recognized as liabilities), loans receivable and advances are recognized as assets, interest payable on public debt is accrued, and consolidation.
- Saudi Arabia – The Ministry of Finance of the Kingdom of Saudi Arabia and the Saudi Audit Bureau commissioned a study starting 2008 to evaluate the Saudi government's current financial reporting and to analyze the improvements IPSAS might bring.
- Swaziland – Member of ESAAG (East and Southern African Association of Accountants General). The aims of ESAAG member states include the adoption of the Cash-basis IPSAS.
- Serbia – Applies cash accounting. Law includes requirements to comply with Cash-basis IPSAS.
- Singapore – Adopted full accrual accounting standards, consistent with IPSAS.
- Slovak Republic – Has adopted accrual basis IPSAS.
- Slovenia – Reports on the cash basis of accounting. No plans to adopt IPSAS. In 2010 a law went into effect requiring a state balance sheet to be included in the financial statements.
- Solomon Islands – Prepared 2009 financial statements in accordance with the cash basis IPSAS, including a consolidated statement of cash receipts and payments.
- South Africa – The Office of the Accountant General (OAG) issues a preparation guide on financial statements to be adopted by government departments per financial year. This guide prescribes the modified cash basis of accounting to be used by all departments. Public entities and trading entities use Generally Recognized Accounting Practice (GRAP), developed by the South African Accounting Standards Board based on IPSAS. Public/ widely held companies use IFRS.
- Spain – The Spanish Ministry of Economy and Finance is implementing accrual basis IPSAS for public sector financial reporting. The Ministry plans to have implemented accrual basis IPSAS by 2011 at the latest. Spanish translation of IPSAS Handbook is available.
- Sri Lanka – The state annual accounts are prepared in accordance with the cash basis IPSAS since 2002. The incorporation of the additional accrual disclosures in the financial statements has been seen as a first step towards the accrual-basis of accounting. The government has expressed its commitment towards adopting the accrual-basis IPSASs for accounting and budgeting. The Government of Sri Lanka has requested that the Institute of Chartered Accountants of Sri Lanka prepare suitable accrual basis accounting standards for use by public sector entities. The ICASL's Public Sector Accounting Standards Committee has begun the process of developing Sri Lankan versions of the IPSASs, as at July 2009, five standards had been completed and forwarded to the Government.
- Switzerland – Federal government is adopting IPSAS, effective from 2007. The government of the State/Canton of Geneva is similarly adopting IPSAS from 2008 and the State/Canton of Zurich from 2009. The governments of the States/Cantons of Lucerne and Berne have initiated projects adopting IPSAS, with effective dates 2012 and 2013, respectively. All States/Cantons should adopt at least a national standard called HAM2, but are allowed to go beyond and adopt IPSAS. HAM2 is based on the accrual basis accounting model HAM (1981), but converges with IPSAS in respect of presentation, recognition and disclosure. However, HAM2 has lesser requirements mainly in respect of measurement.
- Tajikistan – The Public Financial Management Modernisation Programme prepared an implementation and training strategy for Tajikistan national public sector accounting standards based on IPSAS as part of an overall public sector reform strategy by the Ministry of Finance.
- Tanzania – The Central Government, Tanzania, under the Accountant General (ACGEN) migrated to accrual based IPSAS for the year ended 30 June 2013. Local Government Authorities and other Government Entities are complying with accrual based IPSAS/IFRS respectively. For the year ended 30 June 2014, the ACGEN Office prepared for Tanzania Mainland, the first set of consolidated financial statements for the Whole-Of-Government. The Government adopted the transition provision of IPSAS 6, hence the elimination of inter-entity transactions and balances will be done for the year ending 30 June 2015. Additionally, the transitional provisions of IPSAS 17 on PPE and IPSAS 23 on Taxes have been adopted, hence the five years transitional period to 2017.
- Turkey – Turkish central government started moving to modified accrual based accounting in 2003. The Public Financial Management and Control Law of 2006 require the government to adopt international accounting standards for the public sector. Based on this law, the government issued a public accounting regulation for central government entities in 2006 and established a Public Accounting Standards Board. In 2006 this Board decided to adopt IPSAS 1 through IPSAS 21 in a 6-year period (deadline is 2012). By 2011 17 standards have been adopted.
- Turkmenistan – As part of its public administration reform project, the Ministry of Finance prepares the adoption of accrual accounting IPSAS.
- Uganda – Arrangements are underway to commence transition from modified cash basis of accounting to adoption of full accrual IPSAS. A phased implementation approach is planned. This will entail a phased implementation approach initially focusing on updating the legal and regulatory frame work for budgeting, financial management and reporting, review of the chart of accounts and development of comprehensive accounting policies and reporting guidelines.
- Ukraine – Presidential decree requires government to adopt accrual accounting, but no accrual accounting standards have been adopted yet.
- United Arab Emirates – Process in place to adopt accrual basis IPSAS.
- United Kingdom – UK public sector applies accounting guidance that is broadly consistent with IPSAS. The accounts of the central government departments and entities in the central government and health sectors have been produced using International Financial Reporting Standards as adopted by the EU from 2009/10 onwards. IPSAS form the second level of standards in the hierarchy used in developing the IFRS-based accounting guidance, and are relied on where they cover issues not covered by IFRS or IAS, or where they provide additional guidance on interpretations or adaptations for the public sector context. Local government bodies in the UK have adopted this framework from 2010/11 onwards.
- United States – Applies accounting standards that are broadly consistent with IPSAS.
- Uruguay – The government has mandated IPSAS for the national accounting entity. This is established in clause 21 of Decree 81, dated December 17, 2002, that gives responsibility to the National Audit Office of the Republic, to record and publish the financial statements. Decree 327/997 gives responsibility to the General Accounting Office of the Nation to draw up the General Framework for Public Accounting, including the master plan of accounts, and all related standards and to draft the financial statements for the Nation's Treasury and Public Accounts. The General Accounting Office of the Nation has not yet complied with the decree, but it is making a great effort to implement the mandate and to install a reliable accounting system. It is also preparing the government staff to become proficient in the knowledge and practical use of IPSAS.
- Uzbekistan – The Ministry of Finance of the Republic of Uzbekistan has adopted a Public Financial Management Reform Strategy 2007-2018, which has been published on www.adb. org. The Strategy states, inter alia: "Accordingly, it is planned to: promulgate new Uzbekistan public sector accounting standards in line with accrual basis IPSAS; comply with GFSM 2001; and undertake budget accounting on a cash basis reflecting the GFSM 2001 classification structure."
- Vanuatu – Process in place to adopt accrual basis IPSAS.
- Vietnam – Process in place to adopt IPSAS with IMF and World Bank support. Translation of IPSAS in process.
- Yemen – Process in place to adopt cash basis IPSAS.
- Zambia – Process in place to adopt cash basis IPSAS. Member of ESAAG (East and Southern African Association of Accountants General). The aims of ESAAG member states include the adoption of the Cash-basis IPSAS.
- Zimbabwe – Member of ESAAG (East and Southern African Association of Accountants General). The aims of ESAAG member states include the adoption of the Cash-basis IPSAS.

However, the number of governments that have actually adopted the full accrual basis for the financial statements of their central government ministries is very limited. In December 2007, Mike Hathorn (then chair of the IPSAS Board) said that only six governments across the world had actually issued financial statements on the full accrual basis (at the FEE Public Sector meeting, Brussels). In September 2009, the IMF said that the following countries had adopted the full accrual basis of accounting:

- Australia
- Canada
- Colombia
- France
- New Zealand
- UK
- US

See – https://web.archive.org/web/20121005232340/http://www.eastafritac.org/images/uploads/documents_storage/Transition_to_Accrual_Accounting.pdf

== See also ==
- International Financial Reporting Standards
- Accrual accounting in the public sector
