= Interest expense =

Costs associated with borrowing money

Interest expense relates to the cost of borrowing money. It is the price that a lender charges a borrower for the use of the lender's money. On the income statement, interest expense can represent the cost of borrowing money from banks, bond investors, and other sources. Interest expense is different from operating expense and capital expense, for it relates to the capital structure of a company, and it is usually tax-deductible.

On the income statement, interest income and interest expense are reported separately, or sometimes together under either "interest income - net" (if there is a surplus in interest income) or "interest expense - net" (if there is a surplus in interest expense).

== Calculation ==
The following shows the calculation of interest rate.

1. Take the principal outstanding amount on loan during the period.
2. Identify the annualized interest rate.
3. Identify the time period, which the interest expense would be calculated.
4. Use the following formula to calculate the interest expense.

Principal x Interest Rate x Time period = Interest expense

Once interest expense is calculated, it is usually recorded as accrued liabilities by the borrower. The entry would be debited to interest expense and credit to accrued liability called interest payable. The credit shifts to the accounts payable account when the lender sends an invoice for the expense. Finally, you debit interest payable and credit cash when the interest expense is paid.

== See also ==
- Freight expense
