= VSOE =

VSOE may refer to:

- Venice Simplon-Orient-Express, a passenger train service
- Vendor-specific objective evidence, in accounting practices
