= Public net worth =

Public Net Worth may refer to:

- Public sector net worth — A financial measure of a government's wealth, considering the value of its entire balance sheet.
- Public Net Worth (book) — A 2024 book (ISBN 978-3-031-44343-5) on the proper management of a government's wealth.
