= Public sector balance sheet =

A public sector balance sheet, like a balance sheet in the corporate world, reports comprehensively on what a government owns and owes, as well as its own capital. As such, it is a critical element of a system of public financial management. A balance sheet, or statement of financial position, recognises and discloses the assets, liabilities, and net worth at a given point in time, for a government entity, a government or the whole public sector. An important metric for the fiscal position of the whole public sector is public sector net worth.

For a government at any level, local, regional or national, the balance sheet offers greater fiscal transparency, being more comprehensive than the conventional metrics of debt and deficits.

The quality of the financial statements depends on the quality of data used and what basis of accounting is used to compose the balance sheet and the other financial statements.

== History ==
Willem Buiter and the International Monetary Fund (IMF) argued in 1983 for the use of public sector balance sheets to improve public financial management.

Following a financial crisis, the New Zealand government passed its Public Finance Act (PFA) in 1989, introducing accrual budgeting, appropriations and accounting, publishing the world's first public sector balance sheet based on audited accounting records rather than statistical estimates.

The IMF shifted its Government Finance Statistics Manual from a cash to an accrual basis in 2001. It is more recently emphasising the importance of government balance sheets on a global basis, albeit using statistical rather than accounting data.

In 2021, the International Federation of Accountants and the Chartered Institute of Public Finance and Accountancy predicted that by 2025, almost half the world's governments would adopt accrual-based accounting. Far fewer, however, would be using accrual information at the heart of their financial management and budget systems. For example, the UK's Whole of Government Accounts, which reports its public sector real estate assets, does not have a mandate to assign a fair market value to the assets, and its financial management framework pays very little attention to net worth creation.

== Process ==
The use of proper public sector balance sheets rests upon the use of accrual accounting throughout the public financial management system, making it integral to financial and budgetary decision-making.

- Level 1 - governments focus their financial decision-making and reporting almost entirely on cash flows and levels of debt, though information on debt is usually constrained to the nominal value of the debt. This results in assets, especially non-financial assets, being poorly managed, along with insurance obligations.
- Level 2 - budgeting and appropriations focus on cash flows, while ex post reporting covers the full spectrum of assets and liabilities. Because decision-making within the budgeting system does not utilize accrual information, it is sub-optimal. While transparency is improved with accrual reporting, the failure to use the information for management purposes reduces both its value and the incentives to produce it in a timely manner.
- Level 3 - financial decision-making utilizes a more comprehensive set of information and should result in greater attention being placed on asset utilization and management, and on the incurrence and management of non-debt liabilities. However, because the appropriations, which are legally binding, are cash measures, there remain strong incentives to focus on cash flows in management decision-making and control.
- Level 4 - the financial system is fully based on a comprehensive set of information covering all assets and liabilities, revenues, and expenses. This enables better informed decision-making that reflects all resources and flows, including cash flows. The measures, signals and incentives generated by the system are consistent in encouraging optimal use of all resources.
