= Claim of Right (disambiguation) =

Claim of Right can refer to:

- Claim of Right Act 1689, an Act of the Parliament of Scotland, confirming the succession to the throne of William II and Mary II following the Glorious Revolution in England
- Claim of Right 1989, a document crafted by the Scottish Constitutional Convention, signed by most serving elected Scottish politicians and civic bodies, acknowledging the sovereign right of the Scottish people to determine the form of government best suited to their needs
- Claim of right doctrine, in United States taxation case law
- Colour of right, sometimes called a claim of right, a common law principle of legal entitlement to an otherwise criminal or tortuous act.
