= Cash method of accounting =

Method based on cash receipt and payment

The cash method of accounting, also known as cash-basis accounting, cash receipts and disbursements method of accounting or cash accounting (the EU VAT directive vocabulary Article 226) records revenue when cash is received, and expenses when they are paid in cash. As a basis of accounting, this is in contrast to the alternative accrual method which records income items when they are earned and records deductions when expenses are incurred regardless of the flow of cash. Cash accounting is usually used for smaller and simpler businesses.

== Cash method of accounting in the United States (GAAP) ==
=== Use in contract accounting ===
The cash method of accounting has historically been one of the four methods of recognizing revenues and profits on contracts, the other ones being the accrual method, the completed-contract method and the percentage-of-completion methods. Since the Tax Reform Act of 1986, the cash method can no longer be used for C corporations, partnerships in which one or more partners are C Corporations, tax shelters, and certain types of trusts.

Because of the 1986 reform, in general, construction businesses do not use the cash method of accounting. Some construction businesses use the cash method, and there are many other companies that use a modified form of the cash method, which is acceptable under federal income tax regulations. Under the modified cash method of accounting, most income and expenses are determined under cash receipts and disbursements, but purchases of equipment and items whose benefit will cover more than one year is to be capitalized, whereas such items as depreciation and amortization are charged to cost.

=== Use in other types of businesses ===
The cash method of accounting is also used by other types of businesses, such as farming businesses, qualified personal business corporations and entities with average gross receipts of $5,000,000 or less for the last three fiscal years.

=== Advantages for tax planning and IRS stand ===
There are certain advantages in tax planning when the cash method of accounting is used: for instance, payment of business expenses may be accelerated before year end, in order to maximize tax deductions, whereas billings for services may be postponed to after year end, so that payments won't be received until the new year, thus postponing tax payments on such income. Because of these advantages and the manipulations that can occur with it in order to minimize taxable income, the IRS has discouraged (although not prohibited entirely) the cash basis of accounting for tax purposes. For instance, companies that use the cash basis of accounting may not report any inventory in their financial statements, in fact reporting of any inventory at year end can lead to manipulation of taxable income to an enormous extent.

== See also ==
- Percentage-of-completion method
