= All-events test =

The all-events test, under U.S. federal income tax law, is the requirement that all the events fixing an accrual-method taxpayer's right to receive income or incur expense must occur before the taxpayer can report an item of income or expense.

== Application ==
Under an accrual method of accounting, income is includible in gross income in the taxable year in which the all-events test is met. The all events test is two-pronged concerning the recognition of income, three-pronged when dealing with deductions. It is met when (1) the right to income is fixed (recognition of income) or all events have occurred which establish the fact of liability (deduction), and (2) the amount thereof can be determined with reasonable accuracy. The third prong which is applicable when dealing with an accrual method taxpayer's right to a deduction is (3) economic performance has occurred with respect to the liability. Exceptions apply to certain recurring items.

Certain other exceptions apply to the all-events test: 1. Taxpayers are put on cash method of accounting in those instances where payment precedes performance or due date of an obligation. This is called the earlier of test. This violates traditional accrual method recognition of income and is an exception to the all-events test because the right to income is not yet fixed. The taxpayer has not yet performed services allowing for the collection of income but through Revenue Ruling the IRS has determined that recognition of income is proper because cash is in hand. 2. Doubt as to Collectibility. This is not a true exception to the all-events test but a clarification. If at the time of sale there was no doubt as to the collectibility of income, doubt that arises subsequent to the time when all events have occurred that fix the right to receipt do not change the fact that all events indeed did occur.

== See also ==
- Claim of right doctrine
- Tax accounting
