= Governmental accounting =

Recording and managing all government transactions

Government accounting refers to the process of recording and the management of all financial transactions incurred by the government which includes its income and expenditures.

Government and public accounting, often referred to as governmental accounting or public sector accounting, is a specialized branch of accounting dedicated to managing the financial affairs of government entities and publicly funded organizations. Its central aim is not profit, as in business, but transparency, accountability, and stewardship of public resources—ensuring taxpayers’ money is used effectively and lawfully.

IPSAS – International Public Sector Accounting Standards Developed by the IPSAS Board under IFAC, the IPSAS framework encourages the use of accrual accounting and promotes global consistency in government financial reporting. It includes mandatory budget-to-actual comparisons to enforce legal and fiscal transparency.

== Public vs. private accounting ==
There is an important difference between private sector accounting and governmental accounting. The main reasons for this difference is the environment of the accounting system. In the government environment, public sector entities have different goals, as opposed to the private sector entities' one main goal of gaining profit. Also, in government accounting, the entity has the responsibility of fiscal accountability which is demonstration of compliance in the use of resources in a budgetary context. In the private sector, the budget is a tool in financial planning and it isn't mandatory to comply with it.

=== Characteristics and objectives ===
Governments often deal with multiple streams of revenue—taxes, grants, fees—each meant for specific purposes. Fund accounting creates separate “buckets” for these resources, ensuring funds aren’t diverted to unintended uses. There are three main frameworks:

- Cash basis records transactions when money is received or paid.
- Accrual basis records revenue when it's earned and expenses when they are incurred.
- Modified accrual recognizes revenues when measurable and available, and expenditures upon liability.

Public budgets are legally binding. Government accountants help ensure expenditures never exceed legislative appropriations, enforcing discipline and compliance. Governments produce detailed reports, like the Comprehensive Annual Financial Report in the U.S. federal government, that include balance sheets, operating statements, cash-flow summaries, budget comparisons, and narrative analysis. These are shared with the public to promote fiscal transparency. External watchdogs, such as the Government Accountability Office in the U.S., the Comptroller and Auditor General of India, or the National Audit Office in the UK, conduct financial, compliance, and performance audits to hold governments to account.

The governmental accounting system sometimes uses the historic system of fund accounting. A set of separate, self-balancing accounts are responsible for managing resources that are assigned to specific purposes based on regulations and limitations.

The governmental accounting system has a different focus for measuring accounting than private sector accounting. Rather than measuring the flow of economic resources, governmental accounting measures the flow of financial resources. Instead of recognizing revenue when they are earned and expenses when they are incurred, revenue is recognized when there is money available to liquidate liabilities within the current accounting period, and expenses are recognized when there is a drain on current resources.

Governmental financial statements must be accompanied by required supplementary information (RSI). The RSI is a comparison of the actual expenses compared to the original budget created at the beginning of the fiscal year for the Government's General Fund and all major Special Revenue Funds.

== Objectives ==
The unique objectives of government accounting do not preclude the use of the double entry accounting system. There can, however, be other significant differences with private sector accounting practices, especially those that are intended to arrive at a net income result. The objectives for which government entities apply accountancy that can be organized in two main categories: - The accounting of activities for accountability purposes. In other words, the representatives of the public, and officials appointed by them, must be accountable to the public for powers and tasks delegated. The public, who have no other choice but to delegate, are in a position that differs significantly from that of shareholders and therefore need financial information, to be supplied by accounting systems, that is applicable and relevant to them and their purposes. - Decision-making purposes. The relevant role-players, especially officials and representatives, need financial information that is accounted, organized and presented for the objectives of their decision-making. These objectives bear, in many instances, no relation to net income results but are rather about service delivery and efficiency. The taxpayer, a very significant group, simply wants to pay as little as possible taxes for the essential services for which money is being coerced by law.

== See also ==
- Classification of the Functions of Government
- Government effectiveness index
- Political accountability
