= Public sector net worth =

The change in public sector net worth in any given forecast year is largely driven by the operating balance and property, plant and equipment revaluations.

Research suggests that the main fiscal factor driving bond yields hence appears to be government net worth.

Focusing on net worth as the most comprehensive measure of fiscal position incentivizes the public sector to invest the proceeds of borrowing in productive investments rather than use debt to finance consumption spending. Net worth also provides a tool for assessing whether government policy is fair to future generations from a financial point of view; negative, or declining, net worth indicates that past or present consumption will ultimately need to be funded by future taxation.

== Overview ==
Public (sector) net worth is a financial measure of a government's wealth, considering the value of its entire balance sheet. Similar to the private sector's balance sheet measurement, net worth is defined as total assets minus total liabilities.

While net worth is central to financial management in the private sector, based on audited accrual numbers, most governments today overlook their balance sheets. Instead, they measure financial health using simple cash measures, such as the relationship between income and expenditure and the amount of outstanding government debt, often expressed as a percentage of GDP.

This discrepancy in accounting practices means that government financial health is less understood compared to private entities. Only very few countries, like New Zealand, prioritize the balance sheet in government financial decision-making. As a result, governments often lack crucial information that could enhance the management of public services and public finances' safety.

Proponents of Public Net Worth as a key fiscal target argue that governments would benefit from complementing their current fiscal rules with a primary rule based on net worth, which more comprehensively reflects their financial position. They claim that adopting accounting-driven, net worth-based fiscal rules creates opportunities to improve long-term public finances without cutting public services or increasing taxes.

Accrual accounting in the public sector is gaining traction among national and local governments. Industry reports indicate that a third of the world's governments have adopted accrual-based accounting. However, the implementation depth varies, with many governments planning to report on an accrual basis but continuing to budget and appropriate on a cash basis, judging their position based on debt.

An undue focus on cash flows and debt results in poor management of assets, especially non-financial assets, and non-debt liabilities such as public service pensions and insurance obligations. Public Net Worth is increasingly seen as a key fiscal measure to complement other fiscal ratios, especially after the International Monetary Fund (IMF) embraced the idea of the public sector balance sheet in 2018.

Focusing on net worth as the most comprehensive measure of fiscal position incentivizes the public sector to invest borrowing proceeds in productive investments rather than using debt to finance consumption spending. Net worth also provides a tool for assessing whether government policy is fair to future generations from a financial perspective; negative or declining net worth indicates that past or present consumption will ultimately need to be funded by future taxation.

Research suggests that government net worth is a main fiscal factor driving bond yields. IMF research indicates that governments with stronger net worth recover faster from recessions and have lower borrowing costs.

== Implementation ==
Whole-of-government balance sheets across OECD countries show substantial divergence in public sector net worth, driven by institutional coverage and accounting treatments. While comprehensive public sector balance sheets provide a perspective on fiscal sustainability compared to gross debt, cross-country comparability is hindered by differing treatments of physical assets, natural resources, and future pension liabilities.

Static public sector net worth varies dramatically among OECD member states, reflecting distinct resource endowments and historic debt accumulations. In a comparative sample of general government balance sheets excluding land and pensions, static net worth ranges from −111 percent of GDP in Greece to +348 percent in Norway, averaging a positive 31 to 34 percent of GDP.

=== United Kingdom ===
In the United Kingdom, progress has been made in altering the discussion on the UK fiscal framework. The Office for Budget Responsibility supported using Public Net Worth as a key fiscal target in its 2019 report, which concluded:

"...the net worth objective would allow the government to take advantage of historically low interest rates to borrow in order to invest in meeting the long-term challenges of restarting productivity growth, tackling climate change, and modernizing our public service infrastructure. Yet it would also hold them accountable for doing so in a way that increases net public value for this and future generations. Where some past fiscal frameworks entirely excluded the results of investment, this approach explicitly recognizes the value of the assets created, acquired, or sold using the Office for National Statistics’ new statistical data on the public sector balance sheet. It thereby encourages government to invest where there is a compelling economic case and the value of the assets generated exceeds the cost of financing. It would also eliminate the fiscal illusions associated with concessional loans or asset fire sales under the current borrowing and debt rules. Likewise, it would force the government to confront its significant and growing non-debt liabilities, including unfunded public sector pensions."

This follows over a decade of work within the UK government to develop the Whole of Government Accounts for better and more timely measures of both sides of the public sector balance sheet. However, this effort faced serious delays and failed to record more than a trillion pounds worth of real estate and unfunded pension liabilities due to the reluctance to introduce accrual-based accounting and a government financial management framework driven by that accounting method.

Andy Haldane, the former Chief Economist at the Bank of England, said in the Financial Times:

"Just as a company or household would look at their net worth when making investment choices, so too should government. Countries with high net assets have been found to have lower borrowing costs. Bond market vigilantes target poor investors, not borrowers. That’s why real government borrowing costs have trended downwards over the centuries, despite government debt ratios trending upwards. Financial markets know it is the value of the house, not the mortgage, that matters. Countries with higher net worth also tend to exhibit greater macroeconomic resilience. This then reduces the burden on the state when adverse shocks strike. Our current debt-based fiscal rules, by constraining public investment, have contributed to a reduction in macroeconomic resilience and a bulging of the safety net following shocks."

Rachel Reeves, the UK Labour Party’s shadow Chancellor of the Exchequer, has pledged to improve public sector net worth and to take greater account of public sector assets in fiscal policy.

Martin Wolf commented on the Labour Party's plans in the Financial Times:

"This [Public Net Worth] should reduce the tendency to slash investment whenever fiscal difficulties emerge. However, she persists with the foolish rule that debt is to fall as a share of GDP, but in the fifth year of the forecast."

Simon Nixon, a former economic columnist in The Times, added:

"This is hugely welcome. A lack of attention to the public balance sheet helps explain why Britain consistently underinvests in infrastructure. Projects whose benefits lie beyond the five-year budget forecast struggle to get funded. Meanwhile, governments have sold off public assets and used the proceeds to fund tax cuts, creating the illusion of national wealth while in fact leaving the state poorer. The result is that Britain has the second lowest public net worth of any major economy after Italy, according to the International Monetary Fund: a staggering minus 96 per cent of GDP. Rather than accumulating capital for future generations, British governments have consumed it."

The Institute for Fiscal Studies concluded in a report:

"There is, nonetheless, a strong case for considering public sector net worth as part of a broader suite of fiscal metrics – particularly when assessing asset sales and purchases, and other balance sheet policies. The government’s Charter for Budget Responsibility already includes a commitment to do this. Labour’s proposal to ‘take greater account’ of public sector net worth appears sensible. But public sector net worth ought not, in our judgement, to be at the centre of the UK fiscal framework."

Some estimates suggest that better management of assets and liabilities could allow the UK government to increase revenues by over 4% of GDP, close to what the Office of Budget Responsibility estimates is needed to sustain existing levels of public services as the population ages.
