= Basis of accounting =

Time when financial transactions are reported

In accounting, a basis of accounting is a method used to define, recognise, and report financial transactions. The two primary bases of accounting are the cash basis of accounting, or cash accounting, method and the accrual accounting method. A third method, the modified cash basis, combines elements of both accrual and cash accounting.

- The cash basis method records income and expenses when cash is actually paid to or by a party.
- The accrual method records income items when they are earned and records deductions when expenses are incurred.
- The modified cash basis records income when it is earned but deductions when expenses are paid out.

Both methods have advantages and disadvantages, and can be used in a wide range of situations. In many cases, regulatory bodies require individuals, businesses or corporations to use one method or the other.

== Comparison ==
Comparison of accounting bases
Scenario	Overview	Cash accounting	Accrual accounting
The company has received advance payment for obligations they have yet to perform	Paid but unearned revenue	Cash Received is recognised as income	Cash paid to company is recognised as deferred income, a form of liability
The company has made advance payment for obligations the other party has yet to perform	Paid but unearned expenses	Cash paid is recognised as expenses	Cash paid by company is recognised as deferred expenses, a form of asset
The company has already performed obligations but have yet to be paid	Earned but unpaid revenue	No revenue is recognised until cash is paid	Cash paid is recognised as accrued income, a form of asset
The company has not yet paid for obligations already performed	Earned but unpaid expenses	No expense is recognised until cash is paid	Cash paid is recognised as accrued expenses, a form of liability

== Accrual basis ==
The accrual method records income items when they are earned and records deductions when expenses are incurred. For a business invoicing for an item sold or work done, the corresponding amount will appear in the books even though no payment has yet been received. Similarly, debts owed by the business are recorded as they are incurred, even if they are paid later.

The accrual basis is a common method of accounting used globally for both financial reporting and taxation. Under accrual accounting, revenue is recognized when it is earned, and expenses are recognized when they are incurred, regardless of when cash is exchanged.

In some jurisdictions, such as the United States, the accrual basis has been an option for tax purposes since 1916. An "accrual basis taxpayer" determines when income is earned based on specific tests, such as the "all-events test" and the "earlier-of test". However, the details of these tests and the timing of income recognition may vary depending on local tax laws and regulations.

For financial accounting purposes, accrual accounting generally follows the principle that revenue cannot be recognized until it is earned, even if payment has been received in advance. The specifics of accrual accounting can vary across jurisdictions, though the overarching principle of recognizing revenue and expenses when they are earned and incurred remains consistent.

== Modified cash basis ==
The modified cash basis of accounting, combines elements of both accrual and cash basis accounting.

Some forms of the modified cash basis record income when it is earned but deductions when expenses are paid out. In other words, the recording of income is on an accrual basis, while the recording of expenses is on the cash basis. The modified method does not conform to the GAAP.

== See also ==
- Accrual
- Accrual accounting in the public sector
- Adjusting entries
- Claim of right doctrine
- Deferral
- Matching principle
- Revenue recognition
- Tax accounting
