= North American Oil Consolidated v. Burnet =

- Supreme Court of the United States

Argued April 20–21, 1932 Decided May 23, 1932
- Full case name: North American Oil Consolidated v. David Burnet, Commissioner of Internal Revenue
- Citations: 286 U.S. 417 (more) 52 S. Ct. 613; 76 L. Ed. 1197; 1932 U.S. LEXIS 856

Case history
- Prior: 12 B.T.A. 68 (1928); reversed, 50 F.2d 752 (9th Cir. 1931); cert. granted, 284 U.S. 614 (1932).

Holding
- The 1916 profits were taxable income to North American Oil in 1917 when the District Court determined that the company had a claim of right to the profits, even though litigation was ongoing at that time.

Court membership
- Chief Justice Charles E. Hughes Associate Justices Willis Van Devanter · James C. McReynolds; Louis Brandeis · George Sutherland; Pierce Butler · Harlan F. Stone; Owen Roberts · Benjamin N. Cardozo

Case opinion
- Majority: Brandeis, joined by unanimous

North American Oil Consolidated v. Burnet, 286 U.S. 417 (1932), was a landmark decision by the United States Supreme Court that established the claim of right doctrine.

== Background ==
=== Facts ===
This case involved the North American Oil Consolidated (hereinafter North American Oil) company which operated several properties in 1916. One of the properties was a section of oil land, and the United States held the legal title to the property. The income earned from the property in 1916 was recorded in North American Oil's books as income.

In 1915, the United States government filed a suit to remove North American Oil from the property, and on February 2, 1916, the court appointed a receiver to operate the property and hold the income derived from the property while litigation ensued.

In 1917, North American Oil was paid the 1916 profits which were acquired during the receivership by order of the District Court. The government appealed, but it was not until 1920 that the Circuit Court of Appeals affirmed the District Court’s decision. Finally, in 1922, a further appeal to the U.S. Supreme Court was dismissed by stipulation.

In 1918, North American Oil filed an amended tax return including the profits from the receivership in its 1916 taxable income. The IRS filed a deficiency, claiming that the income North American Oil gained from receivership should have been taxed in 1917 when they achieved control of it. The Board of Tax Appeals found that the money was taxable to the receiver in 1916. On appeal, the Circuit Court of Appeals held that the profits were taxable to the company as income in 1917. North American Oil appealed on the basis that the income was taxable either in 1916 when it was earned, or 1922 when the final decision regarding the land was made, and was granted a writ of certiorari.

=== Issue ===
Whether the profits paid to North American Oil in 1917 were taxable income for that particular year.

=== Analysis ===
The Commissioner of the Internal Revenue Service (IRS) argued that the 1916 profits should be included in the 1917 taxable year. North American Oil had not entered the profit as income in 1916 but did include it in an amended return for 1916 in 1918.

North American Oil appealed the IRS’ decision, and the Board of Tax Appeals held that the profits were taxable to the receiver as income in 1916 and made no finding whether the company’s accounts were kept on the cash receipts and disbursements basis or on the accrual basis. The Circuit Court of Appeals held that the profits were taxable to North American Oil as income in 1917 regardless of whether the company’s returns were made on the cash or on the accrual basis.

The United States Supreme Court affirmed the Circuit Court of Appeals. The Court analyzed the facts and arrived at three main conclusions:

1. The 1916 profits received by the receiver in 1916 were not income to the receiver.
2. The 1916 profits were not taxable to North American Oil as income in 1916 because it did not know, at that point, whether it would ever actually receive the money. North American Oil had no accession to wealth, or control of the income at that point. Through 1916, it was uncertain who was entitled to the profits.
3. The 1916 profits were not income in the year 1922—when the final judgment was entered and the litigation was finally terminated. North American Oil had a right to the 1916 profits in 1917, by order of the District Court. The Court held, “If a taxpayer receives earnings under a claim of right and without restriction as to its disposition, he has received income which he is required to return, even though it may still be claimed that he is not entitled to retain the money, and even though he may still be adjudged liable to restore its equivalent.” It was in 1917 that the profits became entitled to them, and they achieved access to and control of the gains. If the 1922 decision had ruled in favor of the government, North American Oil would have been entitled to a deduction in the amount of those lost profits.

== Holding ==
The U.S. Supreme Court affirmed the Circuit Court of Appeals. The 1916 profits were taxable income to North American Oil in 1917 when the District Court determined that the company had a claim of right to the profits, even though litigation was ongoing at that time.

== Impact ==
This case is significant for all taxpaying individuals, even into the 21st century, because the court articulated a claim of right doctrine. This doctrine generally states that when a taxpayer receives income for which they have a claim of right, it is then included as income in that year, when that claim of right is established. Later, if it turns out that the taxpayer must return the income, then the taxpayer will generally be entitled to take a deduction for the returned amount.

== See also ==
- List of United States Supreme Court cases, volume 286
