= Accrued liabilities =

Accrued liabilities are liabilities that reflect expenses that have not yet been paid or logged under accounts payable during an accounting period; in other words, a company's obligation to pay for goods and services that have been provided for which invoices have not yet been received. Examples would include accrued wages payable, accrued sales tax payable, and accrued rent payable.

There are two general types of Accrued Liabilities:

- Routine and recurring
- Infrequent or non-routine

Routine and recurring Accrued Liabilities are types of transactions that occur as a normal, daily part of the business cycle. Infrequent or non-routine Accrued Liabilities are transactions that do not occur as a daily part of the business cycle, but do happen from time to time.

== Example: Accrued Wages Payable ==
Most companies pay their employees on a predetermined schedule. Let's use an example with a company called "Imaginary company Ltd." It pays its employees each Friday for the hours worked that week.

This example will look at one month (June) and see how it records its Accrued Wages. Because wages are accrued for an entire week before they are paid, wages paid on Friday are compensation for the week ended June 5th. If the total wages for the 4 Fridays in June are $1000.00 ($250.00 per week or $50.00 per day), "Imaginary company Ltd." will make routine journal entries for wage payments at the end of each week. As the company pays wages it increases the 'Wage Expense' account and decreases the 'Cash' account. In this example, "Imaginary company Ltd." would pay wages on the 5th, 12th, 19th, and 26th of June. Assuming that the company prepares Financial statements each month, they owe an additional $200.00 in wages for the last four workdays in June (the 27th, 28th, 29th, & 30th). The company will not pay these wages until the next Friday of the following month on July 3; to make sure the company's report remains correct an adjustment must be made.

Wage Expense                 $1000.00
Cash                                  $1000.00

Wage Expense                 $200.00
Accrued Wages Payable                 $200.00

If the company does not record the 2nd transaction, both Expenses and Liabilities are understated. This will make the company's Income appear higher than it actually is, which can have very serious consequences.

Accrued liabilities is the direct opposite of prepaid expense. See Matching principle.
