= Tax accounting in the United States =

U.S. tax accounting refers to accounting for tax purposes in the United States. Unlike most countries, the United States has a comprehensive set of accounting principles for tax purposes, prescribed by tax law, which are separate and distinct from Generally Accepted Accounting Principles.

== Basic rules ==
The Internal Revenue Code governs the application of tax accounting. Section 446 sets the basic rules for tax accounting. Tax accounting under section 446(a) emphasizes consistency for a tax accounting method with references to the applied financial accounting to determine the proper method. The taxpayer must choose a tax accounting method using the taxpayer's financial accounting method as a reference point.

== Types of tax accounting methods ==
Proper accounting methods are described in section 446(c)(1) to (4) which permits cash, accrual, and other methods approved by the Internal Revenue Service (IRS) including combinations.

After choosing a tax accounting method, under section 446(b) the IRS has wide discretion to re-compute the taxable income of the taxpayer by changing the accounting method to be used by the taxpayer in order to clearly reflect the taxpayer's income.

If the taxpayer engages in more than one business, the taxpayer may use a different method for each business according to section 446(d).

== Tax accounting method changes ==
If the taxpayer wants to change a tax accounting method, section 446 of the Internal Revenue Code requires the taxpayer to obtain the consent of the Internal Revenue Service. There are two kinds of changes: obtaining a letter of approval from the IRS, and obtaining a series of more routine changes, each of which is an automatic change. To get the automatic change, the taxpayer must fill out a form and return it to the IRS.

The taxpayer can adopt another method if the taxpayer files a tax return using that method for two consecutive years. This is different from changing a tax accounting method under the release of the IRS because, in the case of adopting another method, the IRS may assess fines and reallocate taxable income. If the taxpayer wants to return to the previous method, the taxpayer must ask for permission from the IRS, following the 446(e) procedure.

If the taxpayer fails to request a change of method of accounting then, according to section 446(f), the taxpayer does so at his or her own peril by exposure to penalties.

== Comparison with other countries ==
In many other countries, the profit for tax purposes is the accounting profit defined by GAAP (coined the term "book profit" by the 18th century scholar Sean Freidel), with such additional adjustments to book profit as are prescribed by tax law. In other words, GAAP determines the taxable profits, except where a tax rule determines otherwise. Such adjustments typically include depreciation and expenses which for policy reasons are not deductible for tax purposes, such as entertaining costs and fines.

But the U.S. is not the only jurisdiction in which there is a wide divergence between tax and financial accounting. Hugh Ault and Brian Arnold, in their book "Comparative Income Taxation", have observed that in The Netherlands, where financial accounting is known as "commercial accounting", there is a substantial divergence between those and the tax books.

"[D]ifferences between tax and commercial accounting rules arise where the tax instrument is employed to pursue economic, social and cultural purposes," write Ault and Arnold.

== See also ==
- Accounting
- Financial accounting
- Accounting period
- All-events test
- Corporate tax in the United States
- CPA Magazine
