= Accrued jurisdiction =

Accrued jurisdiction within the context of the Australian legal system is the power held over state matters by federal courts. Accrued jurisdiction will occur when there are several cases brought to the Federal Court of Australia (FCA) where there are competing jurisdictions between them. In essence the state vests judicial authority in the federal court providing that a number of requirements are met. A claim that is based on a state law for example can be heard in a federal court depending on:

1. the actions done by respective parties
2. the relationship between the parties
3. the laws which attach rights or liabilities to the conduct and relationship of parties
4. whether the different claims arise under the same subject matter
5. whether the different claims are so related that the determination of one depends on the other

The above test is applied by the court and a decision reached as to whether the court has accrued jurisdiction. A convenient example of this process is outlined in the case Re Wakim; Ex parte McNally, where there is a conflict between state and federal jurisdictions. In this particular case it was held that accrued jurisdiction did exist but had it not the FCA would have been acting unconstitutionally had it proceeded hearing the case.
