= Accrual accounting in the public sector =

Method to record government financial activities

Accrual accounting in the public sector is a method to present financial information on government operations. Under accrual accounting, income and expenditure transactions are recognized when they occur, regardless of when the associated cash payments are made. The difference between public sector accrual accounting and cash accounting is most apparent in the treatment of capital assets (i.e. equipment, buildings, and public infrastructure that lasts many years). Under accrual accounting, expenditure on capital is added as an asset in the government's balance sheet in the year the capital is purchased, but the cost is not included in the year's budget as an operating expense. Instead, payment for capital used (i.e., the estimated depreciation or amortization) is included in that year's budget as an operating expense.

The usefulness of accrual accounting in the public sector remains in dispute. Advocates say a government that employs accrual accounting is less likely to underinvest in public infrastructure since large up-front capital costs are not recorded as a current period expenditure — rather, the expense is recorded over the years the capital is used (depreciates). Detractors counter that, following this reasoning, since the capital purchase does not generate a current period expense, accrual accounting may encourage excessive spending on capital and borrowing.

A central argument in favour of public sector accrual accounting over cash-based accounting is that it can provide more comprehensive information on government finances, including balance sheet data on assets, liabilities, and depreciation. However, accrual accounting income statements and balance sheets are based on technically complex and often arbitrary estimates of the value of public assets (market values are usually not available), so the information may not be reliable. This may impede citizen comprehension and the transparency of government finances. Other concerns with accrual accounting in the public sector are that it is more easily manipulated because it tends to be less transparent and is less understood by the public; a deficit/surplus under accrual accounting provides a less accurate measure of the government's borrowing and fiscal stimulus to the economy compared to a cash-accounting deficit/surplus; and accrual accounting is more costly because of the technical demands (often requiring new IT systems and more qualified accountants).

While accrual accounting has been used in the private sector for over a century, it has become common in the public sector only since around 2000. In 2020, 30% of 165 jurisdictions surveyed worldwide used accrual accounting.

== How accrual accounting differs from cash accounting in the public sector ==
Accrual accounting differs from cash-based accounting in two main dimensions:

(1) Recording government transactions: Under cash accounting, income and expenditure transactions are recorded when the associated cash is received or paid. By contrast, under accrual accounting, income and expenditure transactions are recognized when they occur, regardless of when payments are made. While some transactions generate a simultaneous cash payment, with transactions like the generation of a pension obligation and purchase of capital, they do not. (However, in many instances the cash accounting system can be modified to incorporate future costs — for example, future pension obligations associated with employment of a public sector worker can be recognized by allocating funds to a public sector employee pension plan.)

(2) Assets and liabilities in the government balance sheet: The second key aspect of public sector accrual accounting is that all government assets and liabilities are recognized in the government's balance sheet. These include financial assets (such as equities), non-financial assets (such as land and buildings), and liabilities such as civil service (government employee) pension obligations. Assets may be recorded at their historic cost, current market value, or some approximation; and are regularly revalued to indicate their financial value. By contrast, governments that follow pure cash accounting typically include only cash holdings on the assets side and, possibly, debt on the liability side of their balance sheets.

=== Accrual accounting and expenditure on capital ===
A fundamental difference between cash accounting and accrual accounting is the treatment of capital, such as equipment, buildings and public infrastructure. Under accrual accounting in the public sector, expenditure on capital is not included in net operating expense in the year it is purchased. Instead, payment for the capital used (the estimated depreciation or amortization) of the capital used in the year is included in the net operating balance in the year that it is depreciated. (Depreciation typically occurs over many years—for example, a $10 thousand piece of capital equipment that is expected to last for 10 years might be amortized as a $1 thousand operating expense each year of its life).

An example of the different treatment under cash and accrual accounting of a government's purchase of a building:

Under cash accounting: The government's budget surplus decreases (or deficit increases) by the amount of cash used (or debt incurred) to acquire the building in the year the government takes ownership. After the year of acquisition, the only expense recorded is the annual cost to operate and maintain the building.

Under accrual accounting: The building is included in the government's balance sheet as part of the government's assets. Specifically, the government's cash is reduced and the building is included as an asset instead. The annual cost of using the building (the depreciation in the reported value of the building) is recognized as an expense, as is the annual expense to operate and maintain the building.

With accrual accounting, the annual surplus/deficit shows whether revenues exceed the year's costs of operations only, since costs include expense from the use of capital assets, but not the expense of acquiring new capital assets. As a result, if expenditure on new capital assets is greater than depreciation on existing capital, government debt can increase in a year when a surplus (on operations) is reported. The increase in debt would, however, show up on the balance sheet as a liability right away. For this reason, to understand the change in a government's financial position, the change in government debt is an "extremely significant" indicator. Further, a requirement to report changes in debt may "act as a check on a government spending beyond its means."

Advocates of accrual accounting note that information provided with accrual accounting can be helpful when, for example, the government must decide whether to buy or lease a building, where buying may involve a large up-front cost. Under cash accounting a government subject to a balanced-budget rule may prefer to lease, only to avoid a large expense that leads to a current period deficit. With accrual accounting the large initial expenditure to buy a building does not enter the current year expenditures – only the depreciation of the building in the current year is included in the current year's budget.

== Concerns with accrual accounting in the public sector ==
=== Incentives for spending on capital and borrowing ===
With cash accounting the cost of capital assets is recognized in the budget in the year the expense is incurred. By contrast, under accrual accounting, for an asset that lasts, say 25 years, it is possible to commit resources in one year with the budgetary impact being spread for budget purposes over a 25-year period. For this reason, fiscal responsibility may be undermined because the political decision to spend on capital is not matched in time with when the expense is recorded in the budget. As a consequence, accrual accounting in the public sector may encourage excessive spending on capital.

Further, accrual accounting may encourage government borrowing because capital expenditures are not counted as a current year expense. This creates an opportunity to expand government capital programs without having to show any cost in terms of an increase in the (accrual accounting-based) deficit.

=== The transparency of government finances ===
The main argument in favour of public sector accrual accounting over cash-based accounting is that it can provide more comprehensive information on government finances, including balance sheet data on assets, liabilities, and depreciation. On the other hand, accrual accounting income statements and balance sheets are based on technically complex and often arbitrary estimates of the value of public assets (as market values are usually not available). Therefore, although accrual accounting may provide more information, the information may not be reliable.

With accrual accounting, there is room for manipulation in the choice of depreciation rates, the valuation of assets, and in the determination of what constitutes a capital expenditure. As a consequence, there is the potential for misrepresentation of the financial situation of a government. Legislatures have often shown resistance to the adoption of accrual budgeting due to its complexity, and jurisdictions that have adopted it generally have legislatures with a relatively weak role in the budget process.

Accrual-based financial information is usually communicated in technical language that is difficult for non-experts to understand. Compounding the challenge for users, there is very little understanding in the media of the concept of accrual. Journalists may have difficulty interpreting and analyzing presented figures, such as the difference between the deficit calculated under accrual accounting vs. cash accounting.

In Canada, there is a "disconnect" between the numbers that are presented in provincial government accrual accounting-based budgets and the general public's understanding of provincial finances. Even observers who take the trouble to read the budget documents are often confused by the way the accounts are presented and are not confident that the numbers adequately represent the government's fiscal position. In Australia, a country that uses both accrual and cash-based fiscal targets, stakeholders tend to focus on cash-based targets since they are more easily understood and "may be perceived as more reliable and relevant."

=== The deficit is less useful as an in indicator of fiscal stimulus ===
An advantage of measuring a government's fiscal balance (deficit or surplus) using its cash balance is that the cash deficit/surplus incorporates spending on capital, so it measures the demand from the government on the current resources of the economy: i.e., the net fiscal stimulus. By contrast, the accrual-accounting based deficit/surplus measures just the net operating balance. By including government expenditure on capital, the cash accounting deficit/surplus is a better indicator of the government's demand for resources and, therefore, its impact on the resources available to the private sector. A Norwegian government study argues that a jurisdiction using cash-based budgeting is better positioned to engage in countercyclical fiscal policy since there is a direct link between budget allocations and actual cash flows.

=== Greater technical demands ===
Accrual accounting is more costly than cash accounting, as new IT systems and more qualified accountants are usually needed. Introduction of the system is also a long process. The cost of moving to accrual accounting in Germany was estimated at €3.1 billion, and France spent some $1.7 billion to switch from cash-based to accrual-based standards.

== Impact on public sector decision-making ==
There is little research into whether accrual accounting improves public sector decision-making. Counties in the German state of Bavaria that adopted accrual accounting (compared to counties that remained using cash accounting) did not exhibit significantly different behavior in terms of investment, borrowing (public debt), government efficiency, or voter participation. However, there was an increase in operating costs, consistent with the increased expense from preparing financial statements that are more complex and require more time-consuming asset valuations. Similarly, the introduction of accrual accounting in Japan had limited impact on municipalities' expenditures and revenues.

A study of eleven OECD countries found scant evidence of an impact from the introduction of accrual accounting on budget preparation or fiscal policy, except that two countries said it had driven their government and parliament to create a fund to finance public sector (i.e. civil service) pensions. Requiring information on assets and liabilities in the government balance sheet may have pushed policy makers to make better decisions in the sense that it is more difficult to create future liabilities (such as pension benefits) without disclosing the financial implications. Also, New Zealand closed its civil service defined-benefit pension scheme to new employees when the first set of accrual accounts revealed the size of the plan liability.

== The budget deficit/surplus under accrual accounting ==
The budget deficit (or surplus) is defined differently under cash and accrual accounting, as a result of the different treatment of capital assets. In contrast to cash accounting, under full accrual accounting spending on new capital is not recorded as an operating expense so it does not increase the deficit (or reduce the surplus).

To improve understanding of budgets, the IMF's Government Finance Statistics Manual recommends that governments produce both a deficit based on cash-flow accounts and an accrual-based operating statement. New Zealand, for example, includes both deficit measures in the press releases that accompany the publication of its monthly accounts. Governments have been urged to prepare their financial accounts so that it is easier to compare and reconcile cash-based and accrual-based deficit measures.

=== Accrual accounting and budget rules ===
It is possible for fiscal rules to be applied on an accrual basis, but in a large majority of OECD countries, government spending limit rules are cash-accounting based. This may be because a cash-based spending rule is relatively simple to use to demonstrate compliance, and is closely related to a government's immediate financing requirements. In Switzerland, budgets and financial statements are prepared on an accrual basis but the federal government anchors its fiscal policy with a cash-based Debt Brake rule. The Canadian Parliamentary Budget Officer says that if a balanced budget rule was introduced, reconciliation between the accrual budget framework and Parliament's cash-based appropriations bills and estimates would become increasingly important for parliamentary scrutiny of government fiscal performance.

== Public sector accrual accounting standards ==
Accrual accounting in the public sector can be supported by different accrual-based standards for government financial reporting. International Financial Reporting Standards (IFRS) have been established for the private sector, and the International Public Sector Accounting Standards (IPSAS) are based on the IFRS, with adaptions where necessary for the public sector. The UK follows the IFRS in its public sector accounting (with modest modifications), and it achieves 96% compatibility in public sector accounting with the IPSAS. France has not explicitly adopted the IPSAS accounting standard but its general government accounting practice is 90% compliant with the IPSAS standard (the accounting rules of public entities follow those applicable to private entities whenever possible in France).

The European Union is incorporating accrual accounting as part of the development of European Public Sector Accounting Standards (EPSAS). One objective with EPSAS is harmonization of the accrual accounting standard. Harmonization would facilitate comparisons, as a wide diversity of interpretations exist both within and between countries on the depreciation and valuation of fixed assets (i.e., historical cost vs. replacement cost vs. market value).

== International adoption of accrual accounting in the public sector ==
Accrual accounting has been standard in private businesses for over a century, but has become common in the public sector only since around the year 2000. International organizations, including the OECD, the IMF and the European Union advocate public sector accrual accounting with the expectation it will enhance budget transparency, efficiency, and accountability of policymakers.

One factor that led to the spread of accrual accounting in the public sector is the development of computerized financial management information systems, which reduce the cost of collecting and consolidating accrual-based information. The 2008 financial crisis, and concern about heavily indebted countries also triggered interest in accrual financial information.

Switzerland and some Scandinavian countries started using a form of government accrual accounting early in the 20th century, but New Zealand was a pioneer when it introduced accrual accounting at the central government level in 1990. Australia, Canada, the UK, and the US adopted central government accrual accounting around a decade later, and a wave of European countries followed. Around three quarters of OECD countries use accrual accounting. In 2020, 30% of 165 jurisdictions surveyed used accrual accounting, and the share is forecast to increase to 50% by 2025.

The financial information from accrual accounting is meant to complement, rather than entirely replace, traditional cash budgeting. According to the IMF, governments need to establish a well-functioning cash accounting system before contemplating a move to accrual accounting, and effective monitoring of cash receipts and outlays will continue to be needed to assess government budgets even after moving to full accrual accounting.

== See also ==
- Accrual
- Cash method of accounting
- International Public Sector Accounting Standards
- Public sector balance sheet
