= Vendor-specific objective evidence =

In accounting practices, vendor-specific objective evidence (VSOE) is a method of revenue recognition allowed by US GAAP that enables companies to recognize revenue on specific items on a multi-item sale based on evidence specific to a company that the product has been delivered.

== Description ==
GAAP rules and pronouncements come from the Financial Accounting Standards Board (FASB) which is a non-profit organization that the Securities and Exchange Commission (SEC) has created to promulgate and to amend the rules of GAAP reporting as required. The Accounting Standards Executive Committee of the American Institute of Certified Public Accountants (AICPA) instituted SOP 97–2.

== Purpose ==
The purpose of GAAP is to level the playing field for public-company reporting – protecting shareholders and investors by preventing earnings from being stated before they are actually earned. Therefore, a company selling software with a package including installation and a one-year maintenance contract can only record the sale on a deferred basis and earnings are recognized over the term of the maintenance contract. However based on VSOE, allocation occurs by splitting the fee amongst the products and related elements – which is the price established by the vendor for the separate sale of each element and are able to recognize some of the revenue at delivery. This allows companies that sell items that have software licenses, support contracts and hardware items recognizing the revenue of the hardware items on delivery, and the software license or support contract based on the fulfillment of the time the contract it is related to.

== Common use ==
VSOE revenue recognition is commonly used by companies that sell software products and services in multiple-element bundles. VSOE focuses on the fair market value of an item sold individually, as opposed to the assigned sales value of the item sold as part of a multiple-element bundle. You can use the VSOE feature to determine VSOE prices of items and defer the recognition of this revenue.

The VSOE feature is intended for use by United States companies to maintain GAAP compliance with the American Institute of Certified Public Accountants (AICPA) Statement of Position 97-2 (SOP 97–2) and SOP 98-9 (the residual method).
