= Percentage-of-completion method =

Work-in-progress evaluation

Percentage of completion (PoC) is an accounting method of work-in-progress evaluation, for recording long-term contracts. GAAP allows another method of revenue recognition for long-term construction contracts, the completed-contract method.

== When to use ==
The accounting for long term contracts using the percentage of completion method is an exception to the basic realization principle. This method is used wherein the revenues are determined based on the costs incurred so far. Accounting guidance generally requires that if a loss is expected on a long-term contract, the full amount of the loss must be recognized immediately under the percentage-of-completion method. The percentage of completion method is used when:

- Collections are assured
- The accounting system can:
1. Estimate profitability
2. Measure progress toward completion.

Losses are recognized in the year when they are discovered, the same way as for the completed contract method. The balance sheet presentation is the same as in the completed contract method.

== Formulas used ==
Revenues and gross profit are recognized each period based on the construction progress, in other words, the percentage of completion. Construction costs plus gross profit earned to date are accumulated in an asset account (construction in process, also called construction in progress), and progress billings are accumulated in a liability account (billing on construction in process). Construction-in-progress are generally not classified as inventory as it would not be in-line with IAS2.9 (Inventories to be stated at lower of cost or NRV).

Although the formula for recognizing income in the current period can vary, a widely accepted one is as follows:

$$Inc_{k}=[\frac{\sum_{i=1}^{m}Costs_{i}}{ \sum_{i=1}^{N}E(Costs_{i})} \cdot\sum_{i=1}^{N}Revenues_{i})]-\sum_{i=1}^{m-1}Inc_{i}.\,$$

where... $m= \,$ the number of periods lapsed since the inception of the contract.

$N= \,$ the expected length of the contract
$k= \,$ the current period
$E= \,$ the total estimated cost of contract

== Examples ==
For example, let's say our total estimated cost for the contract is $10,000 and our contract value is $12,000. We know that project will be completed in 2 years. Now, after the first year we see that total cost incurred in this first year is $3,000. So according to the percentage-of-completion method: Cost percentage = 3000/10000 = 30%; so we will recognize 30% revenue in the income statement for the first year.

Income statement of AnantPurohit corporation Pvt. Ltd. for the year ended on xx/yy/zzzz:

Sales	3,600 (30% of 12,000)
Cost of goods	3,000
Profit	600

In the next year, some more complicated parts enter the game. Let's say that after completion of the second year, our expected cost changes to 11,000. Assume our cost to date is 5,500 (3,000 in the first year, 2,500 in the second), the percentage completed is 5,500/11,000 = 50%. Thus, the revenue to be recognized is (50% of 12,000) – 3,600 (previously recognized) = 2,400

Income statement of AnantPurohit corporation Pvt. Ltd. for the year ended on xx/yy/zzzz+1:

Sales	2,400
Cost of goods	2,500 (5,500 till date – 3,000 last year)
Loss	100

Now let's say that for the next year, our total cost estimation is increased to 15,000 due to increases in raw material and labor costs. We know that we are going to incur a loss of 3000 at the end of the contract period. For the third year, our cost to date reaches 10,500, so according to PoC: Percentage completion = 10,500/15,000 = 70% Revenue = 70% of 12,000 – previously recognized = 8,400 – 6,000 = 2,400. However, because we are going to have a total loss of 3,000 on the contract..... we must recognize the total loss in the period it is estimated. As a result, our Cost of goods will be 5,900 (total loss recognized because of 500 profit recognized in previous periods [3,500] + Sales [2,400]); we reached this inductively by figuring the Sales and the Loss before the Cost of goods.

Income statement of AnantPurohit corporation Pvt. Ltd. for the year ended on xx/yy/zzzz+2:

Sales	2,400
Cost of goods	5,900
Loss	3,500

In final year, our cost is 4,500 and revenue is 3,600. But we record only 3,600 in Cost of goods because we already recognized the total loss in the last period.

Sales	3,600
Cost of goods	3,600
Profit/loss	0

Total Profit/Loss from the contract = 600-100-3,500= 3,000 Net Loss

== Balance sheet presentation ==
- In current assets is shown excess of costs over billings: the current asset accounts are "due on accounts", a receivable account, and "construction in progress" ("CIP" - or "costs in excess of billings").
- In current liabilities is shown the excess of billings over costs ("progress billings"): these are progress billings on uncompleted contracts in excess of costs.

== Disclosures ==
As per IAS 11.42-43, an entity shall present:

(a) the gross amount due from customers for contract work as an asset; and

(b) the gross amount due to customers for contract work as a liability.

(These should be separate line-items on the face on the balance sheet.)

The gross amount due from/to customers for contract work is the net amount of:

(a) costs incurred plus recognized profits; less

(b) the sum of recognized losses and progress billings

for all contracts in progress.
