= Completed-contract method =

The Completed-contract method is an accounting method of work-in-progress evaluation, for recording long-term contracts. GAAP allows another method of revenue recognition for long-term construction contracts, the percentage-of-completion method. With this method, revenue is recognized when the contract is fulfilled. The contract is considered complete when the costs remaining are insignificant.

== General description ==
Accounting for long term contracts can be done in two ways: through the completed-contract method and the percentage of completion method. The choice between the two depends on the provisions of SOP 81-1 from the AICPA. The completed-contract method recognizes income only when the contract is completed or substantially completed.

== When to use ==
The completed-contract method is used when costs are difficult to estimate, there are many ongoing small jobs (one time work), and projects are of short duration. This method can be used only when the job will be completed within two years from inception of a contract.

== Balance sheet presentation ==
- In current assets is shown excess of costs over billings: the current asset accounts are "due on accounts", a receivable account, and "construction in progress" ("CIP" - or "costs in excess of billings").
- In current liabilities is shown the excess of billings over costs ("progress billings"): these are progress billings on uncompleted contracts in excess of costs.
