= Matching principle =

Accounting method

In accrual basis accounting, the matching principle (or expense recognition principle) dictates that an expense should be reported in the same period as the corresponding revenue is earned. The revenue recognition principle states that revenues should be recorded in the period in which they are earned, regardless of when the cash is transferred. By recognising costs in the period they are incurred, a business can determine how much was spent to generate revenue, thereby reducing discrepancies between when costs are incurred and when revenue is realised. In contrast, cash basis accounting requires recognising an expense when the cash is paid, irrespective of when the expense was incurred.

If no cause-and-effect relationship exists (e.g., a sale is impossible), costs are recognised as expenses in the accounting period in which they expired, i.e., when the product or service has been used up or consumed (e.g., spoiled, dated, or substandard goods, or services no longer needed). Prepaid expenses are not recognised as expenses but as assets until one of the qualifying conditions is met, which then results in their recognition as expenses. If no connection with revenues can be established, costs are recognised immediately as expenses (e.g., general administrative and research and development costs).

Prepaid expenses, such as employee wages or subcontractor fees paid out or promised, are not recognised as expenses. They are considered assets because they provide probable future benefits. As a prepaid expense is used, an adjusting entry is made to update the value of the asset. For example, with prepaid rent, the cost for the period would be deducted from the Prepaid Rent account.

== See also ==
- Accrual
- Comparison of cash and accrual methods of accounting
- Deferrals in accrual accounting
- FIFO and LIFO accounting, different ways of matching stock to sales
- Revenue recognition
