= Claim of right doctrine =

In the tax law of the United States the claim of right doctrine causes a taxpayer to recognize income if they receive the income even though they do not have a fixed right to the income. For the income to qualify as being received there must be a receipt of cash or property that ordinarily constitutes income rather than loans or gifts or deposits that are returnable, the taxpayer needs unlimited control on the use or disposition of the funds, and the taxpayer must hold and treat the income as its own. This law is largely created by the courts, but some aspects have been codified into the Internal Revenue Code.

== History ==
The claim of right doctrine, as it dictates whether the "right" to the income subject to a contingency that may take the income away is taxable in the US, originated in the North American Oil Consolidated v. Burnet decision. This court decision said that a taxpayer's income subject to a contingency that may take away the income but a taxpayer who receives it "without restriction as to its disposition...has received income" which the taxpayer "is required to [report]", even though the taxpayer "may still be adjudged liable to restore" it. In other words, A taxpayer must report the receipt of income for the time that she or he has control over it.

If a taxpayer ends up having to return the income recognized under the claim of right doctrine, then the taxpayer may receive a tax credit for that amount according to the Internal Revenue Code, if such a credit is a greater tax benefit than a deduction.

The courts limited the claim of right doctrine and will not allow the IRS to make the taxpayer recognize income if there are significant restrictions on the taxpayer's disposition of the income.

== See also ==
- Tax accounting
- Cash Method v. Accrual Method
