= Deferral =

Term in accounting

In accounting, a deferral is any account where the income or expense is not recognised until a future date.

In accounting, deferral refers to the recognition of revenue or expenses at a later time than when the cash transaction occurs. This concept is used to align the reporting of financial transactions with the periods in which they are earned or incurred, according to the matching principle and revenue recognition principle. Deferrals are recorded as either assets or liabilities on the balance sheet until they are recognized in the appropriate accounting period.

Two common types of deferrals are deferred expenses and deferred income. A deferred expense represents cash paid in advance for goods or services that will be consumed in future periods. On the other hand, deferred income (or deferred revenue) is a liability that arises when payment is received for goods or services that have yet to be delivered or fulfilled.

== Deferred charge ==
A deferred charge is a cost recorded in a later accounting period for its expected future benefit, or to comply with the matching principle, which matches costs with revenue. Deferred charges include costs such as those related to startup activities, obtaining long-term debt, or running major advertising campaigns. These are carried as non-current assets on the balance sheet until they are amortized.

Deferred charges typically extend over five years or more and occur less frequently than prepaid expenses, such as insurance, interest, or rent. Financial ratios often exclude deferred charges from total assets because they lack physical substance (i.e., they do not generate cash directly) and cannot be used to reduce total liabilities.

== Deferred expense ==
A deferred expense, also known as a prepayment or prepaid expense, is an asset representing cash paid in advance for goods or services to be received in a future accounting period. For example, if a service contract is paid quarterly in advance, the remaining two months at the end of the first month are considered a deferred expense. The prepaid amount is then recognized as an expense in subsequent accounting periods, with the corresponding amount deducted from the prepayment.

A deferred expense is similar to accrued revenue, where proceeds from goods or services delivered are recognized as revenue in the period earned, while the cash for them is received later.

For example, if insurance is paid annually, 11/12 of the cost would be recorded as a prepaid expense, decreasing by 1/12 each month as the expense is recognized. This prevents overstatement of expenses in the period of payment and avoids understating them in subsequent periods.

Similarly, cash paid for goods or services not received by the end of the accounting period is added to prepayments to prevent overstating expenses in the payment period. These costs are recognized in the income statement (P&L) in the period the goods or services are received and deducted from prepayments on the balance sheet.

== Deferred revenue ==
Deferred revenue (unearned revenue or deferred income) is a liability representing cash received for goods or services that will be delivered in a future accounting period. Once the income is earned, the corresponding revenue is recognized, and the deferred revenue liability is reduced. Unlike accrued expenses, where a liability is an obligation to pay for received goods or services, deferred revenue reflects an obligation to deliver goods or services for which payment has already been received.

For example, if a company receives an annual software license fee upfront on January 1 but its fiscal year ends on May 31, the company using accrual accounting would only recognize five months' worth (5/12) of the fee as revenue in the current fiscal year's profit and loss statement. The remaining amount is recorded as deferred income (a liability) on the balance sheet for that year.

== See also ==
- Deferred tax
- Revenue recognition
- Matching principle
- Accruals in accounting
