= Accrual =

In finance, adding together of interest or different investments over a period of time

In accounting and finance, an accrual is an asset or liability that represents revenue or expenses that are receivable or payable but which have not yet been paid.

In accrual accounting, the term accrued revenue refers to income that is recognized at the time a company delivers a service or good, even though the company has not yet been paid. Likewise, the term accrued expense refers to liabilities that are recognized when a company receives services or goods, even though the company has not yet paid the provider.

Accrued revenue is often recognised as income on an income statement and represented as an accounts receivable on the balance sheet. When the company is paid, the income statement remains unchanged, although the accounts receivable is adjusted and the cash account increased on the balance sheet. On the other hand, an accrued expense is recognised as an expense on the income statement and represented as a liability on the balance sheet. Once payment is made, the income statement remains unaffected, while the accounts payable is adjusted and the cash account reduced on the balance sheet.

In finance, accrual often refers to the accumulation of interest or investment income over a period of time, though the interest or income has yet to be paid.

== Accruals in accounting ==
Accrual accounting recognizes revenues and expenses when they are earned or incurred, not necessarily when cash is received or paid. For instance, if a company delivers a product in one financial year but will receive payment in the next, the revenue is recognized in the current financial year. Similarly, the company who receives the product also recognizes the expenses incurred in the current financial year, even if the actual payment is made later.

This approach contrasts with cash basis accounting, which recognizes transactions only when cash changes hands.

=== Accrued revenue ===
Accrued revenue, also known as accrued assets, refers to income earned but not yet received. For example, a company delivering a service or product may record the revenue even if payment will be received later. In rental agreements, where billing cycles don’t align with financial periods, companies must accrue revenue based on the days the service was provided before the billing date.

=== Accrued expense ===
An accrued expense is a liability for goods or services received but not yet paid for. These expenses are recorded when incurred, even if the payment will happen later. For instance, a company may receive services in one period but pay for them in the next. The uncertainty surrounding the timing or exact amount of accrued expenses is usually minor compared to provisions, which account for larger uncertainties.

IAS 37 explains that accrued expenses differ from provisions because they are more certain in timing and amount. Accrued expenses, like employee vacation pay, are often listed under trade and other payables:

"Provisions can be distinguished from other liabilities such as trade payables and accruals because there is uncertainty about the timing or amount of the future expenditure required in settlement. By contrast:

- Trade payables are liabilities to pay for goods or services that have been received or supplied and have been invoiced or formally agreed with the supplier.
- Accruals are liabilities to pay for goods or services that have been received or supplied but have not been paid, invoiced, or formally agreed with the supplier, including amounts due to employees (e.g., accrued vacation pay). Although it is sometimes necessary to estimate the amount or timing of accruals, the uncertainty is generally much less than for provisions."

== Other uses ==
In payroll, a common benefit that an employer will provide for employees is a vacation or sick accrual. This means that as time passes, an employee accumulates additional sick leave or vacation time and this time is placed into a bank. Once the time is accumulated, the employer or the employer's payroll provider will track the amount of time used for sick or vacation.

When referring to clinical trials, the definition of "accrual" is either the process of recruiting patients into a trial, or the number of patients in a trial.

== See also ==
- Accrued interest
- Accrued jurisdiction
- Accrued liabilities
- Revenue recognition
- Matching principle
- Accrual basis accounting
- Deferrals in accounting
- Accrual accounting in the public sector
