= Center for Economic and Social Justice =

American non-profit organization

The Center for Economic and Social Justice (CESJ) is a non-profit, educational and research institution organized under § 501(c)(3) of the United States Internal Revenue Code. The think tank is registered as a non-stock corporation in Washington, DC, and located in Arlington, Virginia, U.S. Founded in 1984, CESJ studies, promotes, and develops programs incorporating a free enterprise approach to global economic justice through expanded capital ownership.

== Mission and philosophy ==
CESJ's stated mission is to “advance liberty and justice for every person through equal opportunity and access to the means to become a capital owner.” Its approach is based on a synthesis of - the social doctrine of Pope Pius XI as analyzed by CESJ co-founder the late Reverend William J. Ferree, S.M., Ph.D., detailed in The Act of Social Justice (1943) and Introduction to Social Justice (1948), and the economic justice principles developed by lawyer-economist Louis O. Kelso and Aristotelian philosopher Mortimer J. Adler in their two books, The Capitalist Manifesto (1958) and The New Capitalists (1961). CESJ considers the subtitle of the latter — “A Proposal to Free Economic Growth from the Slavery of Savings” — to be particularly significant in its challenging of the fundamental assumption of Keynesian economics that the only way to finance new capital is to cut consumption and accumulate money savings. Many CESJ members and supporters do not agree that the terms “capitalist” and “capitalism” accurately describe the system Kelso and Adler framed. Karl Marx and the socialists, they claim, invented these terms to condemn what they saw as the inherent greed, exploitation, and injustices inherent in a system where the powers and profits of land and productive assets became concentrated within a tiny elite of private owners. To remedy the abuses of concentrated capital ownership, Marx and Engels in The Communist Manifesto (1848) declared, “[T]he theory of the Communists may be summed up in the single sentence: the abolition of private property.” In contrast, Kelso turned the socialist's central assumption around by asserting that private property, far from being the problem, is essential for creating a truly just free market global economy. An economically just economy is one in which every citizen can be a capital owner without taking property away from the currently wealthy (whom the system allowed to monopolize ownership of increasingly productive labor displacing-technologies).

CESJ defines capitalism as "a system in which proprietary rights to profits and control over capital assets is concentrated in a small private elite", and socialism as "a system in which capital ownership or control is vested in the State". In both systems most people are dependent on wages and welfare for subsistence. CESJ prefers the term "Just Third Way" to describe the Kelsonian alternative. According to CESJ, "the Just Third Way is a system based on equality in which capital is broadly owned instead of concentrated, and everyone has equality of opportunity to gain personal income from private property rights both from one's human (or labor) contributions and one's non-human (or capital) contributions to the productive process".

CESJ bases its policies and programs on respect for human dignity and "sovereignty of the person." This is realized through empowering every individual economically and politically with non-coercive means to acquire direct ownership of capital. Citing the example of leveraged Employee Stock Ownership Plans (ESOPs), CESJ points out how capital can be and has been acquired by new owners through personal access to capital credit designed to be repayable with the future earnings of the capital itself. Access to such credit and other non-redistributive social means can be universalized by reforming specific institutions of society (see the section below under “Capital Homesteading”).

== History ==
=== Alexandria Tire Company (Egypt) ===
In 1990, Norman G. Kurland, CESJ's president, headed the team that implemented the world's first ESOP (called a “Workers Shareholders Association” under a new Egyptian law) in a developing country for the Alexandria Tire Company using funds provided by USAID. Writing to The Wall Street Journal, Melanie Tammen of the Competitive Enterprise Institute cited the Alexandria Tire Company as the sole worthy achievement in USAID's record of aid to Egypt.

=== Capital Homesteading ===
In 1982 Norman G. Kurland (later president of CESJ) wrote a concept paper on the “Capital Homestead Act” at the request of Dr. Norman Bailey, then-Chief Economist for International Affairs of the National Security Council. Conceived as a “New Marshall Plan” for stimulating rapid, non-inflationary growth, the proposal contained Federal Reserve, tax and other expanded capital ownership reforms intended to enable each citizen to accumulate a “capital homestead” of income-generating assets sufficient to meet ordinary living expenses and reduce over time the growing costs of unsustainable Federal entitlement spending.

The Capital Homesteading concept was an expansion of the “Second Income Plan” (later called “The Industrial Homestead Act”) developed by Louis O. Kelso and Walter Lawrence in 1965. Referring to Kelso's ideas, then-Governor Ronald Reagan declared in 1974 that “Lincoln signed the Homestead Act. . . . We need an Industrial Homestead Act.” The Kelso Plan to make every citizen an owner was renamed the “Capital Homestead Act” in CESJ's Capital Homesteading for Every Citizen (2004).

• In 1992 Kurland was invited by then-U.S. Democratic Congressman and Majority Whip-at-Large Mike Espy (later appointed Secretary of Agriculture by President Clinton) to speak on a panel workshop of the Congressional Black Caucus. C-Span televised the presentation of the Capital Homestead agenda. At the invitation of Secretary of Agriculture Espy, CESJ representatives participated in the 1994 Senior Policy Retreat for 75 top-level USDA officials. Norman Kurland served as a “challenge speaker,” and delivered a white paper on a new expanded ownership thrust for U.S. agricultural and rural development policy.
• In February 2001 CESJ received a grant from the William H. Donner Foundation to develop an expanded ownership strategy to address the crisis in the U.S. Social Security system. The report was released in December 2002.
• On January 1, 2004, CESJ published an expanded version of the strategy paper under the title Capital Homesteading for Every Citizen: A Just Free Market Solution for Saving Social Security. CESJ describes the book as an “economic blueprint for the Just Third Way,” adding some new features and changing the name of Kelso’s comprehensive set of reforms from his “Second Income Plan” and Ronald Reagan’s “Industrial Homestead Act.”

=== Communications ===
Since its founding, CESJ has made as a central part of its mission the dissemination of what it believes is a radical advance in moral philosophy and market economics. Much of CESJ's work involves educating others through writings, meetings, seminars and its web site, about a new global paradigm, which CESJ calls “the Just Third Way.”

• In collaboration with the Scholars for Social Justice and the World Institute for Development and Peace, CESJ drafted and met jointly on August 23, 1997 in St. Louis to approve “The Universal Declaration on the Sovereignty of the Human Person Under God.”
• Alberto Magaña, former President of El Salvador, translated into Spanish CESJ’s article on “Closing the Wealth Gap: A Just Third Way” (“Cerrando la Brecha de la Riqueza: Una Tercera Vía Justa”). The translation appeared in the October 2000 issue of Entorno, published by the Universidad Tecnológica de El Salvador.
• Since 2005 CESJ members have rallied every April at the entrance of the Federal Reserve Building in Washington, D.C. to draw attention to the critical role that every central bank could play in getting money power to every citizen to purchase new capital.
• CESJ representatives have addressed U.S. and international audiences at the invitation of such groups as the Inter-American Development Bank, the World Bank, the International Monetary Fund, the American Bankers Association, the AFL-CIO’s George Meany Center for Labor Studies, the Heritage Foundation, the Society for International Development, the International Development Law Institute of Rome, the Reason Foundation, the National Center for Neighborhood Enterprises, The ESOP Association, the National Center for Employee Ownership, the Foundation for Enterprise Development (now the Beyster Institute), the Czech Academy of Sciences, and committees of the Russian Duma.
• CESJ speakers have conducted seminars on the expanded ownership approach to privatization for high-level government policy makers, business executives and labor officials from developing countries, and have offered classes through the International Law Institute, the Center for Financial Engineering in Development, the Citizens Network for Foreign Affairs, and the International Management Group/INTRADOS.

== Publications ==
Beginning with the 1986 orientation book for the Presidential Task Force on Project Economic Justice (below), Every Worker an Owner, and the Task Force Report, High Road to Economic Justice, CESJ has published books on public policy and monetary and tax reform, as well as compendia of previously published articles.

Curing World Poverty: The New Role of Property (1994) was published in a joint venture with the Central Bureau of the Catholic Central Union of America in St. Louis under the “Social Justice Review” imprint. Capital Homesteading for Every Citizen: A Just Free Market Solution for Saving Social Security (2004), a “policy manual for change,” was published under CESJ's “Economic Justice Media” imprint. With the 2012 publication of The Restoration of Property: A Reexamination of a Natural Right, CESJ began a series of “Paradigm Papers” to address specific issues.

CESJ has also published three titles in its “Economic Justice Classics” series: annotated editions of William Cobbett's The Emigrant’s Guide (1829), William Thomas Thornton's A Plea for Peasant Proprietors (1848, 1873) and Harold G. Moulton's The Formation of Capital (1935).

== Political stance ==
CESJ has no official political stance. The “American Revolutionary Party” has adopted CESJ's “Just Third Way” as part of its platform. In 2011 members of CESJ formed the Coalition for Capital Homesteading to advocate the passage of a Capital Homestead Act.

== Bibliography ==
- Adler, Mortimer J., and Kelso, Louis O., The Capitalist Manifesto. New York: Random House, 1958.
- Adler, Mortimer J., and Kelso, Louis O., The New Capitalists. New York: Random House, 1961.
- Ferree, Rev. William J., Introduction to Social Justice. New York: Paulist Press, 1948.
- Ferree, Rev. William J., The Act of Social Justice. Washington, DC: The Catholic University of America Press, 1943.
- Keynes, John Maynard, The General Theory of Employment, Interest, and Money. New York: Harcourt, Brace, Jovanovich, 1965.
- Marx, Karl, and Engels, Friedrich, The Communist Manifesto. London: Penguin Books, 1967.
