= Employee stock ownership =

System giving employees stake in a company's ownership

Employee stock ownership, or employee share ownership, is where a company's employees own shares in that company (or in the parent company of a group of companies). US employees typically acquire shares through a share option plan. In the UK, Employee Share Purchase Plans are common, wherein deductions are made from an employee's salary to purchase shares over time. In Australia it is common to have all employee plans that provide employees with $1,000 worth of shares on a tax free basis. Such plans may be selective or all-employee plans. Selective plans are typically only made available to senior executives. All-employee plans offer participation to all employees (subject to certain qualifying conditions such as a minimum length of service).

Most corporations use stock ownership plans as a form of an employee benefit. Plans in public companies generally limit the total number or the percentage of the company's stock that may be acquired by employees under a plan. Compared with worker cooperatives or co-determination, employee share ownership may not confer any meaningful control or influence by employees in governing and managing the corporation.

In the United States, private companies often use employee share ownership to maintain the political feasibility of the founding business plan and culture after the founders have left. Generally, the most senior employees own a majority stake and represent the leading voice in the company that employs them. They may be required to sell back the shares upon leaving the company.

A number of countries have introduced tax advantaged share or share option plans to encourage employee share ownership.

== Types of plan ==
To facilitate employee stock ownership, companies may allocate their employees with stock, which may be at no upfront cost to the employee, enable the employee to purchase stock, which may be at a discount, or grant employees stock options. Shares allocated to employees may have a holding period before the employee takes ownership of the shares (known as vesting). The vesting of shares and the exercise of a stock option may be subject to individual or business performance conditions.

Various types of employee stock ownership plans are common in most industrial and some developing countries. Executive plans are designed to recruit and reward senior or key employees. In the U.S. and the UK there is a widespread practice of sharing this kind of ownership broadly with employees through plans in which participation is offered to all employees. The tax rules for employee share ownership vary widely from country to country. Only a few, most notably the U.S., the UK, and Ireland have significant tax laws to encourage broad-based employee share ownership. For example, in the U.S. there are specific rules for Employee Stock Ownership Plans (ESOPs). In the UK there are two all-employee tax advantaged plans that enable employees to acquire shares: the Share Incentive Plan and the Sharesave share option plan.

Varieties of employee share ownership plan (including associated cash based incentive plans) include:

=== Direct purchase plans ===
Direct purchase plans simply allow employees to buy shares in the company with their own money. In several countries, there are special tax-qualified plans that allow employees to buy stock either at a discount or with matching shares from the company. For instance, in the U.S., employee stock purchase plans enable employees to put aside after-tax pay over some period of time (typically 6–12 months) then use the accumulated funds to buy shares at up to a 15% discount at either the price at the time of purchase or the time when they started putting aside the money, whichever is lower. In the U.K., Share Incentive Plans allow employee purchases that can be matched directly by the company.

=== Stock options ===
Stock options give employees the right to buy a number of shares at a price fixed at grant for a defined number of years into the future. Options, and all the plans listed below, can be given to any employee under whatever rules the company creates, with limited exceptions in various countries.

=== Restricted stock ===
Restricted stock, and its close relative restricted stock units, give employees the right to acquire or receive shares, by gift or purchase, once the employees meet certain restrictions, such as working a certain number of years or meeting a performance target.

=== Phantom stock ===
Phantom stock pays a future cash bonus equal to the value of a certain number of shares.

=== Stock appreciation rights ===
Stock appreciation rights provide the right to the increase in the value of a designated number of shares, usually paid in cash but occasionally settled in shares (this is called a "stock–settled" SAR).

== Employee ownership ==
Employee ownership is a way of running a business that can work for different sized businesses in diverse sectors.

Employee ownership requires employees to own a significant and meaningful stake in their company. The size of the shareholding must be significant. This is accepted as meaning where 25 percent or more of the ownership of the company is broadly held by all or most employees (or on their behalf by a trust). There are three basic forms of employee ownership:

- direct ownership of shares by all employees as individuals;
- indirect (or trust) ownership on behalf of all employees by the trustee of an employee trust; and
- the hybrid model which combines both direct and indirect ownership.

In addition, the employees' stake must give employees a meaningful voice in the company's affairs by it underpinning organisational structures that promote employee engagement in the company.

Employee ownership is conceptually distinct from broad-based equity compensation, in which employees receive shares or share-based awards (such as stock options, restricted stock, and employee stock purchase plans) primarily as a financial benefit without changes to corporate governance. Whereas equity compensation gives employees a financial interest in the firm, employee ownership transfers a significant share of ownership and corporate control to the workforce.

Census-based empirical research has linked adoption of an Employee Stock Ownership Plan (ESOP) to measurable increases in labor productivity.

Research on the succession crisis in small and medium-sized enterprises internationally has identified employee ownership as a mechanism aligned with owners' non-financial goals of continuity, legacy, and stakeholder protection, while reducing the market and governance frictions that often limit succession options.

In the UK organisations such as the Employee Ownership Association (EOA), Scottish Enterprise, Wales Co-operative Centre and Co-operatives UK play an active role in promoting employee ownership.

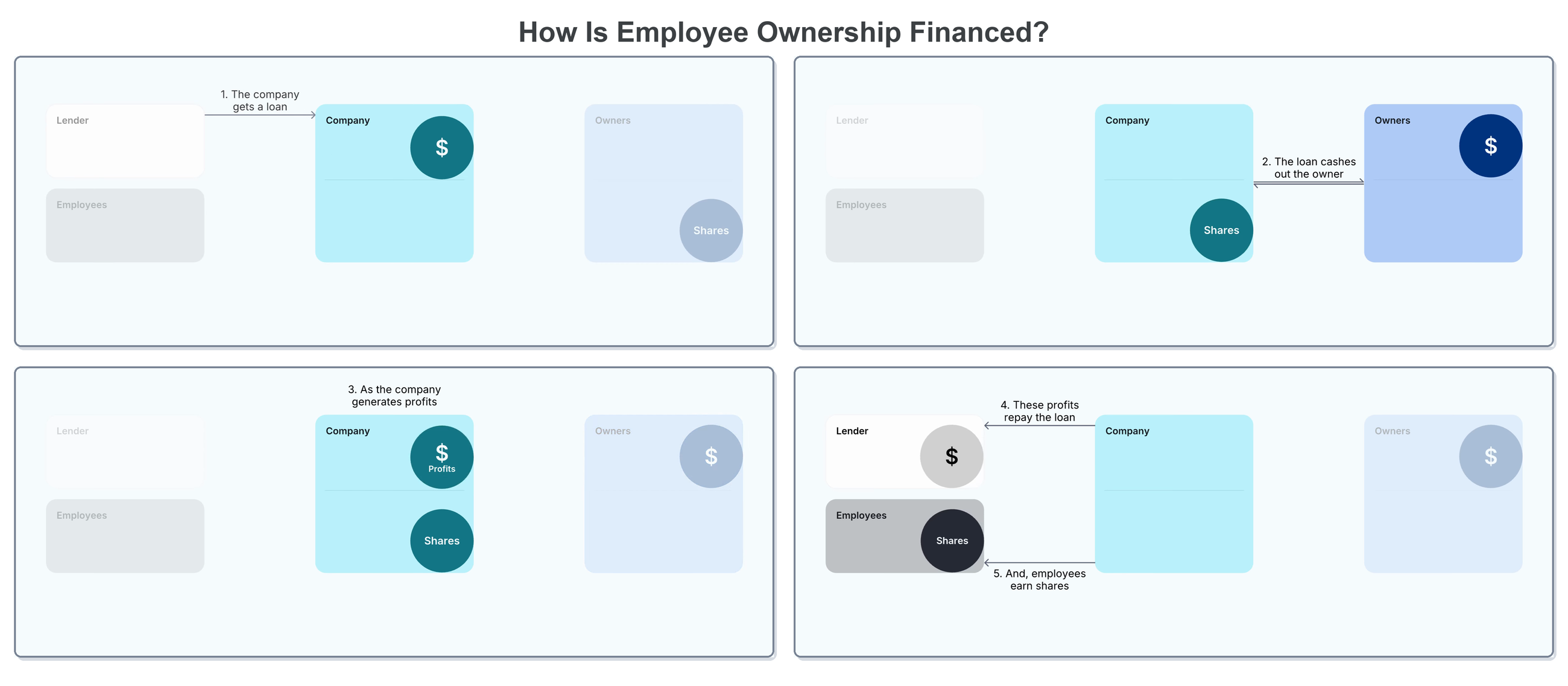
How an employee buyout is financed: the company borrows to buy out the owner, then repays the loan from profits as employees accrue the shares (the leveraged structure used by ESOPs).

An employee controlled company is a majority employee-owned company. This might arise through an employee buyout, structured through an employee ownership trust or through direct purchase of shares by employees as individuals. Employee-owned companies are totally or significantly owned (directly or indirectly) by their employees.

Different forms of employee ownership, and the principles that underlie them, have contributed to the emergence of an international social enterprise movement. A public service mutual, by definition, has a significant degree of employee ownership, influence or control, but most public service mutuals identify themselves as social enterprises rather than employee owned.

A worker cooperative is a cooperative owned and self-managed by its workers. It is a type of employee owned company that operates according to the international values of co-operation and adheres to an additional code, beyond the core international principles, focused on democracy and participation in the workplace. Among the most prominent and studied companies which is based wholly on co-operative principles is the Spanish Mondragon Cooperative Corporation. Spanish law, however, requires that members of the Mondragon Corporation are registered as self-employed and are not employees. This further differentiates this type of co-operative ownership (in which self-employed owner-members each have one voting share, or shares are controlled by a co-operative legal entity) from employee ownership (where ownership is typically held as a block of shares on behalf of employees using an employee ownership trust, or company rules embed mechanisms for distributing shares to employees and ensuring they remain majority shareholders).

== By country ==
=== United Kingdom ===
Employee Share Ownership Plans (ESOPs) became widespread for a short period in the UK under the government of Margaret Thatcher, particularly following the Transport Act 1985, which deregulated and then privatised bus services. Councils seeking to protect workers ensured that employees accessed shares as privatisation took place, but employee owners soon lost their shares as they were bought up and bus companies were taken over. The disappearance of stock plans was dramatic.

=== United States ===
In the United States, there is a widespread practice of employee stock ownership. It began with industrial companies and today is particularly common in the technology sector but also companies in other industries, such as Publix, Wawa, WinCo Foods, and Starbucks.

The dominant structure for majority employee ownership in the United States is the employee stock ownership plan (ESOP), a tax-qualified retirement vehicle established under the Employee Retirement Income Security Act of 1974. ESOPs draw on the work of investment banker Louis Kelso, who advocated broadening capital ownership through employee stock purchases. Section 1042 of the Internal Revenue Code permits owners of closely held C corporations who sell at least 30 percent of company stock to an ESOP to defer capital gains tax by reinvesting the proceeds in qualified replacement property, a provision widely cited as the key tax incentive supporting the structure's adoption. Based on Department of Labor Form 5500 filings for plan years ending in 2023, 6,525 ESOPs covered 15.1 million participants and held an estimated $2.0 trillion in assets, including employer securities and other retirement-plan assets. Although KSOPs comprised 15 percent of the plans, they accounted for 87 percent of participants and 88 percent of assets.

Employee-ownership transitions are nuanced transactions involving choices among multiple structural vehicles, such as employee stock ownership plans (ESOPs), employee ownership trusts, and worker cooperatives, and have historically required specialist advisors, contributing to limited uptake among small and medium-sized businesses. Software platforms have recently emerged that help owners compare employee ownership against private-equity and strategic-sale alternatives, including the Palo Alto–based startup Zolidar.

In his 2020 presidential campaign, Bernie Sanders proposed that 20% of stocks in corporations with over $100 million in annual revenue be owned by the corporation's workers.

== See also ==
- Center on Business and Poverty
- Co-determination
  - Worker representation on corporate boards of directors
- Cooperative
- Worker cooperative
- Economics of participation
- Employee benefit trust
- Labour law
- List of employee-owned companies
- Market socialism
- Social ownership
