= Employee trust =

An employee trust is a trust for the benefit of employees.

The employees that an employee trust benefits are usually defined by reference to employment by a particular company (or group of companies). In addition to employees, the beneficiaries may, under the terms of the trust, include some or all of former employees (of the relevant company or group) and individuals defined by reference to their marriage to, civil partnership with or dependence on such an employee (or former employee). Charities may also be included in the class of beneficiaries.

An employee trust is typically established by the relevant employing company (or a company in the employing group) entering into a trust deed (or other trust instrument) which sets out the terms of the trust, including who is to act as its trustee. An employee trust could also be established by an individual, for example a shareholder in the relevant company, including by their Will.

The choice of who is the trustee of the trust and the type of property subject to the trust will vary depending on the purpose of the employee trust.

Many employee trusts are discretionary trusts, where the trustee has discretion to select which beneficiaries benefit, when and how. It is possible that beneficiaries have fixed or absolute interests, for example, where shares awarded to employees under an employee share ownership plan remain held in an employee trust.

Government policy and tax rules in the United Kingdom, the United States and elsewhere encourage the use of employee trusts to support employee share ownership or employee ownership. However, Government policy and tax rules may also counteract certain uses of employee trusts, for example, when they are used avoid the payment of tax on remuneration.

== Purposes ==
Employee trusts exist for many purposes and have a wide range of titles.

If the terms of the trust meet requirements prescribed by tax or other regulations, then the employee trust is likely to be known by the name given in the relevant regulations, for example, a share incentive plan or an employee stock ownership plan. If the purpose of an employee trust is to provide pensions or other retirement related benefits it is likely to be referred to as a pension plan or retirement benefits scheme, rather than an employee trust.

The term employee trust (or, in the UK, employee benefit trust) is most likely to be used to describe a trust, where the trustee has wide-ranging powers, to be used at its discretion. Such a general employee trust may, nevertheless, in practice be intended to achieve a particular purpose and be named accordingly. For example:

- a discretionary bonus trust or remuneration trust, which provides cash payments to beneficiaries;
- a staff benevolent fund, which provides sick pay or meets medical expenses;
- an educational trust, which provides funding for the education of employees' children;
- an employee share trust, which holds shares in order to facilitate employee share ownership in a company. Shares may be warehoused in an employee trust until allocated to participants under an employee share or share option plan. Depending on the type of plan, once allocated, shares may then be held by the trustee on behalf of individual employees. In a private company, the trustee may provide a marketplace for employees to buy and sell shares acquired under a share or share option plan; and
- an employee ownership trust, which holds shares on behalf of employees on a long term basis in order to achieve and support employee ownership of a company.

== Influence of tax rules ==
The extent to which particular types of employee trust are used in a country at any time can be significantly influenced by prevailing tax rules or other regulations, especially in relation to taxing the direct or indirect payment of remuneration, including policies on what is considered unacceptable tax avoidance.

=== Counteracting schemes to avoid tax on remuneration ===
In the UK the use of employee benefit trusts to provide loans to employees (or anything that is a reward or recognition, in connection with an employee's employment) was, in particular, curtailed by anti-avoidance legislation introduced with effect from 9 December 2010. This legislation imposed an immediate charge to income tax on the full value of such loans (or other benefits) provided from that date. These new tax rules are referred to as the disguised remuneration rules.

Between 2001 and 2009, the Glasgow-based football club Rangers F.C. used employee benefit trusts based in Jersey to avoid large amounts of income tax, inheritance tax and National Insurance by providing unsecured loans to employees that the employer had no intention of getting repaid while the employee lived. The Supreme Court ruled in 2017 that although the (indefinitely extended) loans were valid, the money paid into the trust by Rangers for an employee's benefit was income subject to income tax and national insurance deductions in the same manner as if it was paid directly to the employee. The resulting tax liability of the liquidated Rangers F.C. plc was not settled until 2022.

=== Encouraging employee share ownership and employee ownership ===
The UK Government supports the use of employee benefit trusts as part of genuine arrangements to create employee share ownership or employee ownership. It has over the years provided tax advantages for specific types of employee trust, including:

- the qualifying employee share ownership trust (or QUEST): From 1989 to accounting periods beginning on or after 1 January 2003 a company contributing funds to a QUEST could get a tax deduction as a statutory right for its contribution without having to rely on making a claim based on general case law principles.
- the HM Revenue & Customs approved profit sharing scheme (or profit sharing trust): From 1978 until 2002 employees under this scheme received a special tax treatment for share awards, but this was phased out following the introduction of the share incentive plan. No new profit sharing schemes were approved after 5 April 2001. Awards under existing schemes ceased on 31 December 2002, although employees could continue to hold tax-advantaged shares from past appropriations.

Current arrangements supported by the UK Government to promote employee share ownership and employee ownership using trusts with special tax advantages include:

- the share incentive plan, and
- the employee ownership trust
