= Executive compensation =

Pay and benefits for upper management

Executive compensation is composed of both the financial compensation (executive pay) and other non-financial benefits received by an executive from their employing firm in return for their service. It is typically a mixture of fixed salary, variable performance-based bonuses (cash, shares, or call options on the company stock) and benefits and other perquisites all ideally configured to take into account government regulations, tax law, the desires of the organization and the executive.

The three decades from the 1980s saw a dramatic rise in executive pay relative to that of an average worker's wage in the United States, and to a lesser extent in a number of other countries. Observers differ as to whether this rise is a natural and beneficial result of competition for scarce business talent that can add greatly to stockholder value in large companies, or a socially harmful phenomenon brought about by social and political changes that have given executives greater control over their own pay. Recent studies have indicated that executive compensation should be better aligned with social goals (e.g. public health goals). The rate of executive pay is an important part of corporate governance, and is often determined by a company's board of directors.

== Types ==
In a modern corporation, the CEO and other top executives are often paid a salary, which is predetermined and fixed, plus an array of incentives (bonuses) commonly referred to as the variable component of the remuneration package.

The variable component of compensation or remuneration can be broken down into three time frames:

- short-term incentives (STIs)
- medium-term incentives (MTIs)
- long-term incentive plans (LTIPs)

=== Short-term incentives (STIs) ===
As employees rise through the ranks in the business, it is likely that short-term incentives are added to their total remuneration package. The combination of Fixed Pay and Short Term Incentive is referred to as Total Cash Compensation (TCC). Short-term incentives usually are formula driven and have some performance criteria attached (typically pre-agreed KPIs) depending on the role of the executive. For example, the Sales Director's performance related bonus may be based on incremental revenue growth; a CEO's could be based on incremental profit margin and/or revenue growth. Bonuses are after-the-fact (not formula driven) and often discretionary. Short-term incentives can also take other forms, namely, fringe benefits, employee benefits and paid expenses (perquisites). Common fringe benefits can vary from meal plans to health insurance cover, retirement plans, company cars and even interest-free loans for the purchase of housing. Fringe benefits are also often tax deductible for the employee. The level of STI relative to basic salary is typically a function of seniority eg. a junior executive may have an STI that is capped at 10% of basic salary whereas for a senior executive, it may rise to 50% or more.

=== Medium-term incentives (MTIs) ===
Medium-term incentives are often associated with the delivery of corporate strategic goals and therefore extend beyond the scope of short-term incentives. The performance of the company in achieving the predetermined targets is the basis for the benefit which is usually cash. There is often no determination of an individual's contribution to achieving the targets - the performance is calculated purely at the corporate level. As with STIs, the weight of the MTIs relative to the basic salary is dependent on seniority. Because deployment of corporate strategies typically covers a 2-5 year period, the MTIs are only paid out when an assessment of the achievement is possible. This feature is therefore seen as supporting employee retention. MTIs are not common, most publicly listed companies disclose only STIs and LTIs, although purists may argue that one or both of these are more aligned to a medium term reward (e.g STIs are often deferred for a number of years, and LTIs are often measured over a period of only 3 years).

=== Long-term incentives (LTIPs) ===
The most common form of LTIs in the US are stock options. In Australia Performance Rights are more common - see below. This is where executives are given options to buy shares in their employment company, often at a significant discount, but at some point in the future. To reach that point in the future, the time taken is defined as the vesting period. The number of options granted is subject to the company's performance relative to very high-level metrics such as total shareholder return versus a select number of other listed companies. These can be very valuable incentives - in 2017, S&P 1500 named executives held $31.4 billion of in-the-money stock options.

A Performance Right also known as a Zero Exercise Priced Option (or ZEPO) is the right to receive a share in the company at some time in the future if a performance metric is achieved. Typical performance metrics are financial ratios (e.g. Earnings Per Share (EPS) growth, Return on Equity (ROE), etc) and/or use some form of Total Shareholder Return (TSR) metric

Vesting refers to the period of time before the recipient exercises the right to take ownership of the shares for a predetermined price and realize value. Vesting can occur in two ways: "single point vesting" (vesting occurring on one date), and "graded vesting" (which occurs over a period of time) and which may be "uniform" (e.g., 20% of the options vest each year for the next 5 years) or "non-uniform" (e.g., 20%, 30% and 50% of the options vest each year for the next three years). If the company has performed well and the actual share price at the time of vesting has grown to be higher than the strike price (the pre-agreed purchase price), the executive can realise a capital gain should he/she sell the stock and pocket the proceeds. If the share price is lower than the strike price at vesting, it is unlikely the executive would exercise his option immediately, if at all. Following the vesting period, the options can be exercised for a predetermined period, typically a 10 year period, before they lapse.

Vesting refers to the number of options or rights that convert to shares in accordance with the performance criteria. Typical practice would be for 50% of the options or rights to vest at some predetermined target (e.g. if TSR is at least the median of the comparator group), and 100% to vest at some predetermined stretch target (e.g. if TSR is at least at the 75th percentile of the comparator group). Below target results in zero vesting. "Cliff vesting" refers to the portion below 50% (it fell off the cliff).

Supporters of stock options say they align the interests of the CEOs with those of shareholders, since options are valuable only if the stock price remains above the option's strike price. This form of incentive is also designed to reward long term service of an individual and is an important retention tool. Stock options are now counted as a corporate expense (non-cash), which impacts a company's income statement and makes the distribution of options more transparent to shareholders. Critics of stock options charge that they are granted without justification as there is little reason to align the interests of CEOs with those of shareholders. Empirical evidence shows since the wide use of stock options, executive pay relative to workers has dramatically risen. Moreover, executive stock options contributed to the accounting manipulation scandals of the late 1990s and abuses such as the options backdating of such grants. Finally, researchers have shown there to be relationships between executive stock options and stock buybacks, implying that executives use corporate resources to inflate the stock prices before they exercise their options. Stock options also may incentivise executives to engage in risk-seeking behaviour. This is because the value of a call options increases with increased volatility (see options pricing). Stock options also present a potential up-side gain (if the stock price goes up) for the executive, but no downside risk (if the stock price does down, the option is simply not exercises). Stock options therefore can incentivise excessive risk-seeking behaviour that can lead to catastrophic corporate failures.

Another way executives are incentivised over the long term is with restricted stock, which is stock given to an executive that cannot be sold until certain conditions are met and has the same value as the market price of the stock at the time of the grant. As the relative size of stock option grants has been reduced, the number of companies granting restricted stock (either alongside stock options or in lieu of) has increased. Restricted stock has its detractors, too, as it has value even when the stock price falls.

Restricted stock is an increasingly common element of the Short Term Incentive (STI). The STI is often dependent on performance against Key Performance Indicators, which are reported to the Board by management. There is increasing shareholder lobbying for "clawback" provisions to enable the company to recapture rewards that were improperly received. Deferring realisation of the reward for one or more years gives the Board more ability to re-capture the reward in such circumstances. Technically recapturing deferred STI before it vests is a "malus" rather than a clawback.

As an alternative to simple vested restricted stock, companies have been adding performance type features to their grants. These grants, which could be called performance shares, do not vest or are not granted until these conditions are met. The performance conditions could be based on, for example, earnings per share or return on equity.

== Levels ==
The levels of compensation in all countries has been rising dramatically over the past decades. Not only is it rising in absolute terms, but also in relative terms. In 2022, the world's highest paid chief executive officers and chief financial officers were American. They made 400 times more than average workers—a gap 20 times bigger than it was in 1965. In 2019 the highest paid CEO was Tesla's Elon Musk at $595.3 million The U.S. has the world's highest CEO's compensation relative to manufacturing production workers. According to one 2005 estimate the U.S. ratio of CEO's to production worker pay is 39:1 compared to 31.8:1 in UK; 25.9:1 in Italy; 24.9:1 in New Zealand. This trend continues to rise.

== Mathematical Formula ==
In a globalised world economy, all businesses compete with one another to hire their CEO from the same talent pool. In its most simple form, the talent of any individual CEO is determined by the percentage increase in profit margins the individual is expected to bring to the firm. The desired outcome of this is that, in part due to efficient allocation of resources in the economy, the largest firm will be matched with similarly the best CEO, the second largest firm will be matched with the second best CEO and so forth. While there have been numerous methods for formulating executive compensation, some complex and some very basic, the method proposed by Xavier Gabaix is a good reference point. It is worth noting that results vary significantly after share options, bonuses and benefits are taken into consideration.

The compensation of CEO number $n$ equates to:

$w(n)=D(n^*)S(n)^{\gamma-b}S(n^*)^b$

where:

$w(n)$ is the wages of the $n$th best talented CEO,
$S(n)$ is the size of that firm,
$S(n^*)$ is the size of the reference firm (e.g., the size of the median firm in the S&P 500),
$\gamma = 1$ for constant returns to scale,
$\gamma - b$ = the power law parameter in the distribution of CEO compensation, and
$D(n^*)$ denotes a constant, dependent on model parameters, such as the scarcity of talent, assuming the wages of the least talented CEO are zero. (Of course, few CEOs work for nothing. However, All models are wrong, but some are useful, and this may still be useful.

Consider, for example, a firm that is 27 times bigger than the median firm and suppose that $b$ = 2/3. The CEO's remuneration would be 3 times larger than the median CEO's compensation. Should the size of all the firms increase 27 times, however, the compensation of the CEO for the company that is 27 times larger, will increase 27 times over. This formula exhibits a strong correlation between the rise in executive compensation and the rise in value of the S&P 500.

== Controversy ==
The explosion in executive pay has become controversial, criticized not only by those on the left, but by proponents of shareholder capitalism such as Peter Drucker, John Bogle, Warren Buffett also.

The idea that stock options and other alleged pay-for-performance are driven by economics has also been questioned. According to economist Paul Krugman,

"Today the idea that huge paychecks are part of a beneficial system in which executives are given an incentive to perform well has become something of a sick joke. A 2001 article in Fortune, "The Great CEO Pay Heist" encapsulated the cynicism: You might have expected it to go like this: The stock isn't moving, so the CEO shouldn't be rewarded. But it was actually the opposite: The stock isn't moving, so we've got to find some other basis for rewarding the CEO.` And the article quoted a somewhat repentant Michael Jensen [a theorist for stock option compensation]: `I've generally worried these guys weren't getting paid enough. But now even I'm troubled.'"

Recently, empirical evidence showed that compensation consultants only further exacerbated the controversy. A study of more than 1,000 US companies over six years finds "strong empirical evidence" that executive compensation consultants have been hired as a "justification device" for higher CEO pay.

Defenders of high executive pay say that the global war for talent and the rise of private equity firms can explain much of the increase in executive pay. For example, while in conservative Japan a senior executive has few alternatives to his current employer, in the United States it is acceptable and even admirable for a senior executive to jump to a competitor, to a private equity firm, or to a private equity portfolio company. Portfolio company executives take a pay cut but are routinely granted stock options for the ownership of ten percent of the portfolio company, contingent on a successful tenure. Rather than signaling a conspiracy, defenders argue, the increase in executive pay is a mere byproduct of supply and demand for executive talent. However, U.S. executives make substantially more than their European and Asian counterparts.

Share repurchases have been criticized for causing misaligned incentives between executive compensation and market capitalization of the company. Executive compensation is frequently tied to share price or earnings per share which, due to the decreasing number of shares caused by share repurchasing, is diverging from the market capitalization.

=== Asia ===
Since the early 2000s, companies in Asia are following the U.S. model in compensating top executives, with bigger paychecks plus bonuses and stock options. However, with a great diversity in stages of development in listing rules, disclosure requirements and quality of talent, the level and structure of executive pay is still very different across Asia countries. Disclosures on top executive pay is less transparent compared to that in the United Kingdom. Singapore and Hong Kong stock exchange rules are the most comprehensive, closely followed by Japan's, which has stepped up its requirements since 2010.

=== Australia ===
In Australia, shareholders can vote against the pay rises of board members, but the vote is non-binding. Instead the shareholders can sack some or all of the board members. Australia's corporate watchdog, the Australian Securities and Investments Commission has called on companies to improve the disclosure of their remuneration arrangements for directors and executives.

=== Canada ===
A 2012 report by the Canadian Centre for Policy Alternatives demonstrated that the top 100 Canadian CEOs were paid an average of C$8.4 million in 2010, a 27% increase over 2009, this compared to C$44,366 earned by the average Canadian that year, 1.1% more than in 2009. The top three earners were automotive supplier Magna International Inc. founder Frank Stronach at C$61.8 million, co-CEO Donald Walker at C$16.7 million and former co-CEO Siegfried Wolf at C$16.5 million.

=== China ===
Executive compensation in China still differs from compensation in Europe and the U.S. but the situation is changing rapidly. Based on a research paper by Conyon, executive compensation in China is mostly composed of salaries and bonuses, as stock options and equity incentives are relatively rare elements of a Chinese senior manager's compensation package. Since 2016 Chinese-listed companies were required to report total compensation of their top managers and board members. However, transparency and what information companies choose to release to the public varies greatly. Chinese private companies usually implement a performance-based compensation model, whereas State-owned enterprises apply a uniform salary-management system. Executive compensation for Chinese executives reached US$150 000 on average and increased by 9.1% in 2017.

=== Europe ===
In 2008, Jean-Claude Juncker, president of the European Commission's "Eurogroup" of finance ministers, called excessive pay a "social scourge" and demanded action. In 2013, there was a push by then European Commissioner for Internal market and Services, Michel Barnier, to legislate that shareholder be given votings rights to challenge executive pay, similar to regulations enforceable in Australia. The European Union as a whole, lags other OECD nations in the regulation of executive compensation, however individual member nations have stepped up and taken it upon themselves to increase regulatory measures.

=== United Kingdom ===
Although executive compensation in the UK is said to be "dwarfed" by that of corporate America, it has caused public upset. In response to criticism of high levels of executive pay, the Compass organisation set up the High Pay Commission. Its 2011 report described the pay of executives as "corrosive".

In December 2011/January 2012 two of the country's biggest investors, Fidelity Worldwide Investment, and the Association of British Insurers, called for greater shareholder control over executive pay packages. Dominic Rossi of Fidelity Worldwide Investment stated, "Inappropriate levels of executive reward have destroyed public trust and led to a situation where all directors are perceived to be overpaid. The simple truth is that remuneration schemes have become too complex and, in some cases, too generous and out of line with the interests of investors." Two sources of public anger were Barclays, where senior executives were promised million-pound pay packages despite a 30% drop in share price; and Royal Bank of Scotland where the head of investment banking was set to earn a "large sum" after thousands of employees were made redundant.

In 2024, Alexander Pepper, Professor of Management at LSE published a historical study titled “CEO pay in the United Kingdom, 1968–2022” in the journal Business History, in which he constructs an original dataset on CEO remuneration trends over five decades and evaluates competing explanations such as optimal contracting versus market failure for the significant rise in CEO pay in large UK listed firms.

=== United States ===
The U.S. Securities and Exchange Commission (SEC) has asked publicly traded companies to disclose more information explaining how their executives' compensation amounts are determined. The SEC has also posted compensation amounts on its website to make it easier for investors to compare compensation amounts paid by different companies.

Since the 1990s, CEO compensation in the US has outpaced corporate profits, economic growth and the average compensation of all workers. Between 1980 and 2004, Mutual Fund founder John Bogle estimates total CEO compensation grew 8.5% year, compared to corporate profit growth of 2.9%/year and per capita income growth of 3.1%. By 2006 CEOs made 400 times more than average workers—a gap 20 times bigger than it was in 1965. As a general rule, the larger the corporation, the larger the CEO compensation package.

The share of corporate income devoted to compensating the five highest paid executives of (each) public firms more than doubled from 4.8% in 1993–1995 to 10.3% in 2001–2003. The pay for the five top-earning executives at each of the largest 1500 American companies for the ten years from 1994 to 2004 is estimated at approximately $500 billion in 2005 dollars.

As of late March 2012, USA Today's tally showed the median CEO pay of the S&P 500 for 2011 was $9.6 million.

Lower level executives also have fared well. About 40% of the top 0.1% income earners in the United States are executives, managers, or supervisors (and this does not include the finance industry) — far out of proportion to less than 5% of the working population that management occupations make up.

A study by University of Florida researchers found that highly paid CEOs improve company profitability as opposed to executives making less for similar jobs. However, a review of the experimental and quasi-experimental research relevant to executive compensation, by Philippe Jacquart and J. Scott Armstrong, found opposing results. In particular, the authors conclude that "the notion that higher pay leads to the selection of better executives is undermined by the prevalence of poor recruiting methods. Moreover, higher pay fails to promote better performance. Instead, it undermines the intrinsic motivation of executives, inhibits their learning, leads them to ignore other stakeholders, and discourages them from considering the long-term effects of their decisions on stakeholders" Another study by Professors Lynne M. Andersson and Thomas S. Batemann published in the Journal of Organizational Behavior found that highly paid executives are more likely to behave cynically and therefore show tendencies of unethical performance.

== Regulation ==
There are a number of strategies that could be employed as a response to the growth of executive compensation.

- Extend the vesting period of executives' stock and options. Current vesting periods can be as short as three years, which encourages managers to inflate short-term stock price at the expense of long-run value, since they can sell their holdings before a decline occurs.
- As passed in the Swiss referendum "against corporate Rip-offs" of 2013, investors gain total control over executive compensation, and the executives of a board of directors. Institutional intermediaries must all vote in the interests of their beneficiaries and banks are prohibited from voting on behalf of investors.
- Disclosure of salaries is the first step, so that company stakeholders can know and decide whether or not they think remuneration is fair. In the UK, the Directors' Remuneration Report Regulations 2002 introduced a requirement into the old Companies Act 1985, the requirement to release all details of pay in the annual accounts. This is now codified in the Companies Act 2006. Similar requirements exist in most countries, including the U.S., Germany, and Canada.
- A say on pay - a non-binding vote of the general meeting to approve director pay packages, is practised in a growing number of countries. Some commentators have advocated a mandatory binding vote for large amounts (e.g. over $5 million). The aim is that the vote will be a highly influential signal to a board to not raise salaries beyond reasonable levels. The general meeting means shareholders in most countries. In most European countries though, with two-tier board structures, a supervisory board will represent employees and shareholders alike. It is this supervisory board which votes on executive compensation.
- Another proposed reform is the bonus–malus system, where executives carry down-side risk in addition to potential up-side reward.
- Progressive taxation is a more general strategy that affects executive compensation, as well as other highly paid people. There has been a recent trend to cutting the highest bracket tax payers, a notable example being the tax cuts in the U.S. For example, the Baltic States have a flat tax system for incomes. Executive compensation could be checked by taxing more heavily the highest earners, for instance by taking a greater percentage of income over $200,000.
- Maximum wage is an idea which has been enacted in early 2009 in the United States, where they capped executive pay at $500,000 per year for companies receiving extraordinary financial assistance from the U.S. taxpayers. The argument is to place a cap on the amount that any person may legally make, in the same way as there is a floor of a minimum wage so that people can not earn too little.
- Debt Like Compensation - If an executive is compensated exclusively with equity, he will take risks to benefit shareholders at the expense of debtholders. Thus, there are several proposals to compensate executives with debt as well as equity, to mitigate their risk-shifting tendencies.
- Indexing Operating Performance is a way to make bonus targets business cycle independent. Indexed bonus targets move with the business cycle and are therefore fairer and valid for a longer period of time.
- Two strikes - In Australia an amendment to the Corporations Amendment (Improving Accountability on Director and Executive Remuneration) Bill 2011 puts in place processes to trigger a re-election of a Board where a 25% "no" vote by shareholders to the company's remuneration report has been recorded in two consecutive annual general meetings. When the second "no" vote is recorded at an AGM, the meeting will be suspended and shareholders will be asked to vote on whether a spill meeting is to be held. This vote must be upheld by at least a 50% majority for the spill (or re-election process) to be run. At a spill meeting all directors current at the time the remuneration report was considered are required to stand for re-election.
- Independent non-executive director setting of compensation is widely practised. An independent remuneration committee is an attempt to have pay packages set at arms' length from the directors who are getting paid.
- In March 2016, the Israeli Parliament set a unique law that effectively sets an upper bound to executive compensation in financial firms. According to the Law, an annual executive compensation greater than 2.5 million New Israeli Shekel (approximately US$650,000) cannot be granted by a financial corporation if it is more than 35 times the lowest salary paid by the corporation.
- In the United States, clawback provisions may exist due to Dodd-Frank and the Sarbanes-Oxley Act.

== See also ==
- Agency cost
- Corporate-owned life insurance
- Golden handshake
- Golden parachute
- Options backdating
- Proxy Advisor
- Remuneration
- We are the 99%
