= Waitrose =

British supermarket chain owned by John Lewis Partnership

Waitrose Limited
- Type: Subsidiary
- Industry: Supermarket
- Founded: 1904
- Founder: Wallace Waite; Arthur Rose; David Taylor
- Headquarters: Bracknell, England
- Number of locations: 329 (April 2023)
- Area served: United Kingdom
- Key people: Tom Denyard (Managing Director)
- Products: Food
- Services: Supermarkets; Online shopping
- Revenue: ▲£7.7 billion (2024)
- Operating income: ▲£1.1 billion (2024)
- Number of employees: ▲49,600 (2024)
- Parent: John Lewis Partnership
- Website: waitrose.com

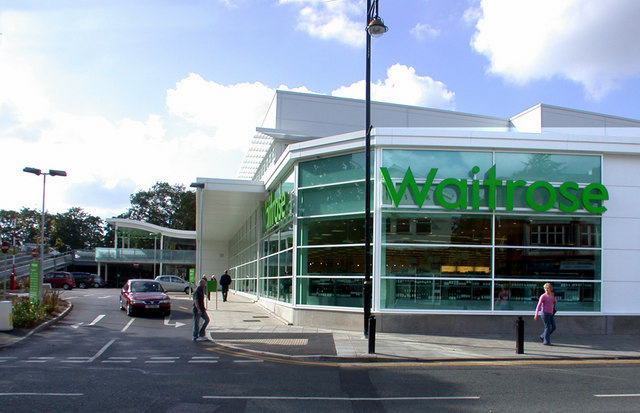
The Waitrose branch in Cheadle Hulme, Stockport, built in 2007, was Waitrose's first purpose-built retail outlet in Northern England.

Waitrose Limited (trade name Waitrose & Partners) is a British supermarket chain, founded in 1904 as Waite, Rose & Taylor, later shortened to Waitrose. In 1937, it was acquired by the John Lewis Partnership, the UK's largest employee-owned business, which continues to operate the brand. The company's head offices are in Bracknell, Berkshire.

As of April 2023, Waitrose & Partners operates 329 shops across Great Britain and the Channel Islands, including 65 "little Waitrose" convenience shops. It also exports products to 52 countries and has locations in the Middle East.

Known for its "upmarket" reputation, as denoted by The Daily Telegraph and The Guardian, Waitrose has been positioned as a "premium" supermarket. Nonetheless, in 2013, then managing director Mark Price has claimed that its prices are "competitive" with those of Tesco, a "mid-market" chain. The company holds a royal warrant to supply groceries, wine, and spirits to King Charles III.

== History ==
Founded in 1904 by Wallace Waite, Arthur Rose and David Taylor, Waitrose & Partners began as a small grocery, Waite, Rose & Taylor, in Acton, West London. In 1908, two years after David Taylor had left the business, the name "Waitrose", from the remaining founders' names, was adopted. In 1937, the company, consisting of 10 shops and 160 employees, was taken over by the John Lewis Partnership. In 1944, the partnership purchased the South Essex grocery business Schofield and Martin, which had 12 shops in its chain.

In 1955, the chain opened its first Waitrose supermarket in Streatham, London, and continued to expand throughout London and the South East of England during the 1960s. In the 1970s, Waitrose opened branches in Hampshire, Bedfordshire, Essex and Cambridgeshire. In 2013, the chain's most northerly branch opened in Stirling, Scotland, and on 16 June 2016 the most southerly branch opened in Truro, Cornwall.

In the early 21st century, Waitrose continued its expansion, which included purchasing shops from Somerfield, Morrisons and Woolworths.

In 2009 the firm signed a deal with Alliance Boots which allowed Boots to operate branded pharmacies in Waitrose shops and Boots shops to sell Waitrose food products. The partnership between the companies ended in 2012 having been deemed unsuccessful, which led to Boots replacing Waitrose products with items from Irish retailer Musgrave's SuperValu chain.

Profitability issues at the end of the decade resulted in John Lewis announcing the closure of five Waitrose shops in 2018 and the sale of a further five Waitrose shops to other retailers in 2019.

== Brand and marketing ==
The logo of Waitrose prior to the re-brand in 2003

Waitrose logo from 2004 to 2018

Waitrose sponsored Reading Football Club from 2008 to 2015, and the England cricket team for three years from 2013 to 2016.

In March 2010, Waitrose released a series of adverts, in print, online, and on national television, featuring celebrity chefs Delia Smith and Heston Blumenthal.

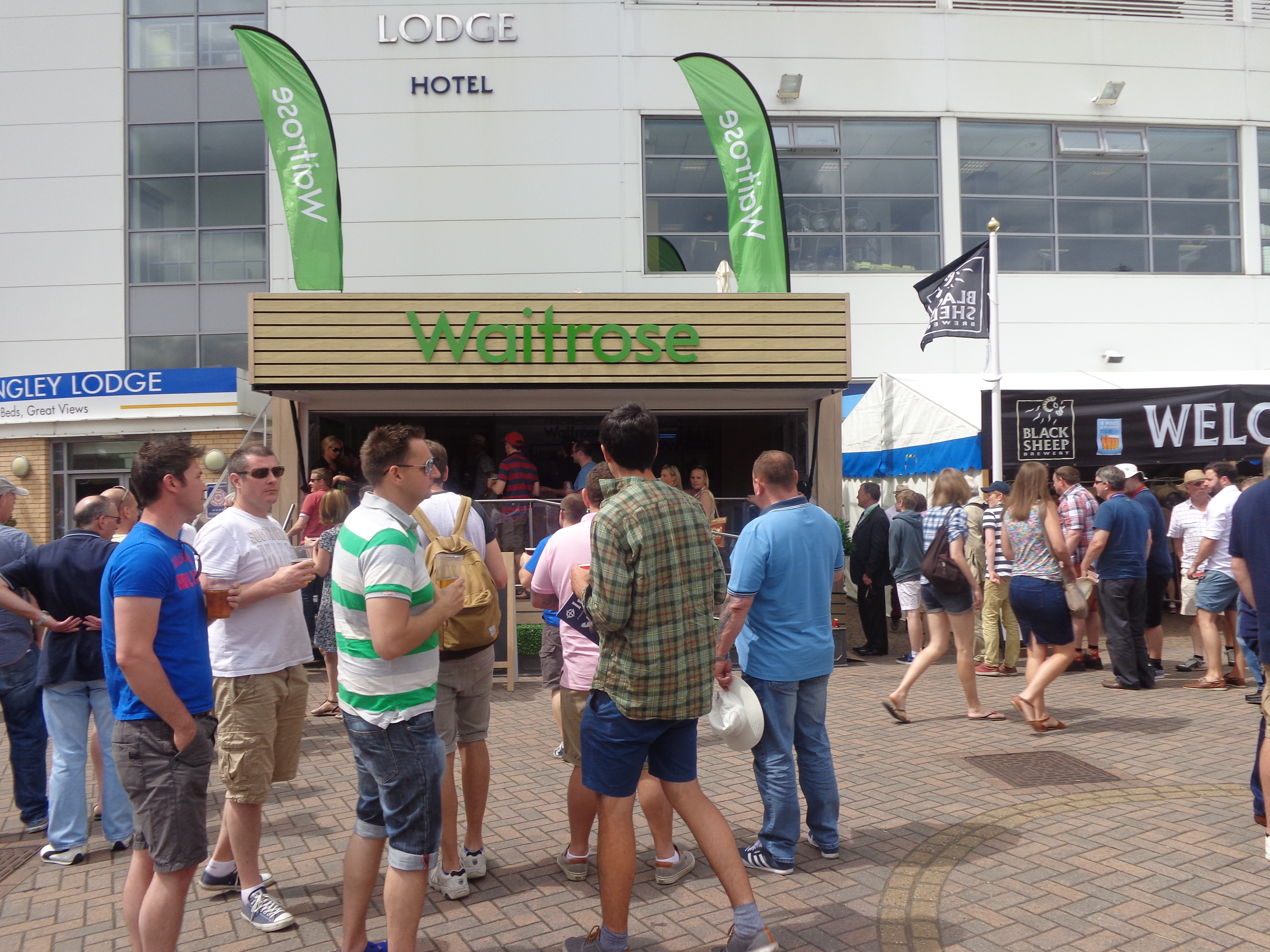
A Waitrose promotional stall at Headingley during a 2014 Test between England and Sri Lanka

=== Waitrose Duchy Organic ===
In 1983 Waitrose became the first major supermarket chain to sell organic food, and by 2008 it had an 18% share of the organic food market. In September 2009, Duchy Originals, the struggling organic food business started by King Charles III (then Prince Charles) was rescued by Waitrose, which agreed to an exclusive deal to stock the range, and to pay a small fee to his charity. In August 2010, the Duchy range was relaunched with many new lines under the Duchy Originals from Waitrose (later Waitrose Duchy Organic) brand.

=== Product ranges ===
- Essential Waitrose: Aware that Waitrose risked being seen as a food retailer for special occasions rather than everyday shopping, the chain launched its value range of products as Essential Waitrose in March 2009. The marketing used the tagline: "Quality you'd expect at prices you wouldn't". 1,400 products were branded with this name using simple white-based packaging. Some people poked fun at the range for selling products that are not essential, such as ratatouille provençal and limoncello desserts. Nevertheless, the range was highly successful. By 2016 it had more than 2,000 items and £1.1 billion annual sales, making it one of only five food and drink brands in Britain worth more than £1 billion.
- No 1 Waitrose is a range of around 650 premium lines with black packaging.
- Cooks' Ingredients are spices, herbs and related products with colourful packaging.
- Heston for Waitrose is a range of prepared foods such as pies and cakes developed with celebrity chef Heston Blumenthal.

=== myWaitrose loyalty card ===
In late 2011 the supermarket introduced its first loyalty card scheme, myWaitrose. It differed from supermarket loyalty schemes like Tesco Clubcard and Nectar, giving cardholders access to exclusive competitions and offers instead of allowing them to collect points.

It later began to give cardholders 10% off selected products, as well as free tea or coffee in store and money off their shopping for purchasing selected newspapers. Then-managing director Mark Price said that this offer has made Waitrose the second largest provider of coffee in the UK, calling it a "phenomenal" response that showed other schemes offering the different system of loyalty points to be meaningless. He told The Daily Telegraph: "Giving free coffee or free newspapers is disruptive to the market, but I think that is what customers want, I don't think they want a point. I mean, what is a point? I think it's meaningless. It doesn't have the richness, it doesn't have the affinity you can gauge if you engage with your customers in a different way. It is about what do consumers value today, not what did they value historically. So Green Shield stamps, or points, were a response to what happened post-war...I just don't think that is where the world is now."

The Daily Telegraph also later reported that Waitrose has faced "complaints from disgruntled middle-class shoppers who claim its free coffee offer is attracting the wrong kind of customer".

=== Price matching ===
In 2010, Waitrose began a price guarantee, matching prices of 1,000 items with Tesco. In 2012, it extended this campaign to 7,000 items.

=== Waitrose Kitchen magazine ===
In February 2015, Waitrose Kitchen magazine included an advertising pamphlet, "Taste of Israel", submitted by the Israeli government, in which traditional Arabic foods were referred to as Israeli. The advert prompted a social media backlash against Waitrose.

== Corporate practices ==
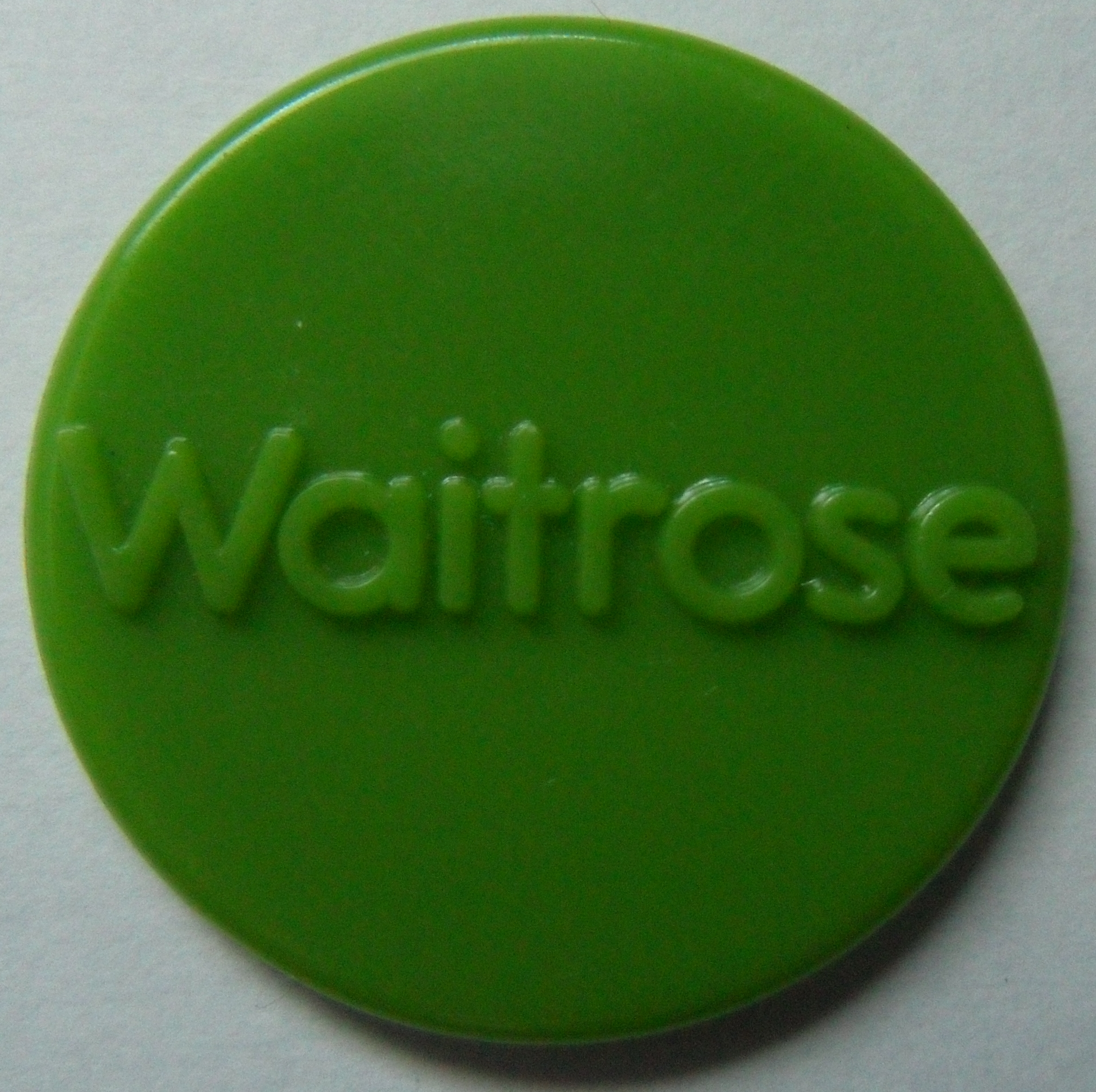
A Waitrose 'Community Matters' charity token

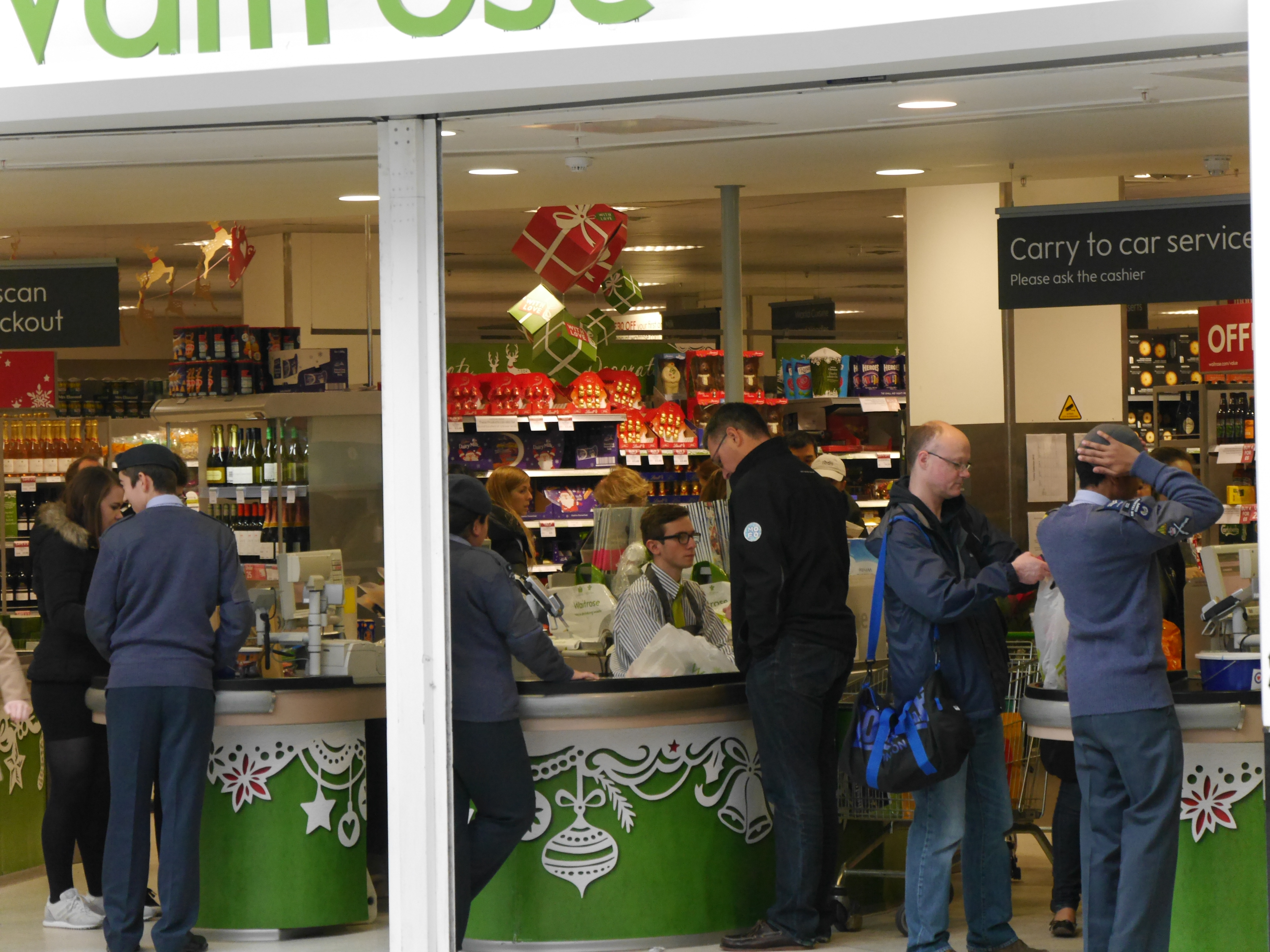
A Waitrose customer services partner serving a customer during the Christmas period at Putney

Waitrose and its related brands are owned by the John Lewis Partnership (JLP), which is itself owned by its "partners." "Employee" (partner) shares are held in trust by the partnership—their shares cannot be sold by the individual partners. The partners' economic rewards are achieved through the payment of bonuses, based on the JLP's annual profits. As such, they receive certain benefits, including the partnership bonus, usually around 10–20% of a partner's yearly salary in a lump sum paid in March. However, during the COVID-19 pandemic, the partnership bonus was suspended in both the 2020 and 2021 financial years, angering many partners as they felt their hard work was not recognised.

Waitrose donates a portion of its profits to a group of charities on a proportional basis, whilst individual Waitrose branches manage their own charitable donations and local decisions are made on which charities are to be supported. This is a system called Community Matters, where customers are invited to choose to whom they want money to be donated.

The supermarket launched the Waitrose Foundation in 2005, providing funds for education, worker facilities, and health services among other things for fruit growers in South Africa. This was expanded to Ghana and Kenya in 2009.

== Shops ==
Traditionally, Waitrose branches were largely concentrated in the south-east of England and Greater London; even as recently as 2003, its northernmost English branch was in Newark-on-Trent, Nottinghamshire. However, the company's expansion northwards and into Scotland since the mid-2000s has changed this significantly: the most northerly Waitrose shop, which opened in January 2013, is now located in Stirling. Waitrose opened its 300th shop in Helensburgh on the River Clyde on 23 October 2013.

Waitrose shops vary considerably in size. For example, the smallest branch, little Waitrose at King's Cross station, London, occupies only 2,500 sq ft (230 m^{2}) of retail space.

Some Waitrose shops incorporate an in-house restaurant selling hot and cold food sourced in the main from the shop. The myWaitrose card, which customers can obtain online, offers free hot drinks from the store's self-service machines with a purchase of goods; this was withdrawn owing to the COVID-19 pandemic but as of February 2023 the coffee offer has returned.

A new store was launched in Cricklewood, London, in October 2026, as part of a £1 billion investment by Waitrose to expand its number of stores and refurbish existing stores.

=== Convenience shops and little Waitrose ===
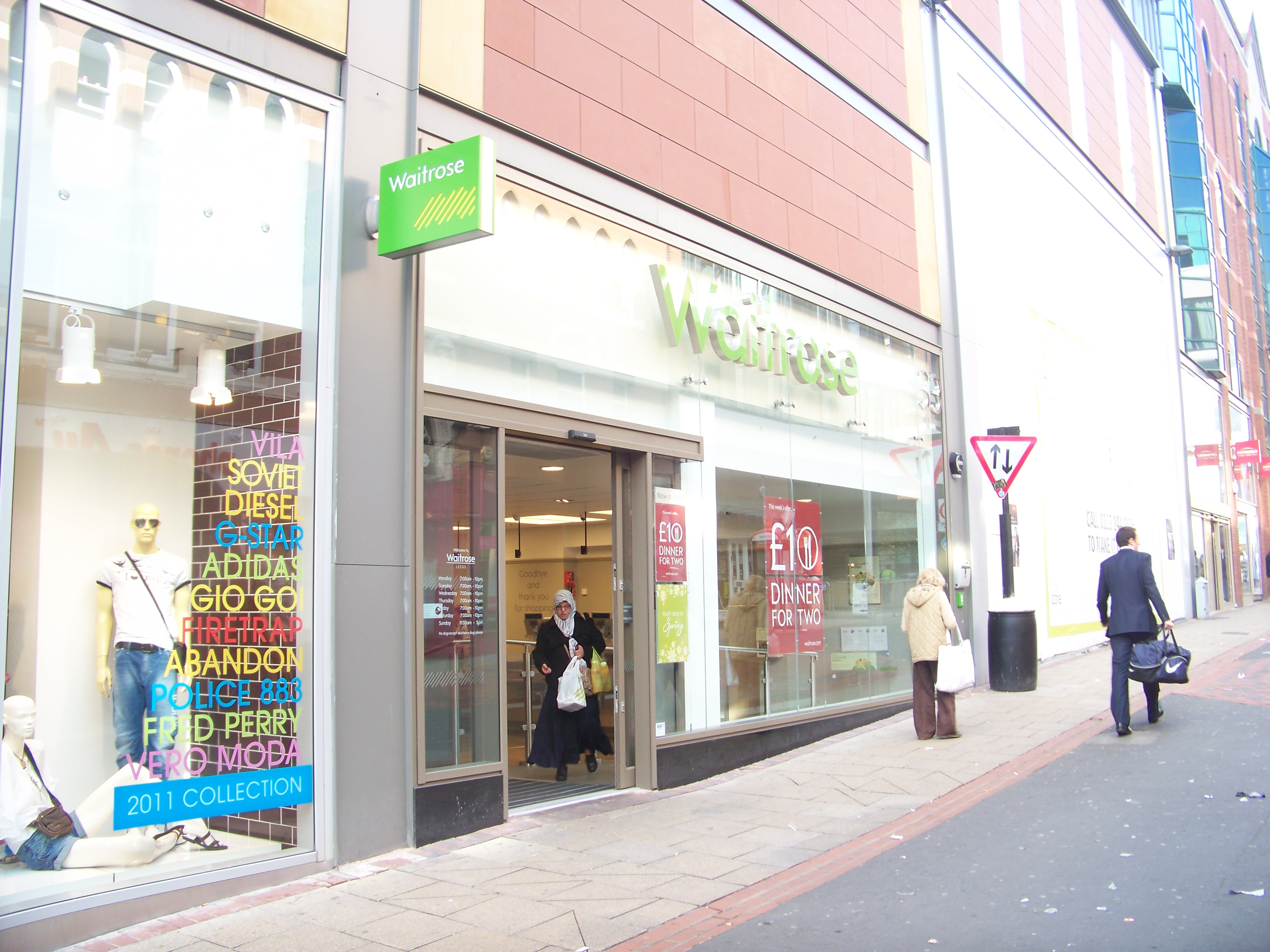
A Waitrose convenience shop on Lands Lane in Leeds city centre

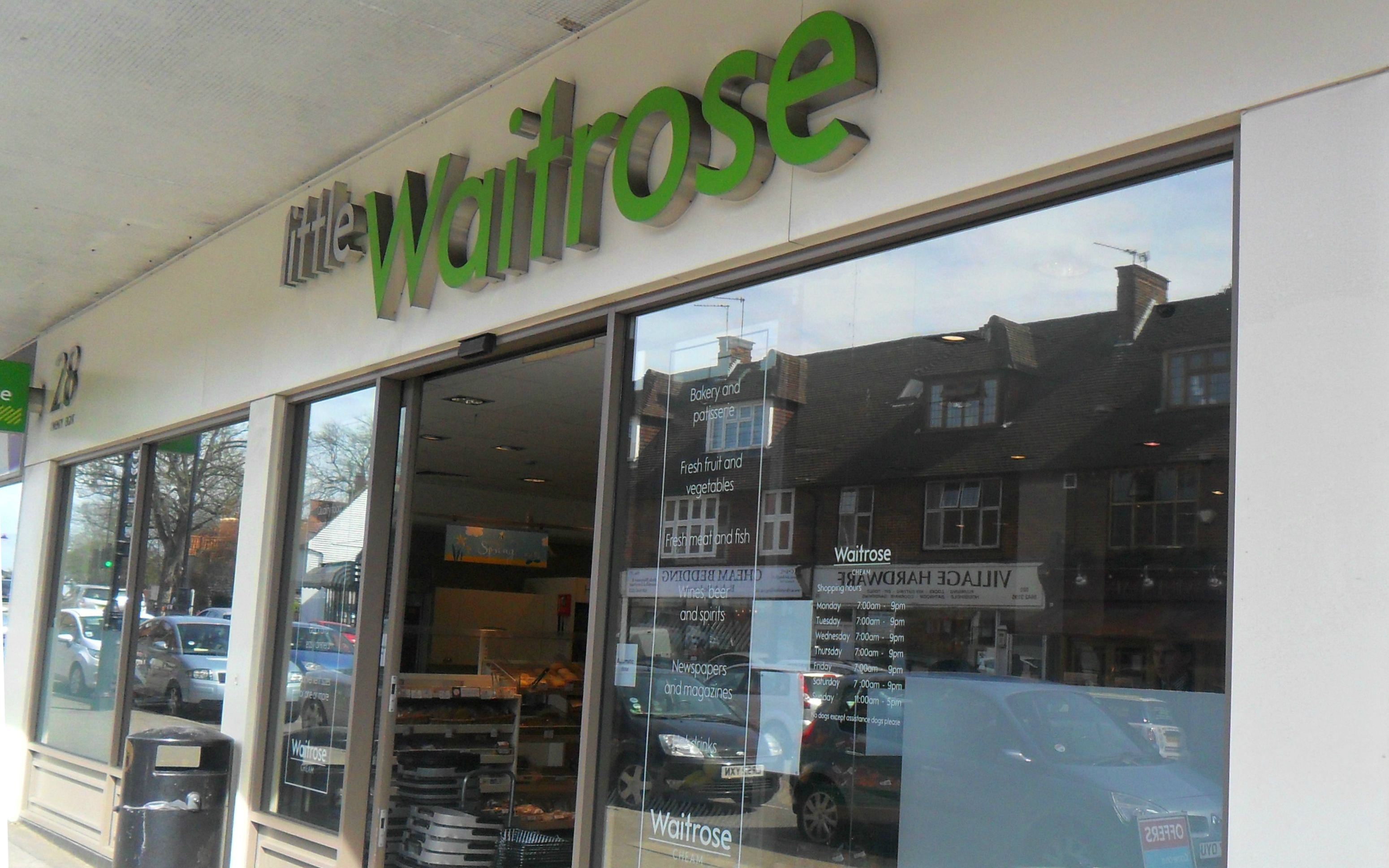
A little Waitrose shop in Cheam

Announcing its foray into the convenience sector in July 2008, Waitrose opened its first convenience shop in Nottingham in December of that year. In September 2009, it was announced that a large scale rollout of the concept was planned, opening up to 300 shops in 5 to 10 years. The new arm operates in a two-tier environment, with the majority of sites expected to trade from 2,500 to 3,000 square feet (230 to 280 square metres) and some trading from a larger 5,000 to 7,000 square feet (460 to 650 square metres) floor plate. A trial of a Little Waitrose fascia on smaller floor plate shops may yet lead to brand differentiation of some or all of the convenience estate.

Shell operates a series of Little Waitrose stores at selected petrol stations in the UK.

In August 2024, Waitrose announced plans to open 100 new convenience shops over the next five years.

=== Welcome Break ===
In May 2009, Waitrose started a franchise deal with the motorway service station operator Welcome Break.

=== Dobbies Garden Centres ===
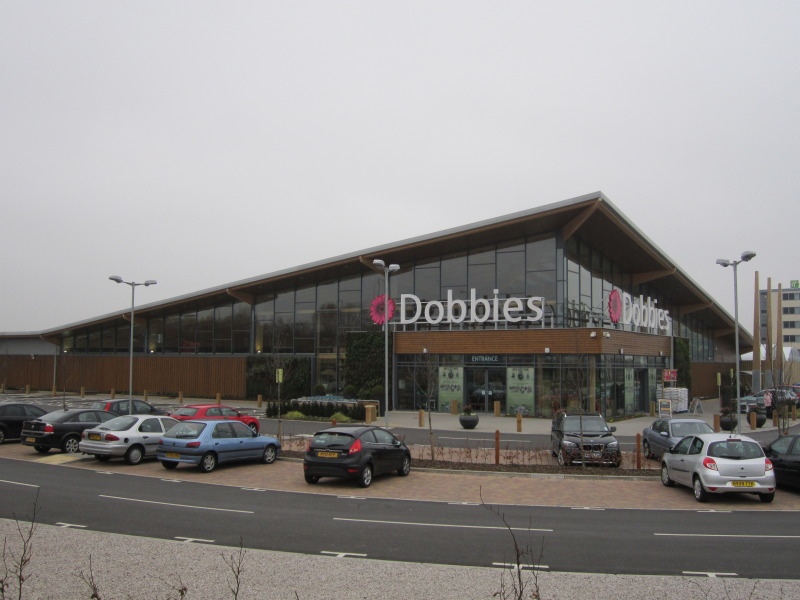
A Dobbies Garden Centre in Liverpool which incorporates Waitrose store

In July 2022, Waitrose entered into a deal with Dobbies Garden Centres to open approximately 50 Waitrose shop-in-shop branches by the end of 2023. These branches stock about 2,000 Waitrose products.

Due to the closure of a number of Dobbies branches, as of late 2024, there were approximately 47 branches of Waitrose inside Dobbies Garden Centres.

=== Closed / sold stores ===
Waitrose closed four convenience shops and one supermarket in the UK in 2018. This was followed by the announcement of 12 further store closures in 2019. In September 2020, a further four stores, Caldicot, Ipswich, Shrewsbury and Wolverhampton, were announced as closing, the last having been sold to Tesco.

=== 2014 ===
- Dartford, Kent

=== 2015 ===
- Littlehampton, West Sussex. Re-located to Rustington

=== 2016 ===
- Leeds City Centre, West Yorkshire
- Tottenham Court Road, London

=== 2017 ===
- Cardiff Queen Street
- Hertford, Hertfordshire
- Huntingdon, Cambridgeshire
- Leek, Staffordshire. Re-opened as Lidl
- Palmers Green, London. Re-located to Winchmore Hill
- Staines-upon-Thames, Surrey. Re-opened as M&S Foodhall

=== 2018 ===
- Spinningfields, Manchester. Reopened as a Co-op
- Manchester Piccadilly station. Reopened as a Co-op
- Colmore Row, Birmingham. Re-opened as Co-op 2019.
- Portman Square, London
- Camden Town, London

=== Spring 2019 ===
- Torquay. Re-opened as Lidl June 2020.
- Teignmouth. Re-opened as Lidl January 2020.
- Blaby, Leicestershire
- Barry, Vale of Glamorgan
- Ashbourne, Derbyshire

=== Autumn 2019 ===
- Bromley
- Oadby
- Wollaton. Re-opened as Lidl
- Sandhurst. Re-opened as Aldi
- Marlow, Buckinghamshire. Re-opened as Lidl.
- Stevenage
- Waterside building (British Airways headquarters)

=== Spring 2020 ===
- Four Oaks. Re-opened as Aldi.
- Helensburgh. Now a Morrisons
- Waterlooville

=== Autumn 2020 ===
- Wolverhampton. Originally operated by Safeway. Reopened as Tesco June 2021.
- Shrewsbury. Now a Greggs
- Caldicot, Monmouthshire
- Ipswich, Corn Exchange

=== 2022 ===
- Croydon, London
- Newcastle, Tyne & Wear

=== 2025 ===
- Hall Green Re-Opened as B&M

=== International ===
Waitrose holds a licensing agreement with Spinneys of Dubai, United Arab Emirates, which operates two purpose-built branches, of which the first opened in the Dubai Mall in October 2008. In the United Arab Emirates, it is an official grocery supplier to the royal family, the House of Maktoum.

== Online presence ==
=== Ocado ===
In April 2000, the online food retailer Ocado was launched, with the Ocado service being only available in certain areas of Britain. John Lewis Partnership came on board as a principal supplier and part-owner in October 2000, although the relationship between the two began formally in January 2002. Arrangements were amended in 2010 to a 10-year agreement to supply products to Ocado. In February 2011, John Lewis pension trust divested itself of its Ocado shares.

In August 2020, Waitrose announced it would cease supplies to Ocado, which ended on 1 September 2020. Ocado subsequently partnered with Waitrose's rival store Marks & Spencer.

=== Waitrose.com ===
Waitrose operates its own delivery service, Waitrose.com (previously WaitroseDeliver), which originally was only available in certain shops, delivering goods ordered through the internet and serviced from the local branch. As well as ordinary online groceries shopping, Waitrose.com also hosts the online ordering system for Waitrose's special order food and cakes service Waitrose Entertaining. Waitrose became the first supermarket to abolish all delivery charges as of May 2009.

In October 2011, Waitrose opened a Dotcom Fulfilment Centre in Acton, West London, less than two miles from its original shop. The shop employs more than 200 people and provides Waitrose internet food deliveries for most of west and central London from a dedicated site. The shop, whilst not open to the public, is laid out in a similar manner to a regular shop and even offers service counter lines, much like a normal Waitrose supermarket.

In March 2020, Waitrose announced that it was to add its Waitrose.com online delivery service to 24 more of its stores across the UK in preparation for its split with Ocado in September 2020.

== Animal welfare ==
In 2020, undercover footage was filmed on a farm in Yorkshire that supplied milk to Waitrose, Tesco, Sainsbury's and Ocado. The footage showed goats being extremely badly treated. Waitrose immediately suspended the farm's brand when the footage was released.

In 2022, Waitrose signed the Better Chicken Commitment (BCC), which calls for the more ethical treatment and slaughter of farmed chickens. They committed to fully meet BCC welfare standards by September 2025. In September 2025, Waitrose became the first supermarket to achieve the chicken welfare benchmark.

Since 2023, Waitrose has collaborated with its suppliers to trial electrical stunning as a more humane method of slaughter for farmed prawns, replacing traditional practices such as asphyxiation or immersion in ice slurry. In 2025, the company announced plans to implement electrical stunning across its entire supply chain for farmed prawns by the end of 2026, following discussions with the International Council for Animal Welfare (ICAW). Waitrose has also phased out the practice of shrimps eyestalk ablation within its supply chain.

In 2024, Waitrose was a signatory to a letter organised by Compassion in World Farming and signed by Aldi, the Co-op, M&S, Morrisons, and others which called on the UK government to ban the use of cages for egg-laying hens in the UK and in UK imports. Waitrose says that 100% of its eggs are free range.

== Awards and acclaims ==
Waitrose has received a number of awards. Its wines have been given awards by Decanter magazine and the International Wine and Spirit Competition. The supermarket chain has also received awards for its retail service, including from Which? magazine. Compassion in World Farming and the RSPCA have given Waitrose awards for animal welfare.

== In media and culture ==
In Charlie Higson's The Enemy series of post-apocalyptic novels, whose first book came out in 2009, the Waitrose of Holloway Road, London, is set as the main headquarters and a secure haven for the children who survived a pandemic that affected all adults.

In 2025, the Waitrose eponymous house magazine featured a guide by Ash Bhardwaj that follows around Oxford city the footsteps of Lyra Belacqua, the heroine of the Philip Pullman trilogy of His Dark Materials, in celebration of the 30th anniversary of Northern Lights that inaugurated the series.

== See also ==
- List of supermarket chains in the United Kingdom
- Publix, a similar employee-owned regional supermarket in the United States
