= Binary economics =

Theory of economics

Binary economics, also known as two-factor economics, is a proposed economics theory by Louis O. Kelso that suggests policy makers endorse a continued use of both private property and a free market but should also seek significant reforms to the banking system as a means of producing fairer economic growth.

Kelso principally theorized with this model that widespread use of central bank-issued, interest-free loans to fund employee-owned firms could simultaneously finance economic growth and widen ownership interests in company shares. In a 1977 seminar on Policies for Capital Diffusion through Expanded Equity Ownership, Lawrence Klein concluded expansion of credit under the plan would be non-inflationary "if the funds made available flow into investments that raise national productivity." The term "binary" in his case is derived from a perceived heterodox treatment of labor and capital (but not in the sense of binary opposition). Kelso claimed that with advancing technology capital becomes more important than physical labor and if income distribution is determined by market forces, owners will become richer while labor will find it more difficult to survive. He favored spreading capital ownership rather than redistributive policies.

== Overview ==
Rodney Shakespeare argues that all individuals can be economically productive, whereas conventional economics focuses on paying jobs.

According to Kelso's theory, prior financial savings are unnecessary for investment, as the existing money supply primarily consists of created credit. It argues that newly minted money invested on behalf of those without access to existing cash savings or collateral can be adequately repaid through the returns on those investments, which need not be inflationary if the economy is operating below capacity. Kelso's theory combines private property and free markets with interest-free credit to create "new capitalists" through broad capital distribution.

Shakespeare claims that bank lending always involves the creation of money as new interest-bearing debt.

== Background ==
The theory behind Binary Economics was proposed by American lawyer Louis Kelso and philosopher Mortimer Adler in their book The Capitalist Manifesto (1958). The authors compared their work to The Communist Manifesto.

Kelso and Adler elaborated on their proposals in The New Capitalists in 1961. Then Kelso worked with political scientist Patricia Hetter Kelso to further explain how capital instruments provide an increasing percentage of the wealth and why capital is narrowly owned in the modern industrial economy. Their analysis predicted that widely distributed capital ownership will create a more balanced economy. Kelso and Hetter proposed new "binary" shareholdings which would pay out full net earnings as dividends (with exceptions for research, maintenance and depreciation). These could be obtained on credit by those not possessing savings, with a government-backed insurance scheme to protect the shareholder in the event of loss.

== Academic reception and criticism ==
Binary economics is foundationally distinct from mainstream economics and has been widely rejected by mainstream economists.

=== Academic criticism ===
Milton Friedman dismissed The Capitalist Manifesto, stating "the book's economics was bad ... the interpretation of history, ludicrous; and the policy recommended, dangerous." He recalled a debate where the moderator Clark Kerr "lost his cool as a moderator and attacked [Kelso's arguments] vigorously". Paul Samuelson, another Nobel Memorial Prize in Economic Sciences winner, told the U.S. Congress that Kelso's theories were a "cranky fad" not accepted by mainstream economists.

=== Theoretical objections ===
Productivity analysis: Kelso's claim that capital contributes 90% of productive output and labor only 10% has been dismissed by economists for lacking empirical evidence. Samuelson asserted that Kelso had not used any econometric analysis to arrive at his figures, which completely contradicted economists' empirical findings on the contribution of labor. The Capitalist Manifesto did not provide detailed calculations to support Kelso's claim, although a footnote suggested that it was based on a simple comparison with 1850s labor productivity figures.

Monetary theory: The proposal for large-scale interest-free lending conflicts with established monetary theory and the widely accepted time value of money principle. Mainstream economists argue interest rates are a useful indicator of risk and opportunity costs.

=== Academic standing ===
Binary economics is not taught in standard economics curricula and has not generated significant research in mainstream academic journals. The post-autistic approach to education calls for including binary economics and others outside the neo-classical macro-economic focus.

== Beliefs and aims ==
The aim of binary economics is to ensure that all individuals receive income from their own independent capital estate, using interest-free loans issued by a central bank to promote the spread of employee-owned firms. According to Shakespeare, these loans are intended to: halve infrastructure improvement costs, reduce business startup costs, and widen ownership interests in company shares.

Ashford evaluated that Kelso's paradigm is not mainstream and does not fit easily into the left–right spectrum. Kelso listed two factors of production in binary economics: labour and capital (which includes land, structures, machines, and intangibles).

Robert Ashford cautions that binary financing might need to be restricted to economic basics such as food, clothing, shelter, healthcare, and energy, along with ecological restrictions.

Kelso rejects what he terms socialist solutions of expropriation or redistribution. James Albus proposes mandatory savings withholding to fight inflation.

== Productiveness vs. productivity ==
Binary productiveness is distinctly different from the conventional economic concept of productivity. Binary productiveness attempts to quantify the proportion of output contributed by total labor input and total capital input respectively, Adding capital inputs to a production process increases labor productivity, but according to Kelso's framework it decreases labor productiveness (i.e. the proportion of the total output with the support of both labor and capital that the labor inputs could have produced alone). For example, if the invention of a shovel allows a laborer to dig a hole in quarter of the time it would take him without the spade, Kelso would consider 75% of the "productiveness" to come from the shovel and only 25% from the laborer.

Roth criticised the shovel example on the basis that the shovel is not a factor of production independent of human capital because somebody invented it, and the shovel cannot act independently: the physical productiveness of the shovel before labour is added to it is zero. However binary economists didn't claim that capital acted independently of labor. They point out that it greatly increased output and so should be considered a factor in its own right. That is: its output contribution should be assessed independently, not that it operated independently of labor. Two different things entirely that Roth somehow missed. The inventor of the shovel is of course lost to history, the unpatented labor value there belonging to all, something social credit founder C. H. Douglas termed 'a cultural heritage'.

Early economists such as Ricardo and Smith had capital as a subset of the Labor Theory of Value as in their time most work was labor intensive, with only about 5% of the Agricultural Age economy based on capital, outside of land. Karl Marx copied the Labor Theory of Value, even though by his time, the Industrial Age had advanced to the point that a steam thresher was featured at the Paris World's Fair that could do the work of 30 to 40 laborers in the same year Marx's Das Kapital was published. Futurist and bestseller Alvin Toffler uses this 1867 Paris Exposition example repeatedly in interviews and later writings (e.g., Powershift, Revolutionary Wealth) as a symbol of how one capital instrument can suddenly displace the labor of dozens or hundreds of people—an idea Kelso and binary economists cite to show why labor-alone incomes become structurally inadequate in advanced economies. AI and robotics promises to increase the capital component of production even more.

Kelso used the concept of productiveness to support his theory of distributive justice, arguing that as capital increasingly substitutes for labor: "workers can legitimately claim from their aggregate labor only a decreasing percentage of total output", implying they would need to acquire capital holdings to maintain their level of income. In The Capitalist Manifesto, Kelso boldly asserted:

"It is, if anything an underestimation rather than an exaggeration to say that the aggregate physical contribution to the production of the wealth of the workers in the United States today accounts for less than 10 percent of the wealth produced, and that the contribution by the owners of capital instruments, through their physical instruments, accounts in physical terms for more than 90 percent of the wealth produced"

— Louis Kelso, The Capitalist Manifesto (1958)

Kelso criticizes Marx for not recognizing capital as a producer of wealth in the same sense as labor. Kelso's figures suggesting that value was created almost entirely by capital were dismissed by academic economists like Paul Samuelson.

== Employee stock ownership plan (ESOPs) ==
Shakespeare proposes extending employee stock ownership plan principles to the whole population with binary economics. In the 2000s about 11,500 ESOPs in the USA covered 10 million employees. Binary economists invented the ESOP and lobbied to have it become law.

== Uses of central bank-issued interest-free loans ==
Rodney Shakespeare proposes healthier forms of money and income distribution. He proposes a gradual rise to 100% reserve requirements and relating the overall money supply to gold.

=== Investments eligible for interest-free loans ===
Kelso suggests that ownership of productive (and the associated consuming) capacity, particularly new capacity, could be spread by the use of central bank-issued interest-free loans. Shakespeare proposes the full payout of earnings by large corporations.

== Sources ==
- Albus, James S. (1976) Peoples' Capitalism - The Economics of The Robot Revolution.
- Ashford, Robert & Shakespeare, Rodney (1999) Binary Economics - the new paradigm.
- Ashford, Robert "Louis Kelso's Binary Economy" (The Journal of Socio-Economics, vol. 25, 1996).
- el-Diwany, Tarek (2003) The Problem With Interest.
- Gates, Jeff (1999) The Ownership Solution.
- Gates, Jeff (2000) Democracy At Risk.
- Gauche, Jerry "Binary Modes for the Privatization of Public Assets" (The Journal of Socio-Economics. Vol. 27, 1998).
- Greenfield, Sidney M. Making Another World Possible: the Torah, Louis Kelso and the Problem of Poverty (paper given at conference, Columbia University, May, 2006).
- Kelso, Louis & Kelso, Patricia Hetter (1986 & 1991), Democracy and Economic Power - Extending the ESOP Revolution through Binary Economics.
- Kelso, Louis & Adler, Mortimer (1958), The Capitalist Manifesto.
- Kelso, Louis & Adler, Mortimer (1961), The New Capitalists.
- Kelso, Louis & Hetter, Patricia (1967), Two-Factor Theory: the Economics of Reality.
- Kurland, Norman A New Look at Prices and Money: The Kelsonian Binary Model for Achieving Rapid Growth Without Inflation.
- Kurland, Norman; Brohawn, Dawn & Michael Greaney (2004) Capital Homesteading for Every Citizen: A Just Free Market Solution for Saving Social Security.
- Miller, J.H. ed., (1994), Curing World Poverty: The New Role of Property.
- Reiners, Mark Douglas, The Binary Alternative and Future of Capitalism.
- Schmid, A. Allan,(1984), "Broadening Capital Ownership: The Credit System as a Focus of Power", in Gar Alperovitz and Roger Skurski, eds. American Economic Policy, University of Notre Dame Press.
- Shakespeare, Rodney & Challen, Peter (2002) Seven Steps to Justice.
- Shakespeare, Rodney (2007) The Modern Universal Paradigm.
- Turnbull, Shann (2001) The Use of Central Banks to Spread Ownership.
- Turnbull, Shann (1975/2000), Democratising the Wealth of Nations.
