= Employee share schemes in the United Kingdom =

Employee share schemes are part of the remuneration packages offered to some employees in the United Kingdom.

== History ==
ESOPs became widespread for a short period in the UK under the government of Margaret Thatcher, particularly following the Transport Act 1985, which deregulated and then privatised bus services. Councils seeking to protect workers ensured that employees accessed shares as privatisation took place, but employee owners soon lost their shares as they were bought up and bus companies were taken over. The disappearance of stock plans was dramatic.

The John Lewis Partnership has been cited as an example of an employee share ownership. However, unlike some other employee ownership arrangements, partners in John Lewis have no proprietary right to their stake and cannot buy or sell their rights or collectively dissolve the entity. ESOPs are almost entirely opposite because at John Lewis, employees get a voice at work but cannot trade an ownership stake; an ESOP typically carries no meaningful voice but allows the interest to be bought and sold.

In July 2012, the Department for Business Innovation and Skills published a report, "The Employee Ownership Advantage, Benefits and Consequences". This report listed several major advantages of employee ownership including stronger longterm focus, increased employee representation at the board level and greater preference for internal growth. The report also highlighted that employee owned businesses face greater problems when it comes to raising capital and dealing with regulatory requirements. The study was based on data from a survey of 41 employee-owned businesses and 22 non-employee owned businesses in the United Kingdom, and also draws upon the published financial data of 49 EOBs and 204 non-EOBs in the UK.

The Chancellor of the Exchequer George Osborne announced in a speech at the Conservative Party Conference on 8 October 2012 that the law would be reformed to create a new employment status for "employee-owners". Employee-owners will pay no capital gains tax on any profit made from selling these shares. Still, they will have to give up certain employment rights in return, including redundancy and unfair dismissal. The consultation by the Department for Business, Innovation and Skills was published on 18 October 2012. Lawyers have suggested that the employee-owner scheme could have significant unintended consequences as, under the existing proposal, it may be possible for entrepreneurs to set themselves up as employee owners in order to avoid capital gains tax. In practice, those entrepreneurs will be far more 'owner' than 'employee' and the employment rights they will be giving up are likely to be of much less value to them than to ordinary employees and so the tax advantages would be of far greater value to them than to ordinary employees.

On 3 December 2012, the government published its response to the consultation. It had decided to press ahead with the changes despite 92% of responses to the consultation being either "negative" or "mixed" and despite it being "widely derided both in the House of Lords and in business chambers across the country". The term "employee owner" was dropped in favour of the more accurate "employee shareholder". Lawyers have commented that uncertainty remains as to how these proposals will operate in practice.

In April 2013, the Enterprise and Regulatory Reform Bill was passed and received Royal Assent. Implementation of the employee-shareholder provisions was expected to take place in October 2013. The employee ownership provisions received significant amendment in the House of Lords, with the unintended consequence possibly being that trade unions may now benefit.

At the end of June 2013, it emerged that just four companies had enquired about the shares-for-rights scheme, while only two had gone the further step of asking for information about it; the chancellor had been expecting thousands of firms to actually sign up.

In 2024, Vestd published a study which found that in the UK, men are twice as likely as women to be part of a company share scheme.

== Types ==
Several types of tax advantaged schemes exist:

- Sharesave
- Share Incentive Plan
- Company Share Option Plan
- Enterprise Management Incentives (EMIs)
- Employee shareholder shares

== See also ==
- Employee stock ownership
- UK company law
- UK labour law
