= Center on Business and Poverty =

- Founded: 2004
- Region served: Worldwide
- Key people: John Hoffmire (director)
- Website: cobap.org

Center on Business and Poverty (COBAP) is a non-profit organization that supports writing and community projects related to employers which participate in social enterprise or employee ownership. While it was an initiative of The College of Letters & Science at the University of Wisconsin Madison, it is now a private non-profit organization. John Hoffmire, who holds the Carmen Porco Chair in Sustainable Business at the Center on Business and Poverty, founded the organization in 2004 and serves as the current director. By arranging projects through employers, the program helps low-income individuals and families to improve their financial situations through various means.

== History ==
The idea for COBAP emerged during conversations between John Hoffmire and John Karl Scholz who knew each other from graduate school at Stanford University. Hoffmire started working on setting the groundwork for the center in 2004 and established a national advisory board. The original idea was to use trained volunteers from the university to counsel workers on financial matters. The program started as a way for UW Hospital employees to have their taxes done for free, but branched out to other businesses when demand increased.

== Work ==
COBAP supports writing and community projects related to employers which participate in social enterprise or employee ownership. The organization has developed several community projects to enroll employees in programs such as the Earned Income Tax Credit, direct-deposit banking and company-matched retirement plans. The service is available to those who earn less than $56,844, depending on the number of children in a family, and is offered at several businesses, credit unions and universities.

COBAP has also helped launch/or grow 45 businesses, and assisted in the creation of financial literacy training programs for over 160 credit unions. As of 2011, the organization through its volunteers had helped more than 21,000 low-income people complete their tax forms for free or for reduced fees.

The Center on Business and Poverty has helped to grow a sister organization: The Personal Finance Employee Education Fund (PFEEF). PFEEF promotes financial wellness through employers and sponsors the Personal Financial Wellness Scale and Survey.

== Funding ==
The organization raises funds through individual and corporate donations and foundation grants. It was started on seed money of $89,000. Some of its current and recent partners have included Puelicher Center for Banking Education, UW Credit Union, in conjunction with Beta Alpha Psi at UW-Madison, Journey House, Housing Ministries of American Baptists, Zions Bank, Precision Information, Wisconsin Institute for Public Policy and Service, and Staples, Inc.
