= The Capitalist Manifesto =

The Capitalist Manifesto may refer to:

- The Capitalist Manifesto (Kelso and Adler book), a 1958 book by Louis O. Kelso and Mortimer J. Adler
- Capitalist Manifesto, a 2021 book by Robert Kiyosaki
- The Capitalist Manifesto: Why the Global Free Market Will Save the World, a 2023 book by Johan Norberg
