= Public service mutual =

Type of public service organisation

In England, a public service mutual is an organisation that has left the public sector but continues delivering public services. There is a significant degree of employee ownership, influence or control in the way the organisation is run. CSH Surrey was the first public service mutual to be created out of the NHS in 2006. There are now over 100 public service mutuals across England, delivering public services across a wide range of sectors.
