= Share incentive plan =

Share incentive plans (SIPs) are employment-related stock grant and stock purchase programs in the United Kingdom. They were first introduced in 2000. SIPs are a HMRC (His Majesty's Revenue & Customs) approved, tax efficient all-employee benefit. Before 6 April 2014, HMRC approval was required for a SIP to obtain tax benefits. Since then, an employer is required to self-certify that the SIP meets the requirements of the relevant legislation. Accordingly, from 6 April 2014, a SIP may no longer be referred to as an HMRC-approved plan.

As of February 2020, SIPs are one of four employee share schemes in the UK, alongside share option plans (CSOPs), enterprise management incentives (EMIs), and savings-related share option schemes (SAYE).

There are four main elements to the SIP from which companies can choose to use one or more of the following: Free Shares, Partnership Shares, Matching Shares, Dividend Shares.

== Free shares ==
Companies can give up to £3,600 of free shares to employees in each tax year (from 6 April 2014). A participating employee can only take their Free Shares out of the SIP in the 3-year period from the date of award if they leave the company. Income Tax and National Insurance may be payable on the market value of the shares at the date of removal, unless they leave due to injury or disability, redundancy, if the company or part of the business they work for is sold out of the group, retirement, or death.

If Free Shares are removed between 3 and 5 years from the date of award, then Income Tax and National Insurance will be due on the lower value of the Free Shares at the date of award and their market value on the date on which they are withdrawn from the SIP.

If the Free Shares remain in the SIP for more than 5 years, there will be no Income Tax or National Insurance liability when the shares are removed from the SIP. In certain circumstances, prescribed by HMRC, there will be no Income Tax or National Insurance liability when the employee leaves the company, no matter how long the shares have been held in the plan.

== Partnership shares ==
Employees can use their pre-tax salary to buy shares up to a maximum of £1,800 or 10% of salary (whichever is the lower) each year. Partnership Shares will be free of Income Tax and National Insurance at the date of purchase.

If an employee takes their Partnership Shares out of the SIP within 3 years of the date of purchase, Income Tax and National Insurance will be payable on the market value of the shares at the date of removal.

If the Partnership Shares are removed between 3 and 5 years from the date of purchase, then Income Tax and National Insurance will be due on the lower of the value of the Partnership Shares at the date of award and their market value on the date on which they are withdrawn from the SIP.

If the Partnership Shares remain in the SIP for more than 5 years no Income Tax or National Insurance is payable when the shares are eventually removed from the SIP.

The purchase of Partnership Shares can be funded in 2 ways; either a single lump sum contribution once a year; or monthly contributions (subject to a maximum of £125 per month or 10% of salary (£150 per month from 6 April 2014), whichever is the lower, and a minimum of £10 per month). If the employee opts to make a lump sum contribution, the Partnership Shares must be purchased within 30 days of the deduction from salary.

Contributions from salary can be accumulated for a period of up to 12 months. Partnership Shares must be purchased within 30 days of the end of the accumulation period; or contributions from monthly salary can be used to buy Partnership Shares within 30 days of the deduction.

== Matching shares ==
The company can give employees up to 2 Matching Shares for each Partnership Share they buy. These shares will be free of Income Tax and National Insurance at the date of award. An employee can normally only take their Matching Shares out of the SIP in the 3-year period from the date of award if they leave the company. Income Tax and National Insurance will be payable on the market value of the shares at the date of removal. If the Matching Shares are removed between 3 and 5 years from the date of purchase, then Income Tax and National Insurance will be due on the lower of the value of the Matching Shares at the date of award and their market value on the date on which they are withdrawn from the SIP. If the Matching Shares remain in the SIP for more than 5 years no Income Tax or National Insurance is payable when the shares are eventually removed from the SIP. In certain circumstances, prescribed by HMRC, there can be no Income Tax or National Insurance liability when the employee leaves the company, no matter how long the shares have been held in the plan.

== Dividend shares ==
Dividends paid on SIP shares can be re-invested in further shares known as Dividend Shares. Before 6 April 2013, the maximum amount of dividend reinvestment was £1,500 per participant in a tax year. From 6 April 2013, the statutory reinvestment limit ceased to apply, however employers may continue to specify a limit if they choose. These shares are free of Income Tax and National Insurance at the date of purchase. An employee can only take their Dividend Shares out of the SIP in the 3-year period from the date of award if they leave the company. Dividend Shares are subject to a 3-year holding period. If the shares are removed after 3 years from the date of award there is no Income Tax or National Insurance liability. In certain circumstances, prescribed by HMRC, there can be no Income Tax or National Insurance liability when the employee leaves the company, no matter how long the shares have been held in the plan.

== Benefits of a SIP ==
For the employee SIPs provide the opportunity to invest pre-tax salary in the company they work for and become a share holder. By participating in a company's SIP an employee is able to share in the future success of the company. Research has also shown that a satisfied and incentivised workforce is more productive than an unsatisfied or non-incentivised workforce.

For the company a SIP provides a number of advantages. Employees with a vested interest in the success and performance of a company are more motivated to work as their investment is based upon the performance of the company. SIP's are also an extremely effective tool for staff retention within a company as participants are only liable to pay tax on shares acquired in the last 5 years and will only be eligible for Matching shares if they stay with the company for 3 years after the purchase of Partnership shares. Increasing employee retention in this way results in less expenditure for the company on overheads such as recruitment and the training of new recruits.

Companies running a SIP are also able to take advantage of Corporation tax relief for a variety of reasons including amongst others, the costs incurred putting the scheme in place & subsequent running costs including funding for maintenance of a trust.

== See also ==
- Employee stock ownership plan
- Long-term incentive plan
- Profit sharing
- Sharesave
