= Alexander Pepper =

British management scholar (born 1958)

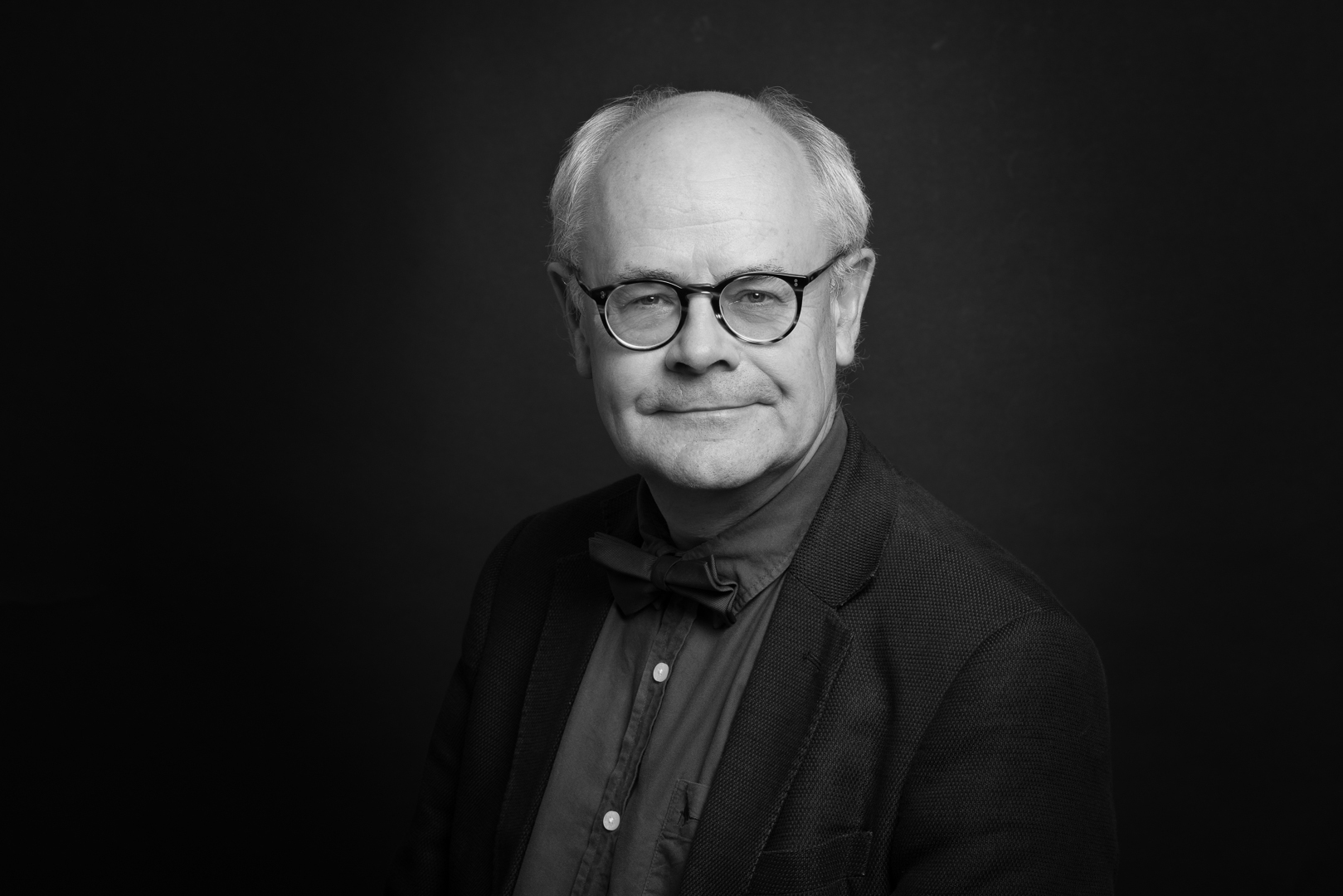
- Born: 1958 (age 67–68)
- Education: Durham University; University of Surrey
- Occupations: Professor, writer

Alexander (Sandy) Pepper (born 1958) is a management scholar, academic and emeritus professor of Management Practice at the London School of Economics and Political Science (LSE). His research focuses on senior executive pay, corporate governance, behavioural economics, and the theory of the firm. He is known for his book If You’re So Ethical, Why Are You So Highly Paid? Ethics, Inequality and Executive Pay. Currently he is a chair of Governing Body at the University of Portsmouth.

== Education and career ==
Pepper studied at Durham University before qualifying as an accountant with Coopers & Lybrand. He later undertook further study at Oxford University and HEC Paris and completed his Doctorate in Business Administration at the University of Surrey.

Pepper worked for PwC for 27 years, eventually becoming Joint Global Leader of the firm's Human Resource Services consulting practice. He joined the London School of Economics in 2008, where he taught and conducted research until his retirement in 2023. Following his retirement, he was appointed emeritus Professor of Management Practice at LSE. He also serves as Chair of the Governing Body at the University of Portsmouth.

== Research and contributions ==
Pepper's research focuses on organizations and management theory, with central interests in the theory of the firm, corporate governance, business ethics, and the determinants and consequences of executive pay.

A major contribution is his development of behavioural agency theory (BAT), formulated as both a critique and an extension of classical agency theory. Traditional agency theory (Jensen & Meckling, 1976) assumes rational, utility-maximizing, risk-averse agents, Pepper argues that these assumptions fail to account for how individuals actually behave in organisational contexts.

In his later research, Pepper applies concepts from institutional sociology to explain the persistent escalation of executive pay. Drawing on the framework of isomorphism, he argues that pay inflation is not merely the result of individual board decisions but emerges from broader systemic pressures. Together, these mechanisms create what Pepper describes as a “market failure” in executive pay: a self-reinforcing arms race in which each firm attempts to match or exceed others, driving compensation levels steadily upward.

== Selected publications ==
=== Books ===
- Pepper, Alexander (2015), "New Design Principles for Executive Pay", The Economic Psychology of Incentives, London: Palgrave Macmillan UK, pp. 129–143, ISBN 978-1-349-68142-6
- Pepper, Alexander (2018-11-20), "Agency Costs, Coordination Problems, and the Remuneration Committee's Dilemma", Agency Theory and Executive Pay, Cham: Springer International Publishing, pp. 1–14, ISBN 978-3-319-99968-5
- Pepper, Alexander (2022). If You're So Ethical, Why Are You So Highly Paid? Ethics, Inequality and Executive Pay. LSE Press. ISBN 978-1-909890-94-7.
- What's a Company For? A Problem in Business Ethics (or...when Socrates met Milton Friedman). LSE Press. 2026.
- Sallai, Dorottya; Pepper, Alexander; Open Textbook Library, eds. (2025). Navigating the 21st Century Business World. Open textbook library. London, England: LSE Press. ISBN 978-1-911712-39-8.

=== Articles ===
- Pepper, Alexander; Gore, Julie (2014). "The economic psychology of incentives: An international study of top managers". Journal of World Business. 49 (3): 350–361. doi:10.1016/j.jwb.2013.07.002. ISSN 1090-9516.
- Pepper, Alexander; Gore, Julie (2012-09-27). "Behavioral Agency Theory". Journal of Management. 41 (4): 1045–1068. doi:10.1177/0149206312461054. ISSN 0149-2063.
- Pepper, Alexander; Gosling, Tom; Gore, Julie (2015-03-17). "Fairness, envy, guilt and greed: Building equity considerations into agency theory". Human Relations. 68 (8): 1291–1314. doi:10.1177/0018726714554663. ISSN 0018-7267.
- Willman, Paul; Pepper, Alexander (2020-10-01). "The role played by large firms in generating income inequality: UK FTSE 100 pay practices in the late twentieth and early twenty-first centuries". Economy and Society. 49 (4): 516–539. doi:10.1080/03085147.2020.1774259. ISSN 0308-5147.
- Burri, Susanne; Lup, Daniela; Pepper, Alexander (2020-09-29). "What Do Business Executives Think About Distributive Justice?". Journal of Business Ethics. 174 (1): 15–33. doi:10.1007/s10551-020-04627-w. ISSN 0167-4544.
- Pepper, Alexander (2024-12-04). "CEO pay in the United Kingdom, 1968–2022". Business History: 1–22. doi:10.1080/00076791.2024.2430724. ISSN 0007-6791.
