= Sharesave =

Sharesave, also known as Save As You Earn, SAYE, or the Savings Related Share Option Scheme, is a British savings scheme designed to encourage employees to buy stakes in the companies for which they work. It was introduced by the British government in 1980, with HM Revenue & Customs approval, according to a model set by the Treasury. From 6 April 2014, HMRC approval will no longer be required for a SAYE plan to obtain tax benefits, instead an employer is required to self-certify that the SAYE meets the requirements of the relevant legislation. Accordingly, from 6 April 2014, a SAYE plan should no longer be referred to as an HMRC approved plan.

== Mechanism ==
Under Sharesave, a company offers its employees the right (known as the option) to buy shares in the company at a future date. The option may be granted at a discount of up to 20% of the current share price. The employee then chooses to save between £5 and £500 per month out of their net pay over a three or five-year term.

=== Maturation ===
When the contract matures, a tax-free bonus is received. The employee can then choose either to exercise the option to buy the shares with the proceeds from the savings contract, or to take the proceeds and the bonus. The bonuses are equivalent to fixed rate interest and are set by the Treasury. The savings and bonus are free from income tax. However, an employee may have to pay Capital Gains Tax (CGT) if they sell their shares and make a profit, which takes them above the CGT exemption limit for that year. An employee can transfer shares from the exercise of the option into a stocks and shares ISA, within 90 days of exercising the option. Capital gains made on these shares are then tax-free. There is a limit on the value of shares that can be transferred, and the ISA manager must agree to take them.

=== Conditions ===
Companies must offer sharesave schemes to all employees who meet the eligibility criteria, which often includes a requirement to remain in employment for at least 5 years.

=== Providers ===
Sharesave schemes are operated for companies by banks, building societies, or European Authorised Institutions which must first be authorised by the Treasury to operate. Global Shares, Computershare, Optio Incentives and Barclays are some of the domestic providers.

== Reception of the scheme ==
The Confederation of British Industry (CBI) and major political parties have acknowledged the benefits of employee shared ownership. These benefits include an increased employee awareness of the effect of their actions on a company's success; enhanced relationships between employees and management; tax-free savings advantages for employees; expanded share-holder bases for companies; and increased employee motivation and enhanced performance.

== See also ==
- Employee stock ownership plan
- Employee stock option
- Share Incentive Plan
- LTIP
- Profit Sharing
