= Wisconsin Institute for Public Policy and Service =

US research institute

- Formation: 2007; 19 years ago
- Type: Research institute
- Headquarters: 625 Stewart Avenue
- Location: Wausau, Wisconsin
- Director: Eric Giordano
- Website: wipps.org

The Wisconsin Institute for Public Policy and Service (WIPPS) is a nonpartisan research institute of the University of Wisconsin System founded in 2007 at the University of Wisconsin-Marathon County (now the University of Wisconsin–Stevens Point at Wausau). The organization conducts research on a variety of policy-related issues and holds events to present various research projects and community dialogues on a number of different issues.

== Programs ==
Manny WIPPS programs and projects take the form of short-term lectures or community dialogues. There are, however, several programs that run every year.

The Washington Seminar is a study-away course for college students in Madison, Wisconsin and Washington, D.C. Students in the program earn college credit and participate in three weeks of meetings with elected officials and others involved in policy at the state and national levels.

The Veninga Lecture on Religion & Society is an annual lecture in which WIPPS brings in a national speaker on religious issues.

The Toward One Wisconsin inclusivity conference is a statewide conference on equity, diversity, and inclusion. The conference brings together people from many different sectors throughout the state to address these issues.
