= The Capitalist Manifesto (Kelso and Adler book) =

1958 book by Louis O. Kelso and Mortimer J. Adler

- Cover of the first edition
- Authors: Louis O. Kelso; Mortimer J. Adler
- Language: English
- Subject: Capitalism
- Publisher: Random House
- Publication date: 1958
- Publication place: United States
- Media type: Print

The Capitalist Manifesto is a 1958 book by Louis O. Kelso, a lawyer-economist and Employee Stock Ownership Plan (ESOP) inventor, and Mortimer J. Adler, a neo-Thomist philosopher. Kelso and Adler detail the three principles of economic justice, Participation, Distribution, and Limitation. These principles laid the foundation of what eventually came to be called binary economics. The term "binary" comes from attributing all production (participation) and just distribution of income to two factors, the human, classified as labor, and the non-human, classified as capital. In the Preface, Adler acknowledged Kelso as the originator of the theory.

== Publication history ==
- New York: Random House, 1958.
- Westport, Connecticut: Greenwood Press, 1975.
- Whitefish, Montana: Literary Licensing, LLC, 2011.

== Reception ==
The Capitalist Manifesto was on The New York Times Non-Fiction Best Seller List in February and March 1958, ranking 15th and 13th, respectively, and was reviewed in a number of major publications, including Time, which stated that the book presents its analysis as "a revolutionary force in human affairs offering still unplumbed promise for the future," and that it "refutes the charge that capitalist thought has lost the imaginative flexibility to cope with the challenges of the age."
