= Total shareholder return =

Measure of stock performance over time

Total shareholder return (TSR) (or simply total return) is a measure of the performance of different companies' stocks and shares over time. It combines share price appreciation and dividends paid to show the total return to the shareholder expressed as an annualized percentage. It is calculated by the growth in capital from purchasing a share in the company assuming that the dividends are reinvested each time they are paid. This growth is expressed as a percentage as the compound annual growth rate.

The main benefit of TSR is that it allows the performance of shares to be compared even though some of the shares may have a high growth and low dividends and others may have low growth and high dividends.

Most stock market indices only use the growth of the prices of the companies making up the index. However, when they use TSR for the companies it is called a total return index or accumulation index. For example, corresponding to the S&P 500 index calculated by Standard and Poor's, there is the S&P 500 TR index.

In the technology sector, a study has found that regardless of a company's size, the more diverse the portfolio, the more difficult it is to generate high TSR.

In practice TSR is difficult to calculate since it involves knowing the price of the shares at the time the dividends are paid. However, as an approximation over one year it can be calculated as follows with:

$Price_{begin}$ = share price at beginning of year,

$Price_{end}$ = share price at end of year,

Dividends = dividends paid over year and

TSR = total shareholder return, TSR is computed as

$TSR={(Price_{end} - Price_{begin} + Dividends)}/{Price_{begin}}$
