= National Center for Employee Ownership =

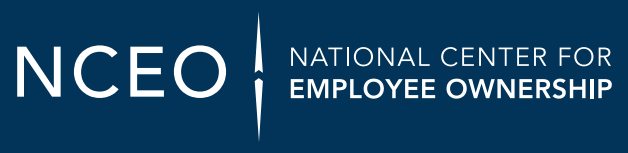
- Formation: 1981; 45 years ago
- Type: Nonprofit research organization
- Purpose: Advocate and research employee ownership of companies
- Location: Oakland, California, United States
- Region served: United States
- Website: www.nceo.org

The National Center for Employee Ownership (NCEO) is an American nonprofit research organization that gathers and disseminates data on employee ownership of the businesses by which they are employed. The organization was established in 1981 by Corey Rosen, then a staff member in the United States Senate who had become involved in drafting legislation on employee stock ownership plans (ESOPs).

== History ==
Rosen had gone to graduate school at Cornell University, where he was awarded a Ph.D. in 1973; his doctoral thesis concerned aspects of the politics of U.S. state legislatures. He then taught politics and government at Ripon College, before getting a fellowship from the American Political Science Association to work at the United States Congress.

In 1994, sociologist William Foote Whyte, one of the founding members of the NCEO board of directors, described the circumstances preceding the foundation of the NCEO, writing that "in the Reagan landslide of 1980, Senator Gaylord Nelson and Representative Peter Kostmayer lost their seats in Congress... That ended the congressional careers of Corey Rosen, Karen Young, and Joseph Blasi. Although this seemed a severe blow to the employee ownership movement, it did not turn out that way. Corey and Karen transferred their activities to their home in Arlington, Virginia, and established the National Center for Employee Ownership (NCEO)".

Although ESOPs were rare at the time, Rosen asserted that if more people understood them and the benefits they were asserted to provide for companies, more companies would adopt them. By January 1982, the fledgling organization reported having "350 members from unions, businesses, and trade associations". Also in January 1982, the organization sponsored "its first buyout symposium for labor unions". Later in 1982, Rosen published a book titled Employee Ownership: Issues, Resources and Legislation.

Over the course of the following decade, the organization relocated its headquarters to Oakland, California, and developed a substantial library of information and authority within the field. As of 1994, Whyte wrote that the NCEO had come to be recognized as the prime source for information and ideas on employee ownership", and that it was "increasingly well financed by membership and conference fees and research grants". Economic sociologist Joseph Blasi also served for a time on the board during this period.

As of 2022, the NCEO claims to have more than 3,000 members including both ESOP companies and academics.

== Structure and functions ==
The NCEO is a private, nonprofit, membership-based research and information organization. It was "formed to provide reliable, objective, comprehensive information about employee ownership", and remains "dedicated to providing information about and increasing understanding of employee ownership". The organization "serves as the leading source of accurate, unbiased information on employee stock ownership plans (ESOPs), broadly granted employee stock options, and employee participation programs", and "functions as a clearinghouse on employee ownership".

The NCEO "does not lobby on behalf of employee ownership; rather, it provides the most extensive library of publications dealing with virtually every facet of employee ownership". The organization thereby "helps encourage more companies to explore employee ownership by providing accurate, unbiased information and research on ESOPs, equity compensation plans such as stock options, and ownership culture".

=== Publications ===
The NCEO publishes information on employee ownership in a variety of formats, including "a newsletter, consultant listings, and many books and articles", covering "a wide range of issues relating to employee ownership". In particular, it publishes the Issue Brief series, "a monthly journal that typically addresses one major topic each month in significant detail" which has been described as "well-researched, peer reviewed, and often considered an authoritative resource for the employee ownership community". For most of its existence, it has also published the bimonthly periodical, Employee Ownership Report, which "features a wide range of topics, such as legal cases, legislative updates, original research, and significant events". The NCEO also provides publications and videos for the support of members, including "a standing inventory of relevant materials for immediate sale, including books, periodicals, employee communication materials, and research reports", with many titles originating as features in the Issue Brief series.

The NCEO also publishes an annual list of the top 100 employee-owned companies in the U.S.

=== Meetings and other activities ===
The NCEO "hosts conferences on the subject, provides information to the media, works with companies, unions, and employee groups considering employee ownership, and conducts research on the dynamics and effects of employee ownership". Most prominently, it has an annual conference, which is held "with a new location each year (typically in the month of April)" to maximize access, and holds employee workshops throughout the country each year.
