= Long-term incentive plan =

Payment in shares to incentivise company executives

A long-term incentive plan (LTIP) is a type of executive compensation that typically comes in the form of performance shares or matching shares of the company. In the United States, these plans were used heavily since Internal Revenue Code Section 162(m) passed, which permitted deductions for certain performance-based compensation without limitation. Upcoming changes in the Securities and Exchange Commission's executive compensation policies, however, may change this practice. LTIPs are also used in the United Kingdom. In Switzerland, LTIPs have seen a strong increase in use since the passing of the Swiss executive pay referendum, 2013. According to a recent report, two thirds of companies rely on a single performance condition in their long-term incentive plan and half of the performance-based long-term incentive plans include a relative performance conditions such as relative returns.

== See also ==
- Executive compensation
- Say on pay
