= Employee stock ownership plan =

Type of retirement plan in the United States

An employee stock ownership plan (ESOP) in the United States is a defined contribution plan, a form of retirement plan as defined by 4975(e)(7) of Internal Revenue Service (IRS) codes, which became a qualified retirement plan in 1974. It is one of the methods of employee participation in corporate ownership.

According to an analysis of data provided by the United States Department of Labor, there are approximately 6,237 companies in America with an ESOP. Notable U.S. employee-owned corporations include the 250,000 employee supermarket chain Publix Supermarkets, Hy-Vee, McCarthy Building Company, WinCo Foods, environmental consulting firm Citadel Environmental Services, Inc., and Harpoon Brewery. Today, most private U.S. companies that are operating as ESOPs are structured as S corporations ESOPs (S ESOPs).

According to The ESOP Association, a national trade association based in Washington, DC, the most common reason for establishing an ESOP is to buy stock from the owners of a closely held company. Many closely held companies have little or no succession plan in place. As a result, the day a founder or primary shareholder leaves the business often results in significant adverse consequences for the company, the employees, and the exiting owner. ESOPs offer transitional flexibility that can facilitate succession planning. Founders and main shareholders can sell to ESOPs all of their shares at one time, or percentages of their shares on the schedule of their choosing. The transition in leadership, therefore, can occur as quickly or slowly as the owner wishes.

== Forms ==
Like other tax-qualified deferred compensation plans, ESOPs must not discriminate in their operations in favor of highly compensated employees, officers, or owners. In an ESOP, a company sets up an employee benefit trust that is funded by contributing cash to buy company stock or contributing company shares directly. Alternately, the company can choose to have the trust borrow money to buy stock (also known as a leveraged ESOP, with the company making contributions to the plan to enable it to repay the loan). Generally, almost every full-time employee with a year or more of service who worked at least 20 hours a week is in an ESOP.

The United States ESOP model is tied to the unique US system encouraging private retirement savings plans and tax policies that reflect that goal. That makes it difficult to compare to other tax codes from other nations.

== S corporation ESOP ==
Most private US companies operating as an ESOP are structured as S corporation ESOPs (S ESOPs). The United States Congress established S ESOPs in 1998, to encourage and expand retirement savings by giving millions more American workers the opportunity to have equity in the companies where they work.

ESOP advocates credit S ESOPs with providing retirement security, job stability and worker retention, by the claimed culture, stability and productivity gains associated with employee-ownership. A study of a cross-section of Subchapter S firms with an Employee Stock Ownership Plan shows that S ESOP companies performed better in 2008 compared to non–S ESOP firms, paid their workers higher wages on average than other firms in the same industries, contributed more to their workers' retirement security, and hired workers when the overall U.S. economy was pitched downward and non–S ESOP employers were cutting jobs. Scholars estimate that annual contributions to employees of S ESOPs total around $14 billion. Critics say, however, that such studies fail to control for factors other than the existence of the ESOP, such as participatory management strategies, worker education, and pre-ESOP growth trends in individual companies. They maintain that no studies have shown that the presence of an ESOP itself causes any positive effects for companies or workers. One study estimates that the net US economic benefit from S ESOP savings, job stability and productivity totals $33 billion per year.

A study released in July 2012 found that S corporations with private employee stock ownership plans added jobs over the last decade more quickly than the overall private sector.

A 2013 study found that in 2010, 2,643 S ESOPs directly employed 470,000 workers and supported an additional 940,000 jobs, paid $29 billion in labor income to their own employees, with $48 billion in additional income for supported jobs, and tax revenue initiated by S ESOPs amounted to $11 billion for state and local governments and $16 billion for the federal government. Also, the study found that total output was equivalent to 1.7 percent of 2010 U.S. GDP. $93 billion (or 0.6 percent of GDP) came directly from S ESOPs, while output in supported industries totaled $153 billion (or 1.1 percent of GDP).

== Advantages and disadvantages to employees ==
In a U.S. ESOP, just as in every other form of qualified pension plan, employees do not pay taxes on the contributions until they receive a distribution from the plan when they leave the company. They can roll the amount over into an IRA, as can participants in any qualified plan. There is no requirement for a private sector employer to provide retirement savings plans for employees.

Some studies conclude that employee ownership appears to increase production and profitability and improve employees' dedication and sense of ownership. ESOP advocates maintain that the key variable in securing these claimed benefits is to combine an ESOP with a high degree of worker involvement in work-level decisions (employee teams, for instance). Employee stock ownership can increase the employees' financial risk if the company does badly.

ESOPs, by definition, concentrate workers' retirement savings in the stock of a single company. Such concentration is contrary to the central principle of modern investment theory, which is that investors should diversify their investments across many companies, industries, geographic locations, etc. Moreover, ESOPs concentrate workers' retirement savings in the stock of the same company on which they depend for their wages and current benefits, such as health insurance, worsening the non-diversification problem. High-profile examples illustrate the problem. Employees at companies such as Enron and WorldCom lost much of their retirement savings by overinvesting in company stock in their 401(k) plans, but the specific companies were not employee-owned. Enron, Polaroid and United Airlines, all of which had ESOPs when they went bankrupt, were C corporations.

Most S corporation ESOPs offer their employees at least one qualified retirement savings plan like a 401(k) in addition to the ESOP, allowing for greater diversification of assets. Studies in Massachusetts, Ohio, and Washington State show that on average, employees participating in the main form of employee ownership have considerably more in retirement assets than comparable employees in non-ESOP firms. The most comprehensive of the studies, a report on all ESOP firms in Washington state, found that the retirement assets were about three times as great, and the diversified portion of employee retirement plans was about the same as the total retirement assets of comparable employees in equivalent non-ESOP firms. The Washington study, however, showed that ESOP participants still had about 60% of their retirement savings invested in employer stock. Wages in ESOP firms were also 5–12% higher. National data from Joseph Blasi and Douglas Kruse at Rutgers shows that ESOP companies are more successful than comparable firms and, perhaps as a result, were more likely to offer additional diversified retirement plans alongside their ESOPs.

Opponents to ESOP have criticized these pro-ESOP claims and say many of the studies are conducted or sponsored by ESOP advocacy organizations and criticizing the methodologies used. Critics argue that pro-ESOP studies did not establish that ESOPs results in higher productivity and wages. ESOP advocates agree that an ESOP alone cannot produce such effects; instead, the ESOP must be combined with worker empowerment through participatory management and other techniques. Critics point out that no study has separated the effects of those techniques from the effects of an ESOP; that is, no study shows that innovative management cannot produce the same (claimed) effects without an ESOP.

In some circumstances, ESOP plans were designed that disproportionately benefit employees who enrolled earlier by accruing more shares to early employees. Newer employees, even at stable and mature ESOP companies can have limited opportunity to participate in the program, as a large portion of the shares may have already been allocated to longstanding employees.

ESOP advocates often maintain that employee ownership in 401(k) plans, as opposed to ESOPs, is problematic. About 17% of total 401(k) assets are invested in company stock, more in those companies that offer it as an option (although many do not). ESOP advocates concede that it may be an excessive concentration in a plan specifically meant to be for retirement security. In contrast, they maintain that it may not be a serious problem for an ESOP or other options, which they say are meant as wealth-building tools, preferably to exist alongside other plans. Nonetheless, ESOPs are regulated as retirement plans, and they are presented to employees as retirement plans, just like 401(k) plans.

== Comparison with 401(k) plans ==
ESOPs and 401(k)s are both retirement plans subject to the Employee Retirement Income Security Act (ERISA). While similar in some ways, the plans also have notable differences. These differences can form a strength: Businesses that offer both an ESOP and a 401(k), as 93.6 percent of The ESOP Association's members do, can offer the best of both plans to their employees.

=== Differences ===
- ESOP
  - In the vast majority of ESOPs, the company buys shares on behalf of the employees and places those shares in a trust; employees incur no out-of-pocket expense to participate.
  - ESOPs provide a retirement option for those employees who cannot afford to make a regular payroll deduction to a retirement plan.
  - Employees who can afford a payroll deduction still can make that contribution at many ESOP companies. The latest survey of ESOP Association members shows 93.6 percent of responding companies offer both an ESOP and a 401(k). Employees at these companies have two retirement plans. According to Pew, more than half of all employees don’t participate in any retirement plan at work.
- 401(k)
  - Typically, employees participate in a 401(k) by investing their own money via payroll deduction.
  - Employees who cannot afford a payroll deduction (and therefore cannot participate) often include those who are starting their careers, work in low-paying jobs, have significant family obligations, etc. In short, the employees who most need a retirement plan may be the ones who can least afford to participate in a 401(k).
  - A big incentive for participating in a 401(k) is getting the matching funds offered by most employers. To get all these funds, employees must contribute a certain amount (often twice what the employer contributes). Again, some employees cannot afford this investment.

== Conflicts of interest ==
Because ESOPs are the only retirement plans allowed by law to borrow money, they can be attractive to company owners and managers as instruments of corporate finance and succession. An ESOP formed using a loan, called a "leveraged ESOP", can provide a tax-advantaged means for the company to raise capital. According to a pro-ESOP organization, at least 75% of ESOPs are, or were at some time, leveraged. According to citing ESOP Association statistics as cited in. In addition, ESOPs can be attractive instruments of corporate succession, allowing a retiring shareholder to diversify the company of stock while deferring capital gains taxes indefinitely.

Company insiders face additional conflicts of interest in connection with an ESOP's purchase of company stock, which most often features company insiders as sellers and in connection with decisions about how to vote the shares of stock held by the ESOP but not yet allocated to participants' accounts. In a leveraged ESOP, such unallocated shares often far outnumber allocated shares for many years after the leveraged transaction.

== Timeline ==
This is a timeline of significant events in the development of ESOPs as a financial instrument, as well as some of the key personalities involved in developing the basic concepts, laws and organizations related to ESOPs in the United States:

- 1921 – Stock Bonus Plans are first defined in the Revenue Act of 1921, which also includes significant tax reductions.
- 1956 – Peninsula Newspapers, Inc., approaches Louis O. Kelso to develop a succession plan. Co-owners, both in their 80s, seek retirement without selling the company. Employee ownership is their desired option, but employees lack the capital to purchase the company. This leads Kelso to suggest borrowing through the company's IRS tax-qualified profit-sharing plan, which allows the loan to be paid off with before-tax dollars. Kelso dubs his innovation the "second income plan".
- 1958 – Expanding the employee ownership concept, Louis Kelso creates the world's first Consumer Stock Ownership Plan (CSOP), a trust that provides equity shares to consumers. The CSOP allows a group of dairy farmers in California's Central Valley to become customer/owners of Valley Nitrogen Producers.
- 1958 – Louis Kelso and Mortimer Adler coauthor The Capitalist Manifesto. The book presents the economic and moral case for employee ownership, arguing that a) wealth disparity is a negative force in society; b) most workers are excluded from ownership and prosperity, as they can only rely on their paychecks and have no way to acquire capital; c) with technological advances, capital will continue to become more productive, labor will find itself at an ever-greater disadvantage, and inequality will continually increase; and d) the working class can acquire an ownership stake in the economy with borrowed capital. Kelso calls this the "second income" principle.
- 1961 – Kelso and Adler's second book, The New Capitalists, is published by Random House. The book expands and develops their ideas for "capitalist democracy", proposing a number of methods to broaden the base of capital holders. The authors propose a regulatory and legal framework that would allow the average worker to borrow insured bank loans as investment capital.
- 1964 – The IRS relaxes its rules for benefits plan sponsors. Previously, plan and trust documents could only be submitted for approval at the IRS National Office; under the new rules, regional offices are empowered to issue approvals, as well. This greatly simplifies the process of setting up ESOP benefits plans.
- 1967 – Kelso and Patricia Hetter publish a third book on "capitalist democracy": Two-Factor Theory: The Economics of Reality (originally published under the title How to Turn Eighty Million Workers Into Capitalists on Borrowed Money). The book restates Kelso's thesis concerning productivity and broad access to capital, and discusses a number of policy suggestions, such as requirements for corporations to make monthly pay-outs of their entire pre-tax income to shareholders, which would then be taxed as ordinary income rather than capital gains.
- 1973 – The Employee Retirement Income Security Act is scheduled for a Congressional vote. The original version of the law prohibits any kind of lending within qualified retirement plans, effectively making leveraged ESOPs illegal. Kelso is introduced to Russell B. Long (D-LA), head of the Senate Finance Committee and "arguably the most powerful member of the Senate" at the time. Long sees merit in the ESOP concept and becomes a supporter, helping introduce language into ERISA that defines ESOPs and preserves their tax-advantaged status. In the words of Corey Rosen, a Senate Small Business Committee staffer in 1975–80 and later founder of the National Center for Employee Ownership (NCEO), "There'd be no ESOPs without Russell Long."
- 1974 – ERISA passes in Congress. The law contains requirements for companies with defined benefit plans to keep enough cash reserves to fund repurchase when employees retire. It is the first law to put a reference to ESOPs in the Internal Revenue Code (IRC); due to the fact that ERISA included extensive regulations prohibiting borrowing in context of defined benefit plans, Sen. Long's ESOP provisions took the form of an exception to these regulations. To this day, much of the ESOP framework is defined in the prohibited transaction section of the IRC: § 4975.
- 1975 – The Tax Reduction Act of 1975 creates a corporate tax credit for ESOPS (TRASOPs). This 1% credit is available to the corporate taxpayer with respect to qualified investment where at least one percent of the qualified investment is contributed to an ESOP.
- 1977 – Robert Smiley Jr. and Richard Acheson found the ESOP Council of America.
- 1977 – The Department of Labor attempts to introduce rules that would "kill" ESOPs. Dickson Buxton contacts his friend, Senator Robert Packwood (R-OR), who tells him that many senators oppose the new rules and recommends rallying ESOP companies to lobby against them. This leads Buxton, Harry Orchard, and a number of representatives of ESOP companies to form the National Association of ESOP Companies in San Francisco. Initial funding is provided by three CEOs of ESOP companies, who also become the first board and executive committee of the Association: Joe Dee of Brooks Cameras, Bob Pittman of Superior Cable, and Bill Hart of Pacific Paperboard Products. Two years later, the organization merges with the ESOP Council of America to form the ESOP Association.
- 1978 – The Revenue Act of 1978 puts new ESOP rules on the books, creating IRC Section 409: § 409. This section defines which benefit plans can qualify as a "tax credit ESOP".
- 1979 – The National Association of ESOP Companies and the ESOP Council of America merge and form the ESOP Association.
- 1979 – The auto maker Chrysler is on the verge of bankruptcy, and chairman Lee Iacocca approaches Congress for an emergency bailout credit. Congress passes the Chrysler Corporation Loan Guarantee Act of 1979 and saves the company; one condition of the emergency credit line is that an ESOP be set up that benefits at least 90% of eligible employees, and totals no less than $162.5 million in contributions over four years. (Public Law 96-185, Section 1866)
- 1981 – The Economic Recovery Tax Act of 1981 (ERTA) replaces the TRASOP with the PAYSOP, which provided a tax credit of a varying percentage of employee payroll based on the form of compensation.
- 1984 – Congress passes the Tax Reform Act of 1984, which includes a number of tax incentives, both general and specific to ESOPs. In order to incentivize bank lending to ESOPs, the law includes a 50% exclusion from income tax for interest paid on ESOP loans. The law also introduces deduction limitations for ESOPs, and allows owners who sell to ESOPs in C corporations that own at least 30% of the stock to defer capital gains taxes by reinvesting in other companies. The Act limited the PAYSOP tax credit to 1/2 of a percent of payroll based on the compensation.
- 1986 –Congress passes the Tax Reform Act of 1986, which allowed the PAYSOP tax credit to expire, ending the payroll-based ESOP program.
- 1989 – Chairman of the House Ways & Means Committee Dan Rostenkowski makes a revenue reconciliation proposal (H.R. 2572) that would repeal the interest exclusion for ESOP loans, which permitted the lender to avoid paying taxes on 50% of the interest received for an ESOP loan. Rostenkowski's proposal estimates the action to bring over $10 billion in revenue in the 1990–1994 fiscal years. Due to intensive lobbying by the ESOP Association, the tax benefits remain on the books, but with a number of restrictions adopted in the Omnibus Budget Reconciliation Act of 1989.
- 1991 – Louis Kelso dies at 77 in San Francisco, California.
- 1996 – Interest income exclusion for ESOPs is repealed by Congress in the Small Business Job Protection Act of 1996 (SBJPA). The SBJPA also made ESOPs available to S corporation shareholders.
- 1997 – Congress passes the Taxpayer Relief Act of 1997, which repealed the Unrelated Business Taxable Income (UBTI) rules for S corporation income allocated to an ESOP.
- 2001 – The United States Congress enacts Internal Revenue Code Section 409(p), which effectively requires for ESOP benefits to be shared equitably by investors and workers. This ensures that the ESOP includes everyone from the receptionist to the CFO.

== See also ==
- Employee stock option
- Employee stock ownership
- Employee stock purchase plan
- Cooperative

== Sources ==
- Kind, Ron; Paulsen, Erik (2012). "A Model for Sound Retirement". The Hill. Washington, DC.
- Brill, Alex (2012). "An Analysis of the Benefits S ESOPs Provide the U.S. Economy and Workforce" (PDF).
- Rosen, Corey, Understanding ESOPs, National Center for Employee Ownership, Oakland, CA, 2010, www.nceo.org
- Stumpff, Andrew W. (2009), "Fifty Years of Utopia: The Weird History of the Employee Stock Ownership Plan", Tax Lawyer (Winter 2009), Georgetown University Law School/American Bar Association: 419–432, SSRN 1624386
- Menke, John D.; Buxton, Dickson C. (2010), "The Origin and History of the ESOP and Its Future Role as a Business Succession Tool", Journal of Financial Service Professionals (May 2010), Society of Financial Service Professionals, archived from the original on February 15, 2019
