= Redwashing =

Adopting inauthentic left-wing rhetoric for gain

Red is historically the colour associated with the political left. (Note: Except in the United States, particularly among organized political parties)

Redwashing is the practice of a collective entity presenting itself as progressive and concerned about social equality and justice, in order to use this perception for public relations or economic gain. In politics, the term typically refers to right wing populists adopting left wing ideals. The term is also sometimes used to denote the practice of discrediting a certain organization or political party that really defends social equality. In Canada, corporations are often accused by Indigenous news media of redwashing.

== Description ==
The term redwashing is derived from combining red with whitewashing. It is the practice of a state, organization, political party, or company presenting itself as progressive and concerned about social equality and justice, in order to use this perception for public relations or economic gain.

In regard to the sphere of politics specifically, the term typically refers to right wing populists adopting left wing ideals. According to commentators, it is common practice among right-wing politicians to adopt the rhetoric of left-wing politics to appeal to a wider segment of the electorate. As examples, Angela Merkel and Nicolas Sarkozy criticised market excess, although they did not offer any policy changes to combat this whilst in power. Similarly, the British National Party embraced protectionism to appeal to social democrat voters facing issues related to globalization.

The term redwashing is also sometimes used to denote the practice of discrediting a certain organization or political party that really defends social equality. In these cases, it seeks to delegitimize the argument of these collectives by presenting it as extremist or obsolete, trying to give the impression that it is a leftist ideology that is dangerous for the social group and in opposition to another idea that is shown to be more reasonable.

== Indigenous redwashing ==
In Canada, corporations are often accused by Indigenous news media of redwashing if they attempt to show themselves as benevolent through sponsorship of Indigenous education, art, or culture to obfuscate harmful practices and cover up their history of colonialism.

Syncrude and Petro Canada are some of the largest employers of Indigenous people, but their ecological impact has long-term detrimental effects on Indigenous land rights, water and health. These companies, among others, sponsor cultural institutions whilst simultaneously attempting to cover up the problems they cause.

== See also ==
- -washing
- Astroturfing
- Bolibourgeoisie
- Brand management
- Community capitalism
- Corporate sociopolitical activism
- Fair-weather friend
- Gauche caviar
- Humanistic capitalism
- Inclusive capitalism
- Inclusive growth
- Neo-capitalism
- Performative activism
- Progressive capitalism
- Red-baiting
- Social imperialism
- Social-desirability bias
- Welfare capitalism
