= Friedman doctrine =

Theory that the only social responsibility of business is to increase its profits

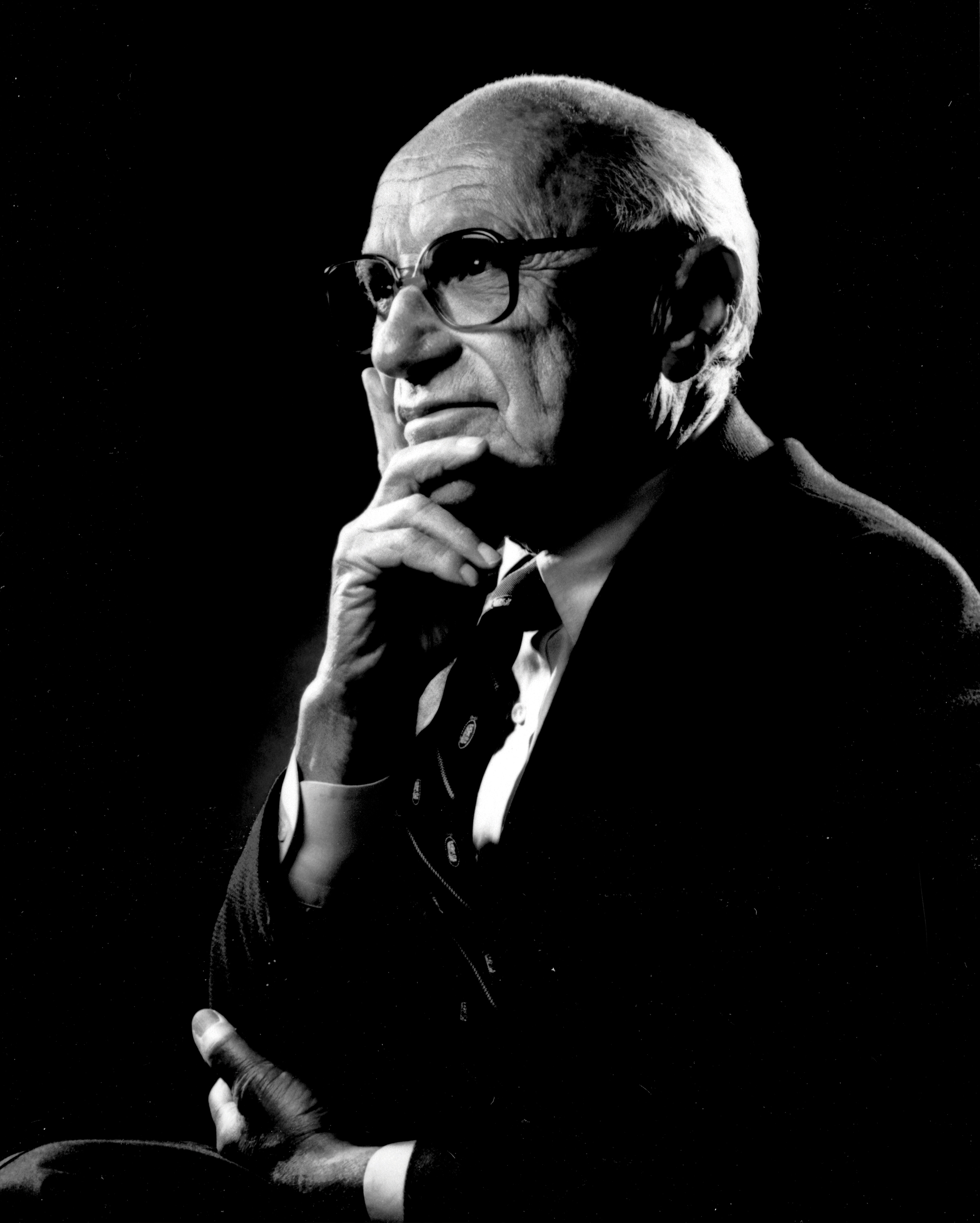
Portrait of Milton Friedman

The Friedman doctrine, also called shareholder theory, is a normative theory of business ethics advanced by economist Milton Friedman that holds that the social responsibility of business is to increase its profits. This shareholder primacy approach views shareholders as the economic engine of the organization and the only group to which the firm is socially responsible. As such, the goal of the firm is to increase its profits and maximize returns to shareholders. Friedman argued that the shareholders can then decide for themselves what social initiatives to take part in rather than have an executive whom the shareholders appointed explicitly for business purposes decide such matters for them.

The Friedman doctrine has been very influential in the corporate world from the 1980s to the 2000s. It has also attracted criticism, particularly since the 2008 financial crisis, caused by various financial institutions which engaged in excessive risk for profit maximization, causing the bubble and collapse of the American real estate market that triggered the crisis throughout the wider global economy.

== Overview ==
Friedman introduced the theory in a 1970 essay for The New York Times titled "A Friedman Doctrine: The Social Responsibility of Business is to Increase Its Profits". In it, he argued that a company has no social responsibility to the public or society; its only responsibility is to its shareholders. He justified this view by considering to whom a company and its executives are beholden:

In a free-enterprise, private-property system, a corporate executive is an employee of the owners of the business. He has direct responsibility to his employers. That responsibility is to conduct the business in accordance with their desires ... the key point is that, in his capacity as a corporate executive, the manager is the agent of the individuals who own the corporation ... and his primary responsibility is to them.

Friedman argued that an executive spending company money on social issues is in effect spending somebody else's money for their own purposes:

Insofar as [a business executive's] actions in accord with his "social responsibility" reduce returns to stockholders, he is spending their money. Insofar as his actions raise the price to customers, he is spending the customers' money. Insofar as his actions lower the wages of some employees, he is spending their money.

Friedman argued that the appropriate agents of social causes are individuals—"The stockholders or the customers or the employees could separately spend their own money on the particular action if they wished to do so." He concluded by quoting from his 1962 book Capitalism and Freedom that "there is one and only one social responsibility of business—to use its resources and engage in activities designed to increase its profits so long as it stays within the rules of the game, which is to say, engages in open and free competition without deception or fraud."

In Capitalism and Freedom, Friedman had argued that when companies concern themselves with the community rather than profit it leads to corporatism, consistent with his statement in the first paragraph of the 1970 essay that "businessmen" with a social conscience "are unwitting puppets of the intellectual forces that have been undermining the basis of a free society".

The Friedman doctrine was amplified after the publication of an influential 1976 business paper by finance professors William Meckling and Michael C. Jensen, "Theory of the Firm: Managerial Behavior, Agency Costs and Ownership Structure", which provided a quantitative economic rationale for maximizing shareholder value.

== Influence ==
Shareholder theory has had a significant impact in the corporate world. In 2016, The Economist called shareholder theory "the biggest idea in business", stating "today shareholder value rules business". In 2017, Harvard Business School professors Joseph L. Bower and Lynn S. Paine stated that maximizing shareholder value "is now pervasive in the financial community and much of the business world. It has led to a set of behaviors by many actors on a wide range of topics, from performance measurement and executive compensation to shareholder rights, the role of directors, and corporate responsibility."

Shareholder theory has led to a marked rise in stock-based compensation, particularly to CEOs, in an attempt to align the financial interests of employees with those of shareholders.

In September 2020, 50 years after publishing "A Friedman Doctrine", The New York Times published 22 short responses to Friedman's essay written by 25 prominent people. In November 2020, the Stigler Center of the University of Chicago Booth School of Business published a compendium of 28 articles on the legacy of Friedman. Finance professor Alex Edmans compared Friedman's article to the Modigliani–Miller theorem, arguing that Friedman's conclusion is incorrect but that the article is instructive because it highlights the assumptions required for it to be true. Accordingly, Stigler Center director Luigi Zingales argued that the Friedman doctrine should be considered a theorem, not a doctrine.

== Criticism ==
The Friedman doctrine is controversial, with critics variously saying it is wrong on financial, economic, legal, social, or moral grounds.

It has been criticized by proponents of the stakeholder theory, who believe the Friedman doctrine is inconsistent with the idea of corporate social responsibility to a variety of stakeholders. They argue it is morally imperative that a business takes into account all of the people who are affected by its decisions. They also argue that taking into account the interests of stakeholders can benefit the company and its shareholders; for example, a company donating services or goods to help those hurt in a natural disaster is not acting in the direct interest of its shareholders, but in doing so builds community allegiance to the company, ultimately benefitting the company and its shareholders. In 2019, influential business groups such as the World Economic Forum and the Business Roundtable updated their mission statement, leaving behind the Friedman doctrine in favor of "stakeholder capitalism", at least on paper if not in widespread practice.

Friedman's characterization of moral responsibility has been questioned. Ronald Duska, in a 1997 article in the Journal of Business Ethics, as well as in his 2007 book Contemporary Reflections on Business Ethics, argued that Friedman failed to differentiate two very different aspects of business: (1) the motive of individuals, who are often motivated by profit to participate in business, and (2) the socially sanctioned purpose of business, or the reason why people allow businesses to exist, which is to provide goods and services to people. Duska said of a hypothetical businessperson's belief that there is no business ethics beyond making a profit: "Does that mean [the businessperson] is likely to give you a faulty product if he can get away with it and make more profit? If he really believes what he says, aren't you a fool to do business with him?" John Friedman (no relation to Milton Friedman), writing in the Huffington Post in 2013, said: "Mr. Friedman argues that a corporation, unlike a person, cannot have responsibility. No one would engage in a business contract with a corporation if they thought for one minute that a corporation was not responsible to pay its bills, for example. So clearly, therefore, a corporation can have legal, but also moral responsibilities." In contrast to such criticism of Friedman's business ethics, some scholars have pointed out that Friedman emphasized respect for the liberty of other people, respect for the law, and various duties of companies, so the Friedman doctrine does not advocate unconstrained pursuit of profit, and that the Friedman doctrine overlaps with, or even entails, corporate social responsibility.

Left-wing social activist Naomi Klein argued in her 2007 book The Shock Doctrine that adherence to the Friedman doctrine has impoverished most citizens while enriching corporate elites.

Other scholars argue that it is unhealthy and counterproductive to the companies that practice it. Harvard Business School professors Joseph L. Bower and Lynn S. Paine said in 2017 that the Friedman doctrine is "distracting companies and their leaders from the innovation, strategic renewal, and investment in the future that require their attention", puts companies at risk of "activist shareholder attack", and puts "managers ... under increasing pressure to deliver ever faster and more predictable returns and to curtail riskier investments aimed at meeting future needs." The Economist said in 2016 that a focus on short-term shareholder value has become "a license for bad conduct, including skimping on investment, exorbitant pay, high leverage, silly takeovers, accounting shenanigans and a craze for share buy-backs, which are running at $600 billion a year in America".

In 2019, Jerry Useem writing in The Atlantic, and prominent Democratic Senators Chuck Schumer and Bernie Sanders writing in The New York Times, argued that shareholder theory, which promoted a rise in stock-based compensation, has led executives to enrich themselves by implementing stock buybacks—often to the detriment of the companies they work for. The critics argued this diverts company funds away from potentially more profitable or socially valuable avenues, like research and design, reduces productivity, and increases inequality by delivering money to higher-paid employees who receive stock-based compensation and not to lower-paid employees who do not.

Lawrence Mishel, distinguished fellow of the Economic Policy Institute, argued in 2020 that wages have been kept low in the United States because of the Friedman doctrine, namely the adoption of corporate practices and economic policies (or the blocking of reforms) at the behest of business and the wealthy elite, which resulted in the systematic disempowerment of workers. He argued that the lack of worker power caused wage suppression, increased wage inequality, and exacerbated racial disparities. Notably, mechanisms such as excessive unemployment, globalization, eroded labor standards (and their lack of enforcement), weakened collective bargaining, and corporate structure changes that disadvantage workers, all collectively functioned to keep wages low. From 1979 to 2019, while economy-wide productivity rose 61.8 percent, hourly compensation for production and non-supervisory workers increased only 17.5 percent, whilst the earnings of the top 1 percent and 0.1 percent increased 158 percent and 341 percent, respectively.

In January 2022, billionaire hedge fund manager and investor Paul Tudor Jones attributed the opioid epidemic in the United States as a product of the Friedman doctrine. Notably, the theory of corporations having the only objective of profit maximization (without any consideration of other stakeholders), led Purdue Pharma and the Sackler family to engage in unethical corporate practices of increasing revenue, by abetting doctors to dispense prescription opioids, without any legitimate medical purpose. The opioid epidemic resulted in at least 400,000 adult deaths by prescription drug overdose within the United States, most of which would have been part of the workforce within the economy of the United States.

== See also ==
- Neoliberalism

=== Contrary ideas ===
- Community capitalism
- Corporate social entrepreneurship
- Environmental, social, and governance
- Social enterprise
- Social venture capital
- Stakeholder theory
- Sustainable capitalism
