= Lynn Forester de Rothschild =

American-British businesswoman (born 1954)

- Born: Lynn Forester; July 2, 1954 (age 72); Oradell, New Jersey, U.S.
- Education: Pomona College (BA); Columbia University (JD); Geneva Graduate Institute
- Political party: Democratic
- Spouses: Alexander Platt (m. 1978, divorced) Andrew Stein (m. 1983; div. 1993) Sir Evelyn de Rothschild (m. 2000, died 2022)
- Children: 2

Lynn Forester, Lady de Rothschild (born July 2, 1954) is an American-British businesswoman who is the chair of E.L. Rothschild, a holding company she owns (previously together with her third husband, Sir Evelyn Robert de Rothschild, a member of the Rothschild family, until his death).

The company manages investments in the Economist Group, owner of The Economist magazine, Congressional Quarterly and the Economist Intelligence Unit, E.L. Rothschild LP, a leading independent wealth management firm in the United States, as well as real estate, agricultural and food interests.

She rallies for a political movement called Inclusive Capitalism Initiative, and led the Conference of Inclusive Capitalism in London in 2014 and 2015. Rothschild founded the Coalition for Inclusive Capitalism and the Council for Inclusive Capitalism.

== Early life and education ==
Born in Bergen County, New Jersey, a suburb of greater New York City, Rothschild was raised in Oradell, New Jersey, the only girl among three brothers, and is the daughter of Annabelle (née Hewitt) and John Kenneth Forester, president and owner of the General Aviation Aircraft Service (now Meridian, in Teterboro, New Jersey). She studied at Pomona College and Columbia Law School, where she volunteered for the United States Senate campaign of Democrat Daniel Patrick Moynihan. She also studied international law on a Rotary fellowship at the Geneva Graduate Institute in Switzerland.

== Career ==
After leaving law school, she was an associate at the Simpson Thacher & Bartlett law firm for four years, before working for telecommunications billionaire John Kluge in the 1980s, helping him acquire small companies that held local cellular licenses.

Rothschild became Executive Vice President for Development at Metromedia Inc from 1984 to 1989.

=== with Motorola (1989-1995) ===
Rothschild then invested in telecoms businesses in North America and Europe, in partnership with Motorola. From 1989 to 1995, Rothschild was the majority shareholder, chairman and CEO, of TPI Communications International, Inc., one of the largest providers of paging, wireless data and cellular telephone service in Latin America, owned with Motorola.

Under her management, TPI tripled its size and per-customer revenues, and cash flow grew to three times the U.S. average. In addition, she expanded operations from Puerto Rico into Latin America. She sold her stake in TPI to Motorola in 1995 for a figure reportedly between $80 million and $100 million.

=== with FirstMark (1995-2000) ===
In 1995, Rothschild founded FirstMark Communications Inc in the United States, a broadband wireless company. In 1997, she sold her US interests in order to focus on international opportunities. In 1998, she founded FirstMark Communications of Europe, with the mission of building a pan-European broadband Internet company. Having secured licenses in Germany, France, Spain, Switzerland, Luxembourg and Finland, she built a 20,000 km fiber network in 15 countries. The company was sold in June 2000 in a $1 billion financing, the largest private equity placement in the history of the European competitive telecommunications sector.

=== E.L. Rothschild (2003-present) ===
She is now the chair of E.L. Rothschild, a holding company she owns (previously together with her third husband).

The company manages investments in The Economist Group, owner of The Economist magazine, Congressional Quarterly and the Economist Intelligence Unit (all sold in 2026), E.L. Rothschild LP, a leading independent wealth management firm in the United States, as well as real estate, agricultural and food interests.

=== Board memberships ===
Rothschild currently serves on the Board of Directors of Estée Lauder Companies, The Economist Group, Bronfman, E.L. Rothschild LP and Christies International. She has also served on the Boards of Directors of Gulfstream Aerospace Corporation and General Instruments, Inc.

=== Politics ===
Rothschild is involved in policy and social issues, including addressing income inequalities, support of small and medium businesses, micro-finance, business ethics, and women's rights.

From 1993 to 1995, Rothschild served on President Bill Clinton's National Information Infrastructure Advisory Council. From 1998 to 2000, she served on the US Secretary of Energy's advisory committee.

Rothschild has donated to all of Bill and Hillary Clinton's federal races since 1992. Although Rothschild was a major fundraiser for Hillary Clinton's 2008 presidential bid, she transferred her support to Republican candidate John McCain when Barack Obama beat Clinton, becoming a minor celebrity on cable television at the time for attacking Obama in a series of interviews.

On June 22, 2011, she hosted a fundraiser for Jon Huntsman Jr.'s presidential campaign, an event originally planned to support Mitt Romney before she had a change of heart in the early summer of 2011. In the summer of 2016, she hosted a fundraiser for Hillary Clinton's 2016 presidential campaign.

In 2012, Rothschild co-chaired the Henry Jackson Society's Initiative (HJI) for Inclusive Capitalism task force, which aimed to mitigate the consequences of the 2008 financial crisis and associated protest movement, Occupy Wall Street. Rothschild said,

Capitalism is under siege, but the HJI believes that it remains the most powerful economic system we have for raising people out of poverty and improving societies. Industry, innovation and enterprise must be anchored by an ethical, responsible and inclusive capitalist system. We started this initiative to foster debate and dialogue about how capitalism can be improved, and to highlight the many excellent efforts of businesses that are taking the lead in the areas that most need improvement. We've already begun showcasing concrete programs that will create a demonstrable impact on the future of capitalism, and we are committed to expanding our efforts in the U.S. and around the world. We hope to include all stakeholders in this effort, from managers to investors to employees to customers and to society at large.

Rothschild founded the day-long Conference of Inclusive Capitalism in London on May 27, 2014, with the aim of adjusting the capitalist system to work for more people, and included an opening address by Prince Charles and guest speaker Bill Clinton. The second conference took place in London on June 26, 2015.

In 2006, she was appointed as a member of the UN Advisors Group on Inclusive Financial Services. She serves as chairman of the board for the American Patrons of the Tate Gallery, FAI, and the International Advisory Board of Columbia University School of Law. In addition, she serves as a Trustee of the ERANDA Foundation (a Rothschild family foundation), the Outward Bound Trust, the Alfred Herrhausen Society of International Dialogue of Deutsche Bank and the Global Commercial Microfinance Consortium Advisory Board of Deutsche Bank. She also sits on the board of the McCain Institute.

She is a member of the Council on Foreign Relations (USA), Chatham House (UK), the Institute for Strategic Studies (UK), the board of the Peterson Institute for International Economics, the board of the Alfred Herrhausen Society of International Dialogue of Deutsche Bank, the International Advisory Council of Asia House (UK), and the Foreign Policy Association (USA).

== Personal life ==
Rothschild has been married three times. Her first marriage was to Alexander Hartley Platt of New Jersey, and took place at Brick Presbyterian Church on May 20, 1978.

Her second husband was Andrew Stein (born March 4, 1945), a New York politician and son of multi-millionaire businessman Jerry Finkelstein. Stein was Manhattan Borough President at the time of their marriage on March 12, 1983. The couple had two sons before they divorced in 1993.

Her third husband was Sir Evelyn de Rothschild (August 29, 1931 – November 7, 2022), whom she was introduced to by Henry Kissinger at the 1998 Bilderberg Group conference in Scotland. They married on November 30, 2000, in London, England, after de Rothschild divorced his wife in 2000. She was his third wife. On the announcement of the marriage, the Rothschild couple were invited to spend their honeymoon at the White House by the Clintons. The couple divided their time between homes in New York and London, a summer home on Martha's Vineyard, and the Rothschild family's historic Ascott country estate in England. By virtue of her marriage to a knight, she is known socially as Lady de Rothschild.

In December 2024, it was reported in The Times that Rothschild was in a new relationship with Maurice Saatchi.

She has said that, as a student she proselytized for a Presbyterian church, converted to Judaism at one point, and later again became a devout Christian.

=== Epstein link ===
Rothschild was friends with financier Jeffrey Epstein, later a convicted sex offender. He said he had given her financial help in the 1990s during her divorce from Andrew Stein, although a spokesperson for Rothschild said this was "one hundred percent false." According to Epstein's lawyer, Alan Dershowitz, he was introduced to Epstein by Rothschild, who referred to him as an "interesting autodidact" who he would enjoy getting to know. According to Ghislaine Maxwell, it was Rothschild who introduced Prince Andrew to Epstein. It was at a house owned by the de Rothschilds in Martha's Vineyard where Peter Mandelson was introduced to Epstein.
