= Progressive capitalism =

Approach to capitalism

Progressive capitalism is an economic framework within fiscal progressivism that pairs government intervention with competitive markets to foster economic growth while mitigating inequality through targeted public policies. It combines market-driven innovation with targeted government investment in education, infrastructure, and healthcare, while establishing public alternatives in essential services. Progressive capitalism is distinguished from socialism by preserving private enterprise and from neoliberalism by supporting regulatory interventions to correct perceived market failures. Unlike socialism, it preserves market competition; unlike neoliberalism, it enforces regulatory guardrails. Proponents argue that regulatory oversight and public investment can promote wider economic participation and more equitable outcomes than unregulated markets or complete state control. Critics argue that its incremental reforms may not address deeper systemic issues within capitalism.

Historically, progressive capitalism has been associated with periods of significant economic growth and reduced inequality, such as the New Deal and the Golden age of capitalism in the mid-20th century. It contrasts sharply with neoliberal free market capitalism, which tends to reject such interventions in favor of self-regulating markets with more narrowly distributed results. Since the early 2000s, progressive capitalism has been prominently advocated by New Keynesian economist Joseph Stiglitz, by British politician David Sainsbury following his 2013 book "Progressive Capitalism: How to Achieve Economic Growth, Liberty and Social Justice", and by U.S. Congressman Ro Khanna (representing California's 17th district since 2017).

== Definition ==
As defined by economist Joseph Stiglitz, progressive capitalism is a form of capitalism that proposes a new social contract to rebalance the roles of the market, the state, and civil society, leveraging market forces and entrepreneurship to enhance societal wellbeing. By rewriting economic rules, it addresses issues like market dominance, ensuring globalization benefits all citizens, and implementing government investments in technology, education, and green infrastructure, alongside public options for essential services. Stiglitz has also described progressive capitalism as "a better balance of government, markets, and civil society". Stiglitz elaborated that this balance requires stronger regulatory frameworks and public investment to counteract market concentration, distinguishing it from both laissez-faire capitalism and state-directed economies.

Progressive capitalism is often presented as an economic approach that is in the middle between socialism and neoliberalism. Stiglitz has stated that progressive capitalism responds to the debate between capitalism and socialism by emphasizing reforms within the capitalist system. Progressive capitalism contrasts with traditional socialism, which advocates extensive state control of production. While socialist movements historically dominated European politics in the 20th century, contemporary European social democracies have largely abandoned demands for complete state ownership of productive assets. Economist Mark Cooper proposes a periodization that divides US economic history into two paradigms: free market fundamentalism (Gilded Age 1869–1886, Post-WWI period 1917–1932, Neoliberalism 1980–2008) and progressive capitalism (New Deal 1933–1946, Golden Age 1947–1970). However, this binary framework of free market fundamentalism represents one scholar's analytical approach and does not reflect consensus among economic historians, who employ various competing periodization schemes. While progressive capitalism advocates for policies to correct market abuses and achieve socially beneficial outcomes, free market fundamentalism rejects such interventions, arguing that markets will self-correct and that regulation and antitrust enforcement only hinder business. Proponents of free market fundamentalism believe minimal government interference will lead to overall public benefit, despite the potential for worsening existing problems. Stiglitz argues that market fundamentalists wrongly label progressive capitalism as socialism, whereas it is distinctly neither socialism nor market socialism.

== History ==
Progressive capitalism builds on the foundational ideas of John Maynard Keynes and Franklin D. Roosevelt, adapting their vision to the contemporary economic landscape. Keynes and Roosevelt advocated for a tempered capitalism where government played a crucial, though limited, role in ensuring stability, efficiency, and equity—goals that remain relevant today. This approach serves as a basis for modern progressive capitalism, which seeks to address the shortcomings of unfettered capitalism by promoting human freedom and balancing market forces with regulatory and public interventions.

Mark Cooper categorizes US economic periods into two main models: free market fundamentalism and progressive capitalism. Free market fundamentalism includes the Gilded Age (1869–1886), the Post-WWI Roar (1917–1932), and Neoliberalism (1980–2008). Progressive capitalism encompasses the New Deal (1933–1946) and the Golden Age (1947–1970), with transitional periods including the Progressive Era (1887–1916), the Crisis (1970–1979), and the Obama administration (2009–2015).

According to Cooper, progressive capitalism has been shown to outperform neoliberalism across key economic indicators using econometric analysis and that during the progressive capitalism era (1933–1972), GDP growth surged by 2.78%, compared to a modest 1.51% under neoliberalism (1980–2008) and that productivity growth also favored progressive capitalism, showing an increase of 2.60% versus 0.84% for neoliberalism. Private investment levels were higher under progressive capitalism at 1.66%, while neoliberalism saw only 0.29%. Unemployment rates improved more under progressive capitalism, decreasing by 2.62%, compared to a reduction of 1.08% under neoliberalism.

== Overview ==
=== Core principles ===
Progressive capitalism principles include recognizing excessive corporate power as oppressive, viewing government as a check on private excess, understanding diverse methods for distributing economic benefits, valuing secure and well-paid workers as capitalism's consumers, and rejecting a trade-off between fairness and economic growth, with reduced inequality potentially fostering greater prosperity. A central tenet of progressive capitalism is its focus on enhancing overall well-being, going beyond GDP metrics with the explicit goal of reducing inequality across measurable dimensions such as income distribution and access to essential services.

Stiglitz delineates four key priorities of progressive capitalism. Firstly, it restores equilibrium among markets, the state, and civil society to tackle issues like economic stagnation, rising inequality, and environmental degradation through government regulation and investment. Secondly, recognizing the pivotal role of scientific inquiry and social cooperation in wealth generation, it supports markets governed by the rule of law and democratic oversight. Thirdly, addressing the problem of concentrated market power, which contributes to inequality and stifles economic growth, by curbing the dominance of large corporations. Finally, progressive capitalism seeks to sever the nexus between economic and political influence, advocating for reforms to reduce the sway of money in politics and mitigate wealth inequality, ultimately fostering a fairer and more prosperous society.

According to Richard North Patterson, the credo of progressive capitalism is grounded in several core principles: oppressive corporate power can be as stifling as oppressive government; government should act as a check on private excess rather than as a collaborator; there is no universal formula for distributing prosperity; well-compensated workers are valuable customers, not antagonists; and, crucially, there is no inherent trade-off between fairness and growth. Instead, addressing inequality can enhance both economic prosperity and fairness, potentially expanding the overall economic "pie." Patterson states that:

The goal of progressive capitalism is restoring societal balance by recognizing that private enterprise is the core of a broadly successful economy, but that the ideology of supposedly-unfettered markets underpinning shareholder capitalism—abetted, in reality, by subjective public policy choices—is inefficient, destabilizing, and far from inevitable.

Progressive capitalism aims to enhance America's prosperity by facilitating the expansion of individual opportunity instead of nurturing perpetual reliance on an excessively intrusive government. Aligned with progressive capitalism are societal aims such as prioritizing education from K-12 to adapt to the evolving economy, ensuring relief from college and student debt, and offering comprehensive support for families, including access to healthcare. It advocates reforms to create a more progressive tax system, strengthening the social safety net, combating workplace discrimination, addressing racial and economic segregation in housing and affordability, upgrading national infrastructure, and fostering economic growth in stagnant communities where relocation is challenging.

Stiglitz argues that progressive capitalism aims to build a society characterized by greater creativity, care, honesty, and empathy, which in turn will enhance both economic and social functioning. He contends that this vision, while retaining the term "capitalism," represents a significant departure from current practices. In this framework, "capital" encompasses not only physical and financial assets but also human, intellectual, organizational, social, and natural capital—reflecting the evolving nature of the economy and society. According to Stiglitz, progressive capitalism addresses key elements of a "good and decent" society. It focuses on living in harmony with nature through strong environmental regulations, an area where current capitalism falls short. It also aims to help individuals flourish and reach their potential by implementing predistribution and redistribution strategies. While current capitalism often undermines honesty, empathy, and cooperation, progressive capitalism promotes these values through a supportive framework of institutional arrangements.

Progressive capitalism should not aim to create perpetual dependency on an overreaching government but should focus on enhancing America by broadening individual opportunities. While it is realistic to acknowledge that some inherent and environmental disadvantages cannot be eliminated, progressive capitalism seeks to address and reduce those disadvantages that have been artificially intensified.

=== Progressive capitalism and markets ===
Stiglitz has clarified that progressive capitalism is not "anti-market," progressive capitalism embraces markets while recognizing the necessity of diverse institutions including government, civil society, and non-profit entities like universities. It advocates a balanced approach to economy. Progressive capitalism underscores the importance of corporations, small businesses, and profit-making firms, while also advocating for government involvement in regulation and investment. The framework advocates for regulation and antitrust measures to ensure competition, countering neoliberal claims that such policies are unnecessary. Some analyses suggest that regulatory measures associated with progressive capitalism can address market power and improve competitive performance in financial services.

Progressive capitalism, as defined by Stiglitz, integrates profit-oriented enterprises with a crucial role for collective action and regulation. Unlike the neoliberal belief that markets alone are the solution, progressive capitalism advocates for a balanced approach where the state actively regulates to ensure competition and prevent exploitation. This system aims to expand freedoms through well-designed public investments and fair regulations, funded by taxes. It also seeks to prevent market distortions from the anti-competitive concentration of power and wealth, which can occur in unfettered capitalism, by promoting competition and implementing redistributive measures.

The Brandeis-Stiglitz model of progressive capitalism posits that capitalism succeeds when it equally supports capital—through profit linked to investment—and labor—through productivity linked to wages. Evidence of this effectiveness includes high economic growth, low unemployment, and reduced inequality. This success is achieved by balancing benefits between capital and labor and implementing socially determined redistribution of surplus to address market-produced inequalities. A strong entrepreneurial state supports capital with high-risk project financing, infrastructure, and creating new markets, and aiding labor through education, skill training, childcare and housing.

Neoliberals often claim that improving the economic performance of poor countries hinges solely on adjusting prices, with the expectation that this will lead to broader economic improvements. In contrast, progressive capitalism, as championed by David Sainsbury, argues that governments must also play a crucial role in developing essential economic institutions. Sainsbury envisions a distinctive role for the state—one that supports and enhances market operations rather than directing or controlling them. This "enabling state" approach is designed to complement rather than replace private enterprise.

=== Progressive capitalism in relation to power and politics ===
Progressive capitalism acknowledges the central role of power dynamics and the need to address them to achieve fairness. It focuses on limiting excessive power and addressing inequalities within economic entities and their interactions with citizens. By restraining corporate power, facilitating the entry of new firms through improved access to finance and technology, and strengthening workers' rights—including supporting unionization—progressive capitalism aims to rebalance power and counteract perceptions of a rigged system that contribute to disillusionment with democracy and the rise of populism.

Progressive capitalism addresses the critical issue of growing power imbalances, with increasing concentrations of wealth and corporate power contrasting sharply with the diminishing power and incomes of workers. A key component of progressive capitalism is its commitment to social justice, which seeks to reduce inequalities not only in income and wealth but also those arising from various forms of exploitation. Access to basic health care, considered a human right by the Universal Declaration of Human Rights, is central to this agenda. Progressive capitalism advocates for public health care provision, often complemented by private options, especially in countries with significant income and wealth disparities. In the U.S., despite the Affordable Care Act, many still lack adequate health care options. Thus, a public option, where the government provides an additional choice, is essential for enhancing competition and reducing market exploitation.

Progressive capitalism reimagines the social contract between voters, elected officials, workers, and corporations, aiming to address disparities. Stiglitz advocates for expanding public options in critical areas currently dominated by private entities or lacking sufficient provision. He highlights the missed opportunity of not including a public option in Obamacare, which could have increased choices and competition, ultimately lowering costs. By implementing such measures across sectors like retirement and mortgages, he envisions restoring a middle-class standard of living for most Americans.

In the Brandeis-Stiglitz model of progressive capitalism, the banking and finance sectors are crucial. Brandeis and Stiglitz criticize the harmful effects of finance capital when banks exceed their roles, such as by engaging in management or complex tasks beyond assessing and holding loans, leading to conflicts of interest and inefficiencies. This model also seeks to address contemporary challenges in the digital communications sector by applying foundational principles similar to those that guided the success of the second industrial revolution in America. It advocates for regulatory frameworks and guidance that foster competition and innovation within decentralized markets, as well as expert-driven policy implementation and democratic political processes to support evolving economic structures.

Joseph Stiglitz has described progressive capitalism as a "truly freeing economic and political system." Progressive capitalism advances both political and economic freedom by ensuring fair and equitable market practices. It fosters meaningful political freedom through shared prosperity and by curbing the disproportionate influence of wealth on politics. By creating a more just economic system and regulating financial power in politics, progressive capitalism seeks to protect democratic processes and enhance real freedoms for all citizens.

Progressive capitalism promotes democracy and social justice by addressing systemic power imbalances. To ensure its sustainability, capitalist interests must be prevented from distorting democratic processes. This is accomplished by promoting democratic values, safeguarding a diverse and independent press, reinforcing checks and balances across various societal sectors, and protecting the democratic system itself from practices like voter suppression and gerrymandering.

=== Progressive capitalism and neoliberalism ===
Progressive capitalism has been presented as an alternative to neoliberalism.

Stiglitz argues that the notion perpetuated by neoliberalism—that there are no viable alternatives to its policies—is fundamentally flawed. During the European debt crisis, for example, the harsh austerity measures imposed on Greece and other European countries were not the only options available. Instead, Stiglitz advocates for progressive capitalism as a viable alternative. This approach offers a different way to organize society, focusing on expanding individual opportunities and creating a fairer, more sustainable economy, in contrast to the austerity and market-driven policies of neoliberalism.

Neoliberalism and progressive capitalism: policy responses to market issues
Market failure	Neoliberal policy stance	Consequences	Progressive capitalism policies
Externalities	Deregulation; Coase theorem	Excessive pollution; financial crises	Regulation; corrective taxation; government investment in environment and public health
Public goods & coordination failures	Leave to private sector; reliance on private production	Underinvestment in education, health; slower growth	Public investments; subsidies for collective action; balanced public-private partnerships
Imperfect information	No disclosure requirements; caveat emptor	Insufficient disclosure; exploitation; reduced productivity	Disclosure requirements; regulations; liability laws; class-action suits
Imperfect risk markets	No intervention; risk consequences ignored	Lack of health insurance; high economic volatility	Social insurance; safety nets; income-contingent loans; public option
Imperfect capital markets	Denial of relevance; leave to market	High underinvestment; resource underutilization	Small-business loans; green banks; stabilizing fiscal and monetary policies
Lack of competition	Leave to market; potential competition	Market power concentration; high prices; reduced innovation	Antitrust policies; restrict mergers; public options
Excessive inequality	Leave to market or political process	Income and wealth concentration; undermined democracy; less opportunity	Pre-redistribution (e.g., minimum wages); redistribution through taxes; public expenditure programs

== Application ==
To transition from neoliberal capitalism to progressive capitalism, it is necessary to adjust the economic and legal systems by updating rules, regulations, and institutions. The specifics of progressive capitalism will vary by country, influenced by each nation's history and culture. There is no one-size-fits-all model for progressive capitalism.

Certain aspects of progressive capitalism rely on collaborations between the public and private sectors, while others require direct government investment. The economic framework increases government spending on technology, education, and infrastructure. Joseph Stiglitz asserts that the progressive capitalism agenda is highly feasible and essential to enact. He argues that the alternatives put forth by nationalists and neoliberals would only exacerbate existing issues such as stagnation, inequality, environmental degradation, and political discord, potentially resulting in undesirable outcomes. Stiglitz contends that the concept of progressive capitalism is not contradictory but rather offers a practical and dynamic alternative to failed ideologies like free-market neoliberalism.

Measures within the framework of progressive capitalism include addressing the challenges of affordability and accessibility in healthcare, by exploring innovative solutions beyond current approaches or single-payer systems, such as including public options that maintain choice while expanding coverage. For childcare, targeted measures like expanding tax credits and implementing universal paid leave can alleviate burdens and encourage family well-being. Education initiatives, including universal pre-K, affordable skilled trades and college education options, are crucial for fostering opportunity and addressing inequality. Infrastructure refurbishment is urgent, requiring significant public investment to boost economic growth and create jobs. Climate change demands comprehensive action, such as revising pollution clean-up tax, a carbon tax to help combat climate change, and investments in renewable energy, while tax reform must prioritize fairness and sustainability through measures like progressive taxation and pre-distribution reforms. The government should invest in research for clean energy solutions, implement federal standards for appliances to minimize energy waste, and encourage automakers to create more fuel-efficient vehicles while shifting towards electric options.

Progressive capitalism incorporates a greater role for collective action with private sector and government involvement. It contrasts with extremes like communism, which concentrated power excessively, and neoliberal approaches, such as those of Reagan and Thatcher, which leaned too far towards free markets with insufficient attention to social justice. The Third Way, exemplified by leaders like Clinton, Blair, and Schröder, failed to adequately address social justice concerns while embracing neoliberal policies like free trade and tax cuts for the wealthy. Collective action under progressive capitalism encompasses various forms, such as NGOs, unions, cooperatives, and conservation societies. It is essential for managing externalities, including environmental damage, which require public regulations. Effective collective action often necessitates government intervention to address free-rider problems and can be supported through subsidies to encourage voluntary participation.

Progressive capitalism relies on antitrust law to counter the dominance of large corporations, scrutinizing mergers and acquisitions, and potentially breaking up large corporations like Amazon and Facebook to ensure fair competition in the market. Richard North Patterson suggests that this approach would address the acquisition practices of tech giants like Amazon, Facebook, Google, Apple, and Microsoft, which have collectively acquired 436 companies and startups over the past decade without significant regulatory oversight. Progressive capitalism also necessitates pre-tax reforms. There are constraints, both political and economic, on the extent to which income can be redistributed through taxation and government spending alone. Predistribution, viewed as a fundamental aspect of progressive capitalism, entails reshaping economic incentives and income structures prior to taxation. Proposed measures include granting corporations a charter of corporate citizenship, allowing employee board representation, and requiring executives to hold shares for a specified period.

Another crucial element of progressive capitalism is preventing special interests from corrupting democracy. Richard North Patterson has suggested that the framework would involve strengthening the Federal Election Commission (FEC), shutting down individual super PACs, and implementing measures such as comprehensive disclosure of campaign funding sources and a public campaign-finance matching system. Steps should be taken to sever the connection between corporate lobbyists and public officials, including restrictions on stock ownership and lobbying careers and increased transparency in lobbying activities. Progressive capitalism recognizes that economic and political health are intertwined, and unchecked dominance of large private institutions can narrow opportunities, stifle competition, and undermine representative governance. By addressing these issues, progressive capitalism aims to preserve the integrity of the political and economic system and minimize the rise of extremism and authoritarianism.

Given the existential challenge of climate change, in the scope of progressive capitalism, public initiatives and regulations must prioritize the development of a sustainable economy. A crucial aspect of ensuring widespread access to a middle-class lifestyle will be the establishment of government-backed alternatives, such as public options for mortgages, retirement plans, and healthcare. Progressive capitalism advocates for addressing market failures, particularly when imperfect and asymmetric information leads to exploitation by profit-maximizers, as demonstrated by the 2008 recession. Joseph Stiglitz proposes a public mortgage option that offers standard 30-year mortgages for taxpayers of five years, based on assessments of repayment ability and property value. This option would provide flexibility, including reduced payments to avoid foreclosures during personal income drops, and utilize government efficiencies in data collection and social insurance to lower homeownership costs.

David Sainsbury advocates for a government that strengthens the civil service, implements effective regulations and codes of conduct, and promotes innovation through support for interlinked industries and regional upgrades. He describes an education system that prioritizes vocational training and STEM subjects (science, technology, engineering, and mathematics). In his vision of progressive capitalism, a proactive government focuses on creating an environment conducive to growth and opportunity, rather than reverting to outdated "command and control" methods. This approach requires significant improvements in government capabilities, including the creation of a national economic council and a more effective civil service. Sainsbury also supports state funding for political parties to mitigate the influence of financial power and ensure that governments can more effectively represent public interests.

In India, where the state traditionally plays a significant role but has recently liberalized sectors like finance and underinvested in areas such as healthcare and housing, Joseph Stiglitz has stated that he sees a substantial potential for progressive capitalism. This approach would enhance environmental regulations to address severe pollution and water issues, and ensure that billionaires contribute fairly through taxation. As India's economy grows, progressive capitalism could help the government take a more active role in creating a more equitable and sustainable society, aligning with the country's increasing capacity to support comprehensive public services and environmental protections.

== Advocates ==
New Keynesian Nobel-winning economist Joseph Stiglitz advocates for adopting progressive capitalism as a viable alternative to neoliberalism, which he considers failed and should be abandoned. He argues that progressive capitalism addresses the urgent need for systemic change, given the evident flaws of the current neoliberal system. Stiglitz claims that a majority of Americans support the values and policies of progressive capitalism and proposes to counteract the worsening environmental degradation and threats to democratic principles caused by unfettered capitalism.

U.S. Congressman Ro Khanna identifies himself as a "progressive capitalist" and argues that progressives should promote wealth generation as part of their agenda. He defines the framework as prioritizing significant investments in every American and creating equitable opportunities for value generation. He advocates for a vision where progressive capitalism ensures broad access to healthcare, education, and basic support systems, which he views as essential for individuals to reach their full potential. According to Khanna, progressive capitalism promotes the benefits of free markets—such as innovation and entrepreneurship—while ensuring that markets serve the common good and address inequalities. He highlights the importance of a well-distributed, well-paying job market and supports practical applications of progressive capitalism, such as technology companies investing in disadvantaged communities. Khanna calls for a shift from unfettered capitalism to a progressive capitalist model that re-centers the American dream for the working class. As a progressive capitalist, he advocates for democratizing access to technology as a way to reinvigorate the innovative spirit of the American economy. His book Dignity in a Digital Age outlines his vision of progressive capitalism.

In his 2013 book Progressive Capitalism: How to Achieve Economic Growth, Liberty and Social Justice, David Sainsbury, a former Minister of State for Science, Research and Innovation, advocates for a new progressive capitalism that he believes should replace the neoliberal one. The suggested framework is one where rapid growth is driven by market-supporting institutions within an enabling state. This contrasts with the market-directing institutions of a command-and-control state or the minimal state with its weak institutions. His key recommendations include establishing a Shareholders Advisory Board to protect investors, raising thresholds for takeovers, and ensuring R&D funds drive innovation. He also proposes regional technology initiatives, enhanced technician training, improved careers advice in schools, and the formation of a National Economic Council to coordinate economic reform. Sainsbury also suggests reforming political finance by limiting donations and increasing public support for political parties.

Political commentator Richard North Patterson argues that progressive capitalism is essential to avoiding the dangers posed by extreme voices on both the left and right. He refers to historical precedents showing that societies cannot develop politically, economically, or spiritually when the majority of their people are struggling.

Patrick Diamond and Roger Liddle argue for a model of progressive capitalism that contrasts sharply with both the "command and control" approach of traditional socialism and the minimalist stance of neo-liberalism. They advocate for a government that supports economic institutions and fosters long-term investment while avoiding direct market intervention. This vision includes investing in infrastructure, promoting vocational education and STEM fields, and reforming financial and political systems to support inclusive growth.

== Criticism ==
Economist Max B. Sawicky critiques Joseph Stiglitz's progressive capitalism for its focus on incremental reforms rather than addressing fundamental market issues. While Stiglitz's proposals, like enhanced Social Security and public mortgage options, aim to improve existing systems and reduce exploitation, Sawicky argues they do not confront the deeper structural problems of capitalism. He suggests that Stiglitz's approach remains within social-democratic reform and overlooks the potential for more radical solutions, such as social ownership and comprehensive economic planning, which he believes could more effectively address systemic issues and leverage public sector capabilities.

== See also ==
- Benefit corporation
- Binary economics
- Community capitalism
- Corporate social responsibility
- Creating shared value
- Economic progressivism
- Green capitalism
- Humanistic capitalism
- Inclusive capitalism
- Inclusive growth
- Neo-capitalism
- Social democracy
