= King Charles N. Lambert =

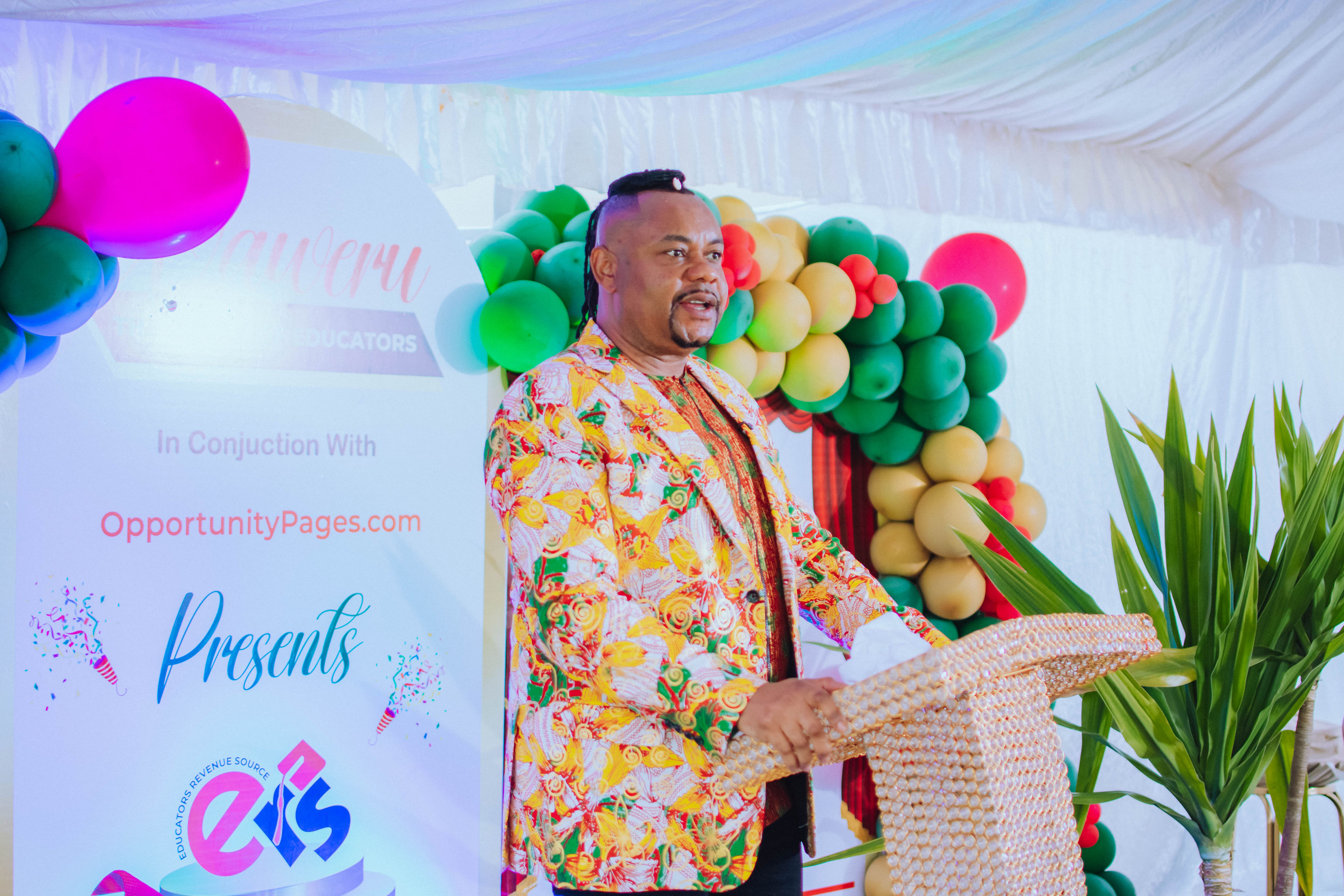
- Born: 5 October 1973 (age 52); Lagos State, Nigeria
- Occupations: Entrepreneur; Pan-African Economic Activist
- Spouse: Caroline Lambert
- Children: 8

King Charles N. Lambert is a Pan-African economic activist, entrepreneur, and founder of the Compassionate Capitalism model and The Black Wall Street platform.

== Early life and education ==
Nicknamed "The African Oracle", Lambert was born on October 5, 1973, in Lagos State, Nigeria. He is married to Caroline Lambert, and they have eight children.

== Career ==
Lambert is the King of Black Wall Street (BWS). The BWS implements the ancient Hebrew Monarchy style of leadership. He developed the Compassionate Capitalism Economic System (CCES), an economic model that combines traditional capitalism with social responsibility, in 2002. The system is based on the principle that consumers can also function as investors, allowing everyday economic activities, such as purchasing goods and services, to contribute to investment and development.

Other African-focused projects launched by Lambert include:

- Pan African CEO Forum
- Pan African Job Centres
- Youth empowerment schemes
- The Redirect Mall
- Afrowood

He has also authored a number of books to further his Pan-African movement, including When the Samba Broke, which blends the power of storytelling with the call for liberation and transformation. His second book, Wait Until Dawn, was described by critics as being on a par with widely acclaimed literary works of Ola Rotimi, The Gods Are Not to be Blame, and Nigerian Nobel Laureate, Wole Soyinka's King's Horseman.
