= 1989 New York City Council presidential election =

- November 5, 1989
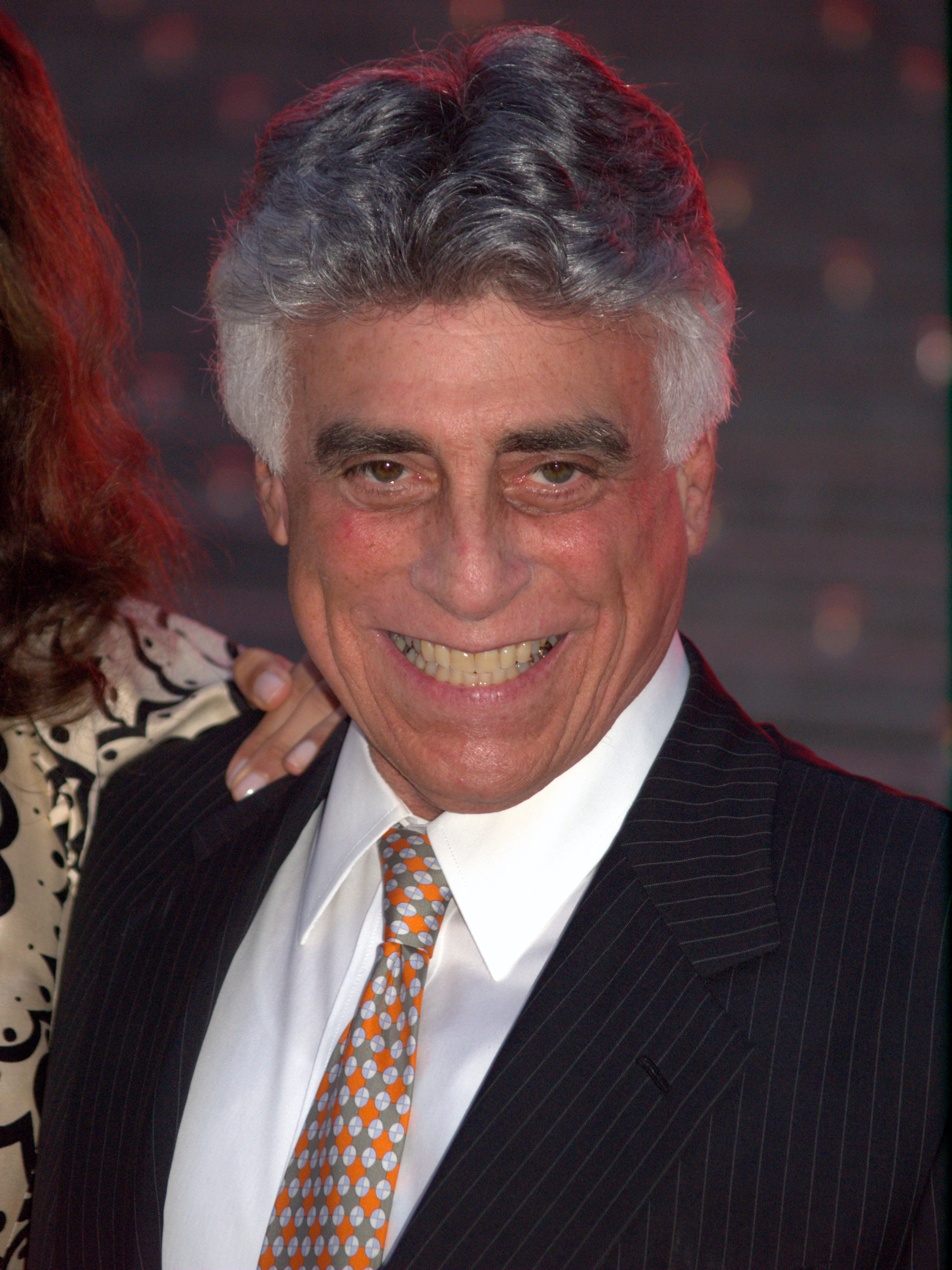

Nominee	Andrew Stein	Richard F. Birmginham Sr.
Party	Democratic	Conservative
Alliance	Liberal
Popular vote	1,207,493	70,206
Percentage	92.6%	5.4%
President of the City Council before election
Andrew Stein
Democratic
Elected President of the City Council
Andrew Stein
Democratic

An election was held on November 5, 1989 to elect the President of the New York City Council. Democratic incumbent Andrew Stein was re-elected to a second term in office over token opposition in the Democratic primary and general election.

This was the final election for New York City Council President, as the office was split into the offices of New York City Public Advocate and Speaker of the New York City Council following the 1993 elections.

== Democratic primary ==
=== Candidates ===
- Rafael Mendez, Bronx psychologist and member of the New Alliance Party
- Andrew Stein, incumbent City Council President

=== Campaign ===
The New Alliance Party put forward Rafael Mendez as a candidate, seeking to exploit ethnic divisions in the city. With David Dinkins challenging Ed Koch in the concurrent mayoral primary, New Alliance Party members unsuccessfully demanded that Dinkins endorse Mendez to demonstrate his support for the city's Hispanic community. Mendez was critical of "big-money interests that control the political process."

The New York Times endorsed Stein on August 31, claiming Mendez had not "run a credible campaign."

=== Results ===
1989 Democratic Council President primary (unofficial)
Party	Candidate	Votes	%
Democratic	Andrew Stein (incumbent)	593,101	75.37%
Democratic	Rafael Mendez	193,842	24.63%
Total votes		786,943	100.00%

== General election ==
=== Candidates ===
- Richard F. Birmingham Sr., Staten Island attorney and special counsel to the Council minority leader (Conservative)
- Barbara Bollaert (Right to Life)
- Clay Conrad (Libertarian)
- Jerrry Freiwerth (Socialist Workers)
- Rafael Mendez, Bronx psychologist (New Alliance)
- Andrew Stein, incumbent City Council President since 1986 (Democratic and Liberal)

=== Campaign ===
Without a Republican opponent in the general election, Stein was considered assured of re-election, setting him up to run for mayor in 1989 or thereafter. A week before the election, Stein admitted, "I'm not doing the kind of campaigning I would do in a real race. ... Obviously, I have an interest in becoming mayor some day."

=== Results ===
1989 New York City Council President election (unofficial)
Party	Candidate	Votes	%
Democratic	Andrew Stein (incumbent)	1,207,493	92.58%
Conservative	Richard F. Birmingham Sr.	70,206	5.38%
Right to Life	Barbara Bollaert	20,093	1.54%
Total votes		1,304,231	100.00%
