= Economic progressivism =

Political and economic philosophy

Economic progressivism or fiscal progressivism is a political and economic philosophy incorporating the socioeconomic principles of social democrats and political progressives. These views are often rooted in the concept of social justice and have the goal of improving the human condition through government regulation, social protections and the maintenance of public goods. It is not to be confused with the more general idea of progress in relation to economic growth.

Economic progressivism is based on the idea that capitalist markets left to operate with limited government regulation are inherently unfair, favoring big business, large corporations and the wealthy. Progressives believe that a fair market should result in a normal distribution of wealth, but in most countries the wealthy earn heavily disproportionate incomes. Hence, progressives advocate controlling the markets through public protections that they believe will favor upward mobility, diminish income inequality and reverse marginalization. Specific economic policies that are considered progressive include progressive taxes, income redistribution aimed at reducing inequalities of wealth, a comprehensive package of public services, universal health care, resisting involuntary unemployment, public education, social security, minimum wage laws, antitrust laws, legislation protecting workers' rights and the rights of trade unions and a welfare state.

The progressive economic philosophy is typically defined in opposition to economic liberalism, laissez-faire and the conclusions of Austrian and Chicago economics. Many organizations that promote economic progressivism can be characterized from a range of applying criticism of capitalism to being anti-capitalist and include principles and policies based on Keynesianism, Marxism and other left-wing schools of socioeconomic thought. Economic progressivism can also be seen as a potential response to and treatment of social and economic problems such as affluenza, environmental justice, inverted totalitarianism, market fundamentalism, wage slavery, and "socialism for the rich and capitalism for the poor" as well as a counter-argument to the culture of capitalism, trickle-down economics, and rugged individualism.

== Overview ==
Economic progressivism is compounded with the larger political progressive movement that emerged in the Western World during the late 19th century and early 20th century. During this time, the movement and its ideas directly confronted the laissez-faire economics and increasing socioeconomic inequality that characterised society. The term economic progressivism, especially while describing policies of progressive taxation, social welfare and general leftist economic measures, finds particular resonance in the parlance of the United States compared to rest of the world. Nations in Europe developed social welfare systems either by social-democratic governments or by more right-wing governments as concessions to pacify the population from moving further towards the left. Meanwhile, less developed countries and postcolonial nations in Africa and Asia developed a tradition of social welfare systems being implemented to aid the population develop across social and economic indices. The development of economic progressivism has been markedly different across different parts of the world.

=== In Europe ===
Progressive economic policies in Europe have a slightly longer history and many of the policies are not explicitly termed as "progressive politics". In Britain, England and Wales had the English Poor Laws in place since the 16th century. The laws existed under various period undergoing several modifications until the 20th century, when the Liberal Party implemented several welfare reforms across the country. The Liberal welfare reforms from 1906 to 1914 strengthened labour laws and the position of trade unions, expanded education and introduced a pension system for the elderly, among other things. In Germany, chancellor Otto von Bismarck created the first comprehensive welfare state in modern industrial society. To curb the influence of socialism and to appease the working-class population, Bismarck employed State Socialism and implemented a series of laws during the 1880s and 1890s. These included the Workers Protection Act, the Health Insurance Bill, the Accident Insurance Bill and the Old Age and Disability Insurance Bill, all designed to increase the welfare of the newly create German nation state.

Progressive economic policies in terms of the welfare state expanded significantly across Europe in the post-World War II period. This manifested in the domestic politics in those countries. In Germany, one had the struggle between left-leaning Social Democrats and the right-leaning Christian Democrats. In the United Kingdom, the struggle was between Labour on the left and the Conservatives on the right. The welfare state and policies such as progressive taxation emerged throughout Europe. Scandinavian nations became exemplary in introducing steep rates of progressive taxation and extensive welfare schemes as part of their Nordic model. However, the rise of neoliberal free-market economics led to a decline in progressive economics towards the end of the 20th century, particularly in the United Kingdom, where the premiership of Margaret Thatcher saw the dismantling of powerful trade unions, reduction of government expenditure and increased privatisation in the 1980s which continued throughout he 1990s.

The aftermath of the Great Recession saw the resurgence of a demand for a return to increased government expenditure. The anti-austerity movement that emerged during the Great Recession in Europe saw countries such as Greece, Spain and the United Kingdom. Like the Occupy Wall Street movement across the Atlantic, people started protesting government response to the financial meltdown which involved cutting down of government spending to manage budget deficits. This involved cutting spending on measures such as healthcare, education and other social welfare benefits.

=== In the United States ===
In the United States, the term progressive is often contrasted with neoliberal free-market ideology. The progressive movement emerged during the 1890s and 1920s in the so-called Progressive Era. Within this larger political movement tackling corruption and social inequalities was the introduction of economic policies that aimed to neutralise the worst excess of capitalism. This era was marked by the growth of labour unions such as the American Federation of Labour, the expansion of labour rights, the establishment of antitrust laws targeting major monopolistic firms and industries and an increase in taxation of the upper class. Progressive economic policies emerged as a response to the excessive big business power and the concentration of wealth and power amongst a very small fraction of society during the Gilded Age. This period introduced many landmark economic policies, including the introduction of an income tax in 1913. The estate tax also introduced in 1897, first in the state of New York. By 1924, estates valued at more than $10 million were taxed a rate of 40%. However, the structural legacy of slavery entrenched racial hierarchies within the American labor force. These hierarchies created a segmented labor market in which access to employment, wages, and social mobility was distributed along racial lines. This fragmentation contributed to divergent and sometimes conflicting political interests within the working class, undermining efforts at cross-racial class solidarity. As a result, the development of a unified left-wing political movement in the United States was constrained. Racial stratification also limited public support for redistributive policies—such as taxation, welfare programs, and income equality—reducing the political viability of economic progressivism in the American context.

During the Great Depression in the 1930s, Democratic President Franklin D. Roosevelt's administration created the New Deal programme. The government become heavily involved in stimulating economic growth through increased expenditure, following Keynesian economic policies of using fiscal policy through government subsidies and investment in various industries like infrastructure, agriculture and commodities to provide to increase economic output. The Great Depression in the United States was marked by massive unemployment and poverty. The New Deal programme provided jobs through investment in many large infrastructure projects such as housing, transport infrastructure, civil administration and farming. There was also the creation of government departments such as the Public Works Administration to oversee government activity in industry. From then until the late 1960s, with Democratic President Lyndon B. Johnson's Great Society program, there was significant government activity in investing in industries, education, healthcare and general social welfare of the population. During the presidency of Republican Ronald Reagan in the 1980s, neoliberal free-market economics came back into prominence in government policy. This period was characterised by increasing privatisation in industries, healthcare and education. It was also marked by a decrease in taxation of businesses and a decrease in government reliance of fiscal policy, with increasing use of monetary policy instead.

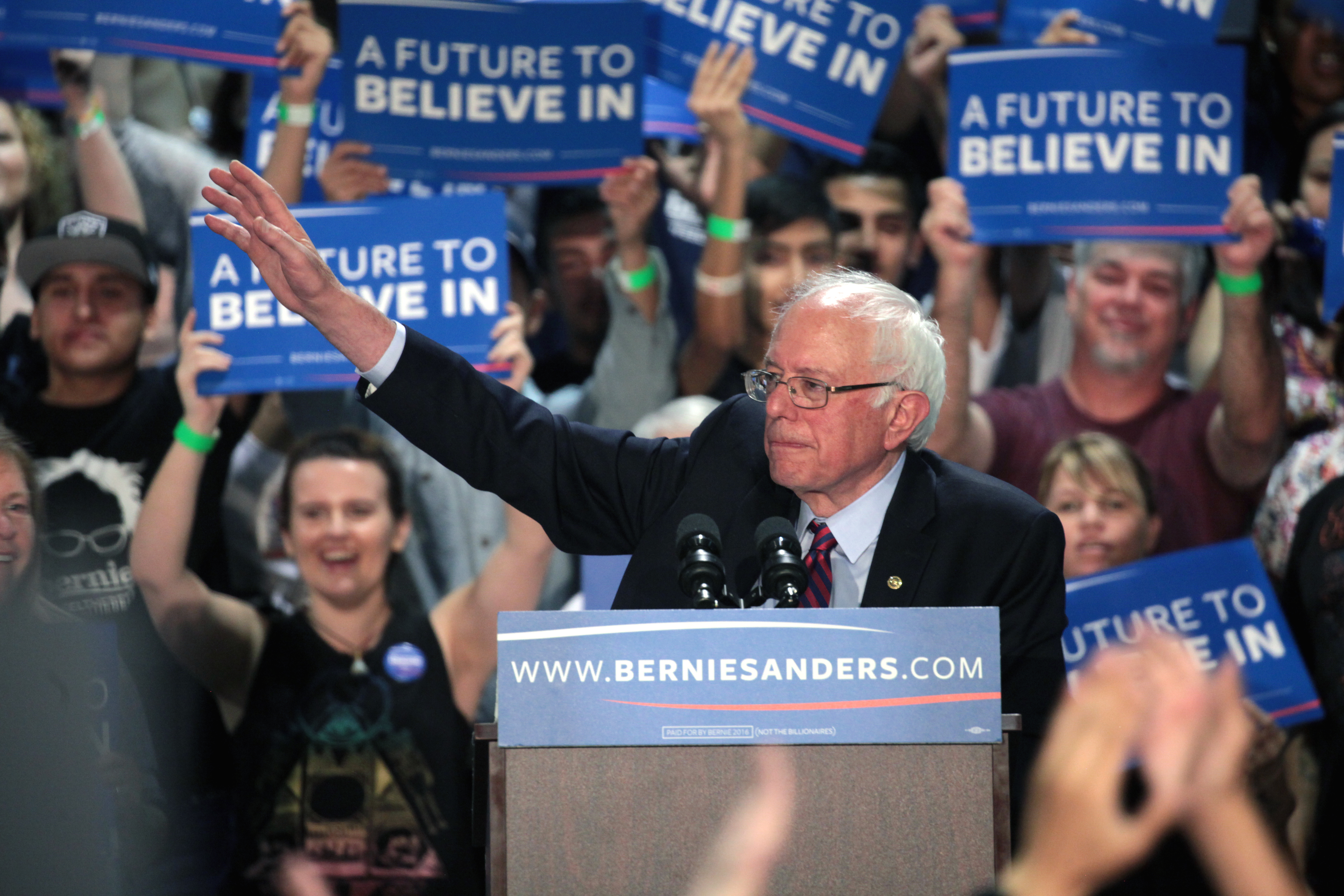
U.S. Senator Bernie Sanders speaking with supporters at the Agriculture Center at the Arizona State Fairgrounds in Phoenix, Arizona in 2016.

Progressive economics—also known as New Progressive Economics—made a comeback in the United States to the forefront public discourse after the Great Recession of the late 2000s. Popular dissatisfaction with government policies favouring big business and the bailout of banks led to the emergence of the Occupy Wall Street movement. Subsequently, Vermont Senator Bernie Sanders and his policies of progressive taxation, universal healthcare for all (Medicare for All) and free higher education, amongst others, also gained prominence across the country. Sanders, who ran for the Democratic presidential nomination in both the 2016 and 2020 presidential primaries, lost out to his rivals in securing the nomination. However, his policies have seen a rise in popularity and mainstream acceptance within the time period. Since then, many other politicians from the Democratic Party advocating progressive economic policies begun to gain prominence nationally. Among them are Senator Elizabeth Warren, who also sought to win the 2020 democratic presidential nomination, along with members of the Congressional Progressive Caucus. Even some in the Republican Party have advocated for economic progressivism (but using populist and traditionalist rather than social justice rhetoric).

== See also ==
- Criticism of capitalism
- Democratic socialism
- Economics
- Kirchnerism
- Liberal socialism
- New Deal
- Nordic model
- Progressive capitalism
- Social democracy
- Welfare state
