= E2M =

E2M is a free market, economic model community capitalism, which aims to help local communities create sustainable citizen controlled wealth to address their socioeconomic and environmental problems and create opportunities for people.

The model's inventors believe that the current economic system is unsustainable, because they believe it exists to produce maximum profits and ever increasing growth for a minority of investors on a planet with limited resources. They assert that growth is driven by consumer purchases which result in ever increasing debt on the populace, ever decreasing resources, unending production of waste, and excessive industrial activity that the group believes leads to global warming.

Under the E2M model, regional communities would share in the equity of corporations which are then patronized by community members, thus creating income streams to the E2M Regional Economic Councils (E2M-REC) which would act in the best interests of the regional community. Wealth earned by the community under E2M would then be invested in additional business start-ups in which the E2M-RECs own even more equity. E2M.org is the organization that charters the E2M Regional Economic Councils. These councils are independent of E2M.org and each other, yet may collaborate to develop broader initiatives where necessary to address national and international issues. The group asserts that as the community wealth held by the E2M-RECs grows, investments in businesses will increase as well as social investments which might include mortgages of 50 year terms and 1 percent interest rates, purchases of commercial and residential real estate to be rented at stable rates over decades, and other investments based on the goal of achieving adequate profits and sustainable growth for the common good. The group states that this would counterbalance the traditional investment goal of maximum profits and maximum growth for the private investor, which they believe to be an unsustainable investment criterion that endangers the planet and its inhabitants.

== The economic model ==
E2M is designed to enable local communities to create the wealth necessary to address their socioeconomic and environmental problems.

The E2M.org economic model consists of three main groups:

1. The E2M Regional Economic Council (E2M-REC) - a 24-member body composed of community representatives, tasked with managing the funds to serve the best interests of the regional community.
2. The Community - the geographically defined economic community
3. E2M Certified Businesses - companies that sign an agreement with their local E2M-REC, which outlines their economic commitment to the E2M-REC and what benefits they can expect from E2M certification.

=== Board of directors ===
E2M.org was founded on January 1, 2000, by Michael Garjian, an entrepreneur from western Massachusetts. The E2M.org board includes:

- Michael Garjian, founder, E2M.org
- Benjamin Swan, MA state representative, 12th Hampden District
- Jason Garand, regional council organizer, Springfield Office, New England Regional Council of Carpenters
- David Bisson, treasurer, E2M.org
- Mary Westervelt, director of marketing, CAIA Association
