= Economic liberalism =

Political and economic ideology

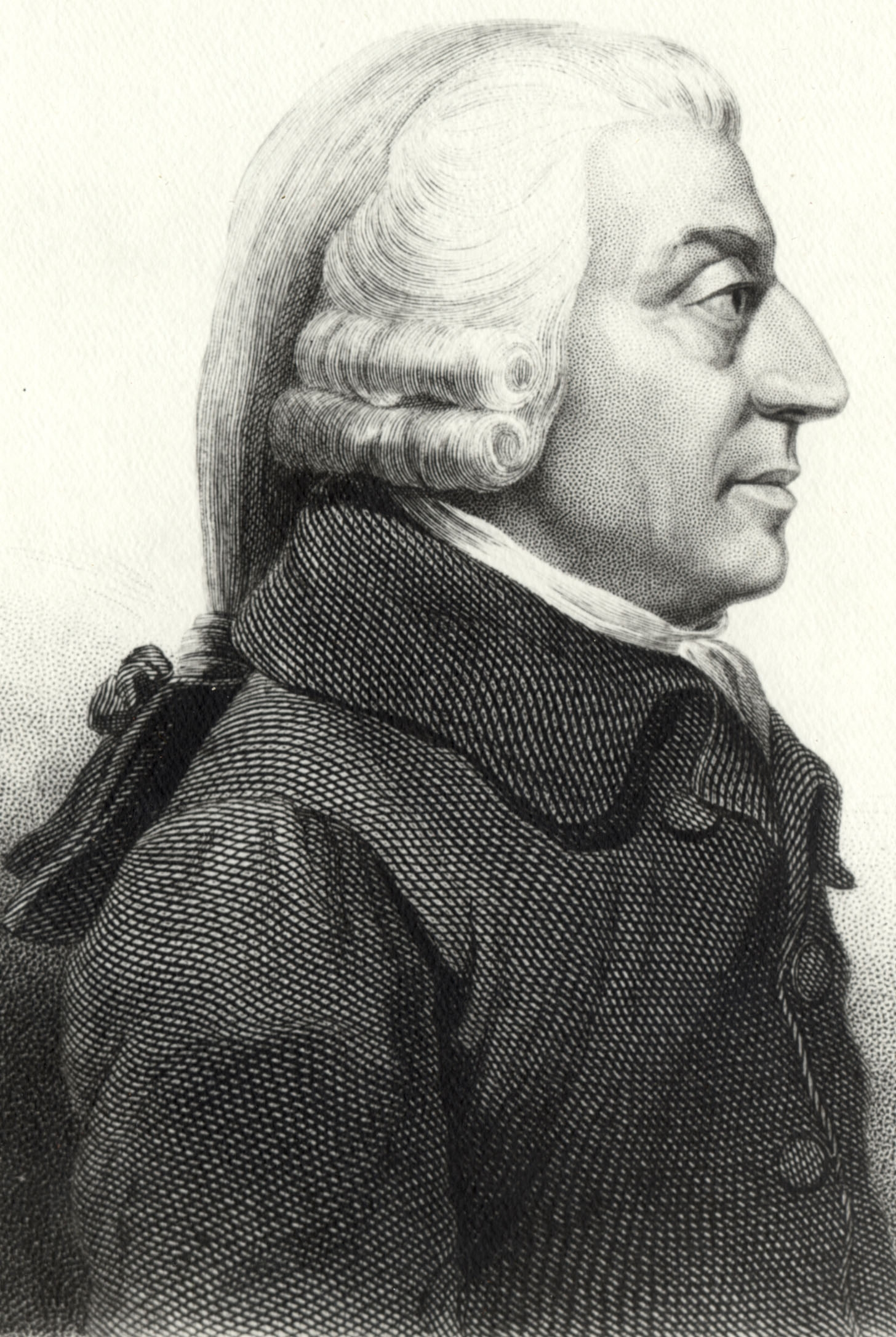
Adam Smith was an early advocate for economic liberalism.

Economic liberalism is a political and economic ideology that supports a market economy based on individualism and private property in the means of production. Adam Smith is considered one of the primary initial writers on economic liberalism, and his writing is generally regarded as representing the economic expression of 19th-century liberalism up until the Great Depression and rise of Keynesianism in the 20th century. Historically, economic liberalism arose in response to feudalism and mercantilism.

Economic liberalism is associated with markets and private ownership of capital assets. Economic liberals tend to oppose government intervention and protectionism in the market economy when it inhibits free trade and competition, but tend to support government intervention where it protects property rights, opens new markets or funds market growth, and resolves market failures. They also tend to oppose cartels, monopolies, financialization of the economy, rent-seeking behaviour and unproductive classes reliant on rent, assets or state-granted privileges. An economy that is managed according to these precepts may be described as a liberal economy or operating under liberal capitalism. Economic liberals commonly adhere to a political and economic philosophy that advocates a restrained fiscal policy and a balanced budget through measures such as low taxes, reduced government spending, and minimized government debt. Free trade, deregulation, tax cuts, privatization, labour market flexibility, and opposition to trade unions are also common positions.

Economic liberalism can be contrasted with protectionism because of its support for free trade and an open economy, and is considered opposed to planned economies and non-capitalist economic orders, such as communism. As such, economic liberalism today is associated with classical liberalism, neoliberalism, right-libertarianism, and some schools of conservatism like liberal conservatism and fiscal conservatism. Economic liberalism follows the same philosophical approach as classical liberalism and fiscal conservatism.

== Origin and early history ==
Developed during the Age of Enlightenment, particularly by Adam Smith, economic liberalism was born as the theory of economics of liberalism, which advocates minimal interference by government in the economy. Arguments in favor of economic liberalism were advanced by Smith and others during the age of enlightenment, opposing feudalism and mercantilism. It was first proposed by Adam Smith in An Inquiry into the Nature and Causes of the Wealth of Nations (1776), which advocated minimal interference of government in a market economy, although it did not necessarily oppose the state's provision of basic public goods. In Smith's view, if everyone is left to his own economic devices instead of being controlled by the state, the result would be a harmonious and more equal society of ever-increasing prosperity. This underpinned the move towards a capitalist economic system in the late 18th century and the subsequent demise of the mercantilist system. Private property and individual contracts form the basis of economic liberalism.

The early theory of economic liberalism was based on the assumption that the economic actions of individuals are largely based on self-interest (invisible hand) and that allowing them to act without any restrictions will produce the best results for everyone (spontaneous order), provided that at least minimum standards of public information and justice exist, so that no one is allowed to coerce, steal, or commit fraud, and there should be freedom of speech and press. This ideology was well reflected in English law; Lord Ackner, denying the existence of a duty of good faith in English contract law, emphasised the "adversarial position of the parties when involved in negotiations".

=== Initial opposition ===
Initially, the economic liberals had to contend with arguments from the supporters of feudal privileges for the wealthy, traditions of the aristocracy and the rights of monarchs to run national economies in their own personal interests. By the end of the 19th century and the beginning of the 20th century, this opposition was largely defeated in the primary capital markets of Western countries.

The Ottoman Empire had liberal free trade policies by the 18th century, with origins in capitulations of the Ottoman Empire, dating back to the first commercial treaties signed with France in 1536 and taken further with capitulations in 1673, in 1740 which lowered duties to only 3% for imports and exports and in 1790. Ottoman free trade policies were praised by British economists advocating free trade such as J. R. McCulloch in his Dictionary of Commerce (1834), but criticized by British politicians opposing free trade such as Prime Minister Benjamin Disraeli, who cited the Ottoman Empire as "an instance of the injury done by unrestrained competition" in the 1846 Corn Laws debate, arguing that it destroyed what had been "some of the finest manufactures of the world" in 1812.

== Contrast with other economic philosophies ==
=== Contrast between British and American views ===
Historian Kathleen G. Donohue argues that classical liberalism in the United States during the 19th century had distinctive characteristics as opposed to Britain: "[A]t the center of classical liberal theory [in Europe] was the idea of laissez-faire. To the vast majority of American classical liberals, however, laissez-faire did not mean no government intervention at all. On the contrary, they were more than willing to see government provide tariffs, railroad subsidies, and internal improvements, all of which benefited producers. What they condemned was intervention in behalf of consumers."

=== Limits of influence and influence on other perspectives ===
In its initial formation, economic liberalism was focused on promoting the idea of private ownership and trade; however, due to a growing awareness of concerns regarding policy, the rise of economic liberalism paved the way for a new form of liberalism, known as social liberalism. This promoted an accommodation for government intervention in order to help the poor. As subsequent authors picked up and promoted widespread appeal of a subset of Smith's economic theories to support their own work—of free trade, the division of labour, and the principle of individual initiative—this contributed to obscuring other aspects of the rich body of political liberalism to be found in Smith's work. For example, his work promoted the ideal that the everyday man could hold ownership of his own property and trade, which Smith felt would slowly allow for individuals to take control of their places within society.

=== Economic liberalism and fiscal liberalism (conservatism) ===
Economic liberalism is a much broader concept than fiscal liberalism, which is called fiscal conservatism or economic libertarianism in the United States. The ideology that highlighted the financial aspect of economic liberalism is called fiscal liberalism, which is defined as support for free trade.

=== Position on state interventionism ===
Economic liberals oppose government intervention in the economy when it leads to outcomes they consider to be inefficient. They are supportive of a strong state that protects the right to property and enforces contracts. They may also support government interventions to resolve market failures. Ordoliberalism and various schools of social liberalism based on classical liberalism include a broader role for the state but do not seek to replace private enterprise and the free market with public enterprise and economic planning. A social market economy is a largely free-market economy based on a free price system and private property that is supportive of government activity to promote competition in markets and social welfare programs to address social inequalities that result from market outcomes.

== See also ==
- Conservatism in the United States
- Constitutional economics
- Doux commerce
- Economic freedom
- Economic liberalization
- Economic progressivism
- Georgism
- Laissez-faire
- Libertarianism in the United States

== Bibliography ==
- Adams, Ian (2001). Political Ideology Today. Manchester University Press. ISBN 978-0719060205.
- Balaam, David N; Dillman, Bradford (2015). Introduction to International Political Economy. Routledge. ISBN 978-1317347309.
- Butler, Eamonn (2015). Classical Liberalism – A Primer. Do Sustainability. ISBN 978-0255367080.
- Turner, Rachel S. (2008). Neo-Liberal Ideology: History, Concepts and Policies. Edinburgh University Press. ISBN 978-0748688685.
