= Sustainable capitalism =

Capitalism based on sustainable practices

Sustainable capitalism is a conceptual form of capitalism based on sustainable practices that seek to preserve humanity and the planet, while reducing externalities and bearing a resemblance of capitalist economic policy. A capitalistic economy must expand to survive and find new markets to support this expansion. Capitalist systems are often destructive to the environment as well as certain individuals without access to proper representation. However, sustainability provides quite the opposite; it implies not only a continuation, but a replenishing of resources. Sustainability is often thought of to be related to environmentalism, and sustainable capitalism applies sustainable principles to economic governance and social aspects of capitalism as well.

The importance of sustainable capitalism has been more recently recognized, but the concept is not new. Changes to the current economic model would have heavy social environmental and economic implications and require the efforts of individuals, as well as compliance of local, state and federal governments. Controversy surrounds the concept as it requires an increase in sustainable practices and a marked decrease in current consumptive behaviors.

This is a concept of capitalism described in Al Gore and David Blood’s manifesto for generation investment management to describe a long-term political, economic and social structure which would mitigate current threats to the planet and society. According to their manifesto, sustainable capitalism would integrate the environmental, social and governance (ESG) aspects into risk assessment in attempt to limit externalities. Most of the ideas they list are related to economic changes, and social aspects, but strikingly few are explicitly related to any environmental policy change.

== Governance and economic aspects ==
Economic aspects are clearest, perhaps because the economy is most easily associated with capitalism. Sustainable capitalism, as a policy outline, is an attempt to address and tackle the use of admittedly insufficient tools used today to measure the economic growth and the real value of countries, such as GDP or GO. Criticism of this form of growth measurement is centered on the fact that GDP fails to account for labor conditions and other environmental factors which have a long-term influence on the value which it measures.

This concept follows recent trends that see forms of sustainable business as the preferred method for development, because of the way that these types of businesses offer a positive influence to their environment. Many of these stem from business-led corporate responsibility coalitions which aim to mitigate ESG impacts through mobilization of resources. These business are not limited to the traditional non-profits we associate with corporate responsibility, but also can be independent, non-profit, for-profit, led by a board of directors or core-funded. The wide spectrum of business types shows the gradual turn towards socially and environmentally responsible corporate governance.

Sustainable capitalism challenges the common model of the capitalist economy by its linear frame. Raw materials, either natural resources or intellect, when combined with a capital increasing mechanism, like worker power, create marketable products that are sold for money and waste. In the concept of sustainable capitalism, it appears to be necessary to shift to a more circular economy where the end product would be reinvested not only to the capitalist business or financial institution but into the basis for raw materials, and people who support this business.

This type of circular economy would require more responsibility on corporate governance to reduce externalities. China has made advances in this area, increasing renewable energy industries, with an estimate that fossil fuels will no longer be the main source of energy by 2030; these steps toward change were forced in part by high pollution and population.

In their manifesto, Gore and Blood propose key economic measures to change from the current form of capitalism:.

1. Identify and incorporate risks from stranded assets.
2. Mandate integrated reporting.
3. End the default practice of issuing quarterly earnings guidance.
4. Align compensation structures with long-term sustainable performance.
5. Encourage long-term investing with loyalty-driven securities.
6. Reinforce sustainability as a fiduciary issue.
7. Create advisory services for sustainable asset management.
8. Expand the range and depth of sustainable investment products.
9. Reconsider the appropriate definition for growth beyond GDP.
10. Integrate sustainability into business education at all levels.

The first five items are most related to economic changes, while the last five are actions more related to social aspects. Of these ten, only two are directly related to environmental aspects, and none explicitly suggest environmental policy changes.

== Environmental aspects ==
As explained by Bruce Ledewitz, sustainable capitalism is the adoption and development of sustainable practices that protect natural resources, instead of spending it as capital. Ledewitz claims that in traditional capitalism, natural capital", meaning natural resources, will continue to decline and will limit monetary capital success, lifting the value of natural resources and replacing the definition of prosperity. He proposes that sustainable capitalism would institute policies and regulations to protect natural resources in addition to investing back into the environment in attempt to reverse the degradation.

== Social aspects ==
Social aspects of sustainable capitalism involve a positive reception toward climate change. Author Mohan Munasinghe explains that two specific ways that humans can respond to climate change are through adaptation and mitigation. First, adaptation is aimed at reducing the vulnerability of human and natural systems in the face of climate change stresses, while mitigation is aimed at lowering or removing greenhouse gas emissions to reduce radiative forcing of the atmosphere and the intensity of future climate change.

Economist John Ikerd claims that environmental degradation happens under modern capitalism because the economy is divorced from ethics. According to him, classical economists like Adam Smith had always intended for market economics to be tempered by property owners' moralities, and neoclassical economists put undue faith in the ability of markets to automatically adjust to physical and moral imperatives. Ikerd concludes that a system of environmental regulations founded on a popular, ethical consensus is necessary and sufficient to prevent excessive climate change.

Sustainable capitalism is also viewed as a non-transcendent, regulated commodity to humanity due to the ever-increasing demands of environmental regulation. Geoffrey Strickland emphasizes that current discussions on economic development are led by the notion that human reproduction is a commodity that must be regulated and improved to encourage market efficiency, which is a phenomenon that counteracts the growth of capitalism.

== Criticism ==
=== Marxist view ===
According to the Marxist understanding of capitalism as production for profit, it is impossible to prioritize environmental sustainability without abolishing capitalism. Ernest Mandel claims that when profit maximization requires a business to pollute the air, "the simple right to clean air is abolished". Under his conception of capitalism, profit necessarily subjugates the environment, and properly accounting for the social costs of production requires some form of socialist planning. Any attempt to adequately protect the environment within such a capitalist framework is doomed to fail, so the argument goes, because society simply is not structured to be willing to sacrifice private profits for public endeavors on this scale.

=== Sustainable capitalism as an oxymoron ===
The Capital Institute describes the concept of sustainable capitalism as an oxymoron. They argue that modern capitalism is not designed for cooperation and much of the proposed measures in the manifesto are insufficient. Regeneration, cooperation, and well-being are aspects of sustainability that do not coincide with what capitalism has evolved to be. Efforts may be made to reform current capitalistic practices, but mass movements focusing on environmental concerns that do not create a radical change of the system are not likely to succeed as they go against what capitalism was designed to achieve. Capitalism and sustainability are mutually exclusive ideas given the current model.

=== Government reluctance ===
Critics such as Neil E. Harrison argue that the government would likely be resistant to sustainable changes for the current capitalist model. Since the capitalist government was built upon capitalist ideals and business interests, he argues, the government is dependent on the system. Often, the government is most focused on overt crises rather than long-term solutions to problems that are not readily apparent. His main argument is that beyond the current structure, authority is not enough to control the social and economic aspects enough to truly impact the environmental needs.

== See also ==
- Accumulation by dispossession – Policies to centralize wealth and power
- Analytical Marxism – School of Marxist theory
- Anti-capitalism – Political ideology and movement opposed to capitalism
- Broad measures of economic progress
- Conscious business – Business concept
- Eco-capitalism – The view that capital exists in nature as "natural capital"
- Green gross domestic product – Gross domestic product with environmental consequences factored in
- Humanistic capitalism – Philosophy merging secular humanism with liberal capitalism
- Inclusive capitalism – Theoretical concept and policy movement
- Social capital – Networks of relationships among people who live and work in a particular society
- State capitalism – Ownership or control of an economy by a government
- Sustainability measurement – Quantitbasis for the informed management of sustainability
