= Council for Inclusive Capitalism =

Global non-profit organization

The Council for Inclusive Capitalism (often styled "with the Vatican") is a global non‑profit organization launched in December 2020 to promote a more equitable and sustainable economic system. The Council's founders say it aims to harness private-sector resources and influence to build a "fairer, more inclusive, and sustainable economic foundation" for society. Pope Francis and Cardinal Peter Turkson (Prefect of the Vatican's Dicastery for Promoting Integral Human Development) were involved in the founding of the Council.

== Founding ==
The idea of the Council emerged from earlier Vatican-business dialogue. In 2016, dozens of CEOs met with Pope Francis at a Fortune-Time Global Forum in Rome to discuss social and environmental issues. That initiative led to a working group on inclusive capitalism. In a Vatican audience on 11 November 2019, Francis addressed these business leaders, urging an economic system that is "fair, trustworthy and capable of addressing the most profound challenges" and commending efforts to make capitalism more inclusive. However, according to other sources, the organization dates back to a meeting between the City of London Corporation and the investment firm EL Rothschild in 2014, based on a concept developed by the Henry Jackson Society.

The Council was formally launched on 8 December 2020. Businesswoman Lynn Forrester de Rothschild served as founder and first CEO. Its launch statement – issued as a partnership with the Vatican – notes that it is "an effort led by some of the world's largest investment and business leaders," and emphasizes "the urgency of joining moral and market imperatives to reform capitalism". Business leaders such as Mastercard's CEO Ajay Banga, Salesforce's Marc Benioff, DuPont's Edward Breen, and Sharan Burrow of the International Trade Union Confederation were among the founding "Guardians" named at launch. The companies represented have assets under management of over $10 trillion and around 200 million employees worldwide. Pope Francis provided "moral guidance" for the Council.

== Goals and activities ==
The Council's guiding principles stress that companies should create "long-term value for all stakeholders", including employees, communities and the planet, with fairness across generations and equal opportunity for all. Members are encouraged to set and publish concrete commitments under these principles. For example, to join the Council companies pledge "measurable steps" toward the UN Sustainable Development Goals, such as ending poverty, providing clean water, and reducing income inequality. Council members also commit to projects advancing environmental sustainability, gender equity, worker rights and other issues. The organization supports collaboration on these goals through working groups and events. Its leaders have convened forums (in partnership with bodies like the World Business Council for Sustainable Development and the World Benchmarking Alliance) on topics such as climate finance and just energy transition. (At COP28 in 2023, for instance, the Council co‑hosted panels on carbon pricing and transition strategies with other major organizations.) All member commitments are posted publicly, forming "the largest public repository of real-world company strategies" for inclusive capitalism. Commitments involve the four areas: people, prosperity, planet, and principles of governance.

The Council is a member organization of the World Economic Forum and closely affiliated with the Coalition for Inclusive Capitalism (founded in 2008 by Lynn Forrester de Rothschild).

== Work with the Catholic Church ==
From its inception, the Council has operated in partnership with the Vatican. Its founding announcement explicitly states it acts under the "moral guidance" of Pope Francis and Cardinal Turkson. December 2020 Francis met with several members and blessed the launch. The Pope has repeatedly endorsed the Council's mission in sermons and audiences, warning that an economic system "detached from ethical concerns" leads to a "'throwaway' culture," and calling "an inclusive capitalism that leaves no one behind, that discards none of our brothers or sisters, is a noble aspiration, worthy of your best effort". Council leaders often invoke Catholic social teaching in their work. Lynn Forester de Rothschild, the Council's founder, has said the group will heed Francis' call to listen to "the cry of the earth and the cry of the poor" as part of its mission. In practice, the Vatican connection means the Council's Guardians (its steering committee of CEOs) meet annually with Francis and Turkson to review progress.

== Members ==
The Council's membership spans major corporations, financial firms, foundations and institutional investors. Major corporate members cited at launch include Visa, Mastercard, Bank of America, Salesforce, Merck & Co, EY, DuPont, Johnson & Johnson, BP, Allianz and others. Institutional members include philanthropic and public entities such as the Ford Foundation, Rockefeller Foundation, CalPERS (California pension fund), and the International Trade Union Confederation.

=== Leadership ===
The Councils Guardians (Steering Committee) in early 2025 were:

- Mukesh Ambani, Chairman of Reliance Industries
- Murray Auchincloss, CEO of BP
- Edward Breen, CEO of DuPont
- Sharan Burrow, former general secretary of the International Trade Union Confederation
- Natarajan Chandrasekaran, CEO of Tata Sons
- Ronald Cohen, Chair of the International Foundation for Valuing Impacts
- Mathias Cormann, Secretary-General of the OECD
- Brunello Cucinelli, chairman of Brunello Cucinelli
- Lynn Forester de Rothschild, chair of E.L. Rothschild
- Marcie Frost, CEO of CalPERS
- Jaakko Kiander, CEO of Keva
- William Lauder, Chairman of The Estée Lauder Companies
- Boon Heng Lim, Chairman of Temasek
- Fiona Ma, California state treasurer
- Hiro Mizuno, Special Envoy of U.N. Secretary General on Innovative Finance and Sustainable Investments
- Brian Moynihan, CEO of Bank of America
- Ronald O’Hanley, CEO of State Street Corporation
- Peter R. Orszag, CEO of Lazard
- Gustavo Pimenta, CEO of Vale
- Punit Renjen, CEO of Deloitte
- Rajiv Shah, President of the Rockefeller Foundation
- Jeffrey W. Ubben, Founder and Chairman of ValueAct Capital
- Darren Walker, President of the Ford Foundation
- Jaime Augusto Zobel de Ayala, Chairman of the Ayala Corporation

== See also ==
- Inclusive capitalism
- Environmental, social, and governance
