= Humanistic capitalism =

Philosophy merging secular humanism with liberal capitalism

Humanistic capitalism is a form of capitalism that combines market-based economic activity with a concern for human welfare, social responsibility and environmental sustainability. It retains an emphasis on market forces and private enterprise, while arguing that it is in the self-interest of businesses to consider the broader long-term social and environmental effects of their activities, framing short-term profit maximisation that disregards such consequences as ultimately counterproductive to capitalism itself.

An early formulation of humanistic capitalism was developed by the American engineer and futurist Willis Harman, who in the 1970s argued that corporations should assume responsibility for creating a healthy society and a habitable environment, regarding this as a core part of the long-term interests of various businesses themselves, rather than as their alternative. More recently, Muhammad Yunus has described humanistic capitalism as a socially conscious business world where investors are content to recoup their investments but do not expect additional dividends.

The idea of humanistic capitalism is linked with the idea that fundamental changes must take place in economics today, as humanistic capitalism requires that there be a blending of the non-profit and for-profit sectors. If investors can accept the decrease in financial returns for those on a social level, humanistic capitalism will become a successful force in driving economic and social change. Philanthropy is a fundamental concept to humanistic capitalism. While the idea of humanistic capitalism is still growing, over "72% percent of social entrepreneurs say that raising money is a problem," and fundraising is a major issue to social entrepreneurs, who rely on philanthropy for support and funding.

== Businesses today ==
There are many businesses today that already combine the needs of the environment with the needs of people and the environment. SustainAbility, a company established in 1987, defines their purpose as to "seek solutions to social and environmental challenges that deliver long term value," and has worked on projects to "identify opportunities to innovate products and services with a reduced environmental footprint."

JEP Foundation promotes the philosophies of humanistic capitalism to create a kinder, gentler economic approach. The principles of Just Enough Profit (JEP) are used by companies to define what they stand for, how they treat their customers and employees, and how they serve humanity.

== Other views ==
In Willis Harman's seminal paper "Humanistic Capitalism: Another Alternative" (Journal of Humanistic Psychology, Vol. 14, No. 1, Winter 1974) he writes:

...corporations [must] assume an active responsibility for creating a healthy society and a habitable planet—not as a gesture to improve corporate image or as a moralistically undertaken responsibility, but because it is the only reasonable long-run interpretation of "good business." In the end, good business policy must become one with good social policy.

Ira Rohter, a professor in the Political Science Department at the University of Hawaii, promoted humanistic capitalism as a way to restore power to the people of Hawaii and their environment. He advocated that all growth be sustainable, self-reliant, and not only focused on profit, but the needs of people. Another key concept of humanistic capitalism, he added, is a democratic economy way based on "cooperation [and] openness" in order to meet the needs of Hawaii's people and environment.

President William Tolbert of Liberia (1971-1980) advocated "Humanistic Capitalism" as an economic development model for his country. Tolbert described his form of "Humanistic Capitalism" as a combination of free enterprise, the traditional altruistic way of life in Africa and Christian morals and values (He dubbed the latter two components as "Humanism"). He declared in his annual address to parliament in January 1977: "Humanistic Capitalism has as its primary concern and central interest the individual person whose value, worth and dignity must be considered supreme, and should never be exploited in any manner, but rather ever respected and protected." He admonished the wealthy people (the Americo-Liberian elite) to invest part of their wealth or profits of their companies in projects to help the impoverished masses of Liberia by raising their standard of living. By creating a larger entrepreneurial middle class, the country would become less dependent on foreign investors and Liberia would achieve some sort of self-reliance (although Tolbert – a successful businessman himself – remained committed to free trade). President Tolbert remained committed to humanistic capitalism until his murder in April 1980 by soldiers conducting a successful coup d'état.

Former Democratic 2020 United States presidential candidate Andrew Yang advocated for "human centered capitalism" as a highlight of his campaign. Ideals of the policy approach included "Humans are more important than money" and "Markets exist to serve our common goals and values". Yang stated his desire for universal basic income and an expanded safety net within a free-market capitalist economy.

== See also ==
- Welfare capitalism
- Social market economy
- Progressive capitalism
- Community capitalism
- Neo-Capitalism
- Binary economics
- Inclusive capitalism
- Inclusive growth
- Creating shared value
- Corporate social responsibility
- Redwashing
