= Inclusive capitalism =

Theoretical concept and policy movement

Inclusive capitalism, or stakeholder capitalism, is a theoretical concept and policy movement that seeks to address the growing income inequality and wealth inequality within Western capitalism following the 2008 financial crisis.

== Contemporary understanding ==
Klaus Schwab, the WEF's founder, is considered the originator of theory of stakeholder capitalism. He first presented this theory in 1971 in a book named Moderne Unternehmensführung im Maschinenenbau (Modern Enterprise Management in Mechanical Engineering).

Robert Ashford argues that the concept of inclusive capitalism is rooted in the postulates of the binary economics.

C. K. Prahalad opens his 2005 book The Fortune at the Bottom of the Pyramid: Eradicating Poverty Through Profits by asking “Why can’t we create inclusive capitalism”. He uses the term “inclusive capitalism” to invite readers to focus on underserved consumers and markets in order to create opportunity for all.

== Implementation ==
In 2012, the Henry Jackson Society created an Inclusive Capitalism Initiative task force in order to start a transatlantic conversation about the growing income inequalities and their threat to the capitalist system.

In 2014, Conference on Inclusive Capitalism, co-hosted by the City of London and E. L. Rothschild holding company, was held in London where the concept of inclusive capitalism was discussed as a practical measure. At another conference in 2015 the "Pathway to Action" was brainstormed. In the same 2015 year, the Coalition for Inclusive Capitalism was registered in the United States as a not-for-profit organization. Lynn Forester de Rothschild became the founding CEO of the Coalition. At the 2016 Conference on Inclusive Capitalism in New York City, participants expressed commitment to promote inclusive economic growth. Members of the Coalition expressed a belief that all stakeholders, including business and society, should be engaged in the enactment of an inclusive capitalism agenda

In 2019, the Embankment Project for Inclusive Capitalism (EPIC) undertaken by the Coalition together with Ernst & Young reported its findings in a white paper. It was a pioneering effort to "develop a framework and identify meaningful metrics to report on long-term and inclusive value creation activities that heretofore have not been captured on traditional financial statements".

In 2020, the Council for Inclusive Capitalism, a partnership of the Coalition with the Vatican, was created.

== Criticism ==
John Kay claims that most of the 21st-century businesses are already inclusive.

Nafeez Ahmed describes the Inclusive Capitalism Initiative as a Trojan Horse assembled to pacify the coming global revolt against capitalism.

== See also ==
- Community capitalism
- Humanistic capitalism
- Neo-Capitalism
- Progressive capitalism
- Green capitalism
- Pink capitalism
- Purple capitalism
- Binary economics
- Inclusive growth
- Creating shared value
- Corporate social responsibility
- Redwashing
