= Community capitalism =

Form of capitalism

Community capitalism is an approach to capitalism that places a priority on the well-being and sustainability of the community as a whole. The community could be a metropolitan area, region, or an entire country.

== Overview ==
In 1997, The American Assembly published a report titled "Community Capitalism: Rediscovering the Markets of America's Urban Neighborhoods", which they distributed to business leaders, President Clinton, cabinet members, members of Congress and governors, and the general public.

In 2013, George R. Tyler published the book What Went Wrong: How the 1% Hijacked the American Middle Class ... and What Other Countries Got Right, which describes the community capitalism models (which Tyler calls family capitalism) used by countries that have helped their citizens to prosper, despite the forces of globalization. He contrasts the experience of the U.S. over the past 30 years to that of Australia and the major nations of northern Europe (Austria, Belgium, Denmark, France, Germany, the Netherlands and Sweden).

== In Kalamazoo, Michigan ==
Community capitalism is the long-term strategy for economic growth of Kalamazoo, Michigan. The system uses focused and organized philanthropy and business investment occurring simultaneously. It focuses community resources into five key areas: place, capital, infrastructure, talent and education.

After a long period of corporate downsizings and results of mergers and acquisitions (most notably by Upjohn/Pharmacia/Pfizer, General Motors, First of America/National City and the paper industry), the Kalamazoo region went about changing the face of its downtown. It set up one of the nation's only community-based venture funds; establishing the "Southwest Michigan First Life Science Fund"; refurbishing a 2,200,000-square-foot (200,000 m^{2}) abandoned automotive stamping plant; building a 58,000-square-foot (5,400 m^{2}) life science accelerator; embracing the concept of talent-driven organizations; and funding the Kalamazoo Promise scholarship program. The community has since seen resurgence in job creation and overall economic growth.

The term community capitalism was used by Fast Company magazine in naming Kalamazoo in its "Fast 50" list in 2007.

== See also ==
- Binary economics
- Corporate social responsibility
- Creating shared value
- Humanistic capitalism
- Inclusive capitalism
- Inclusive growth
- Neo-Capitalism
- Progressive capitalism
- Redwashing
