= Andrew Stein =

American politician

Andy Stein
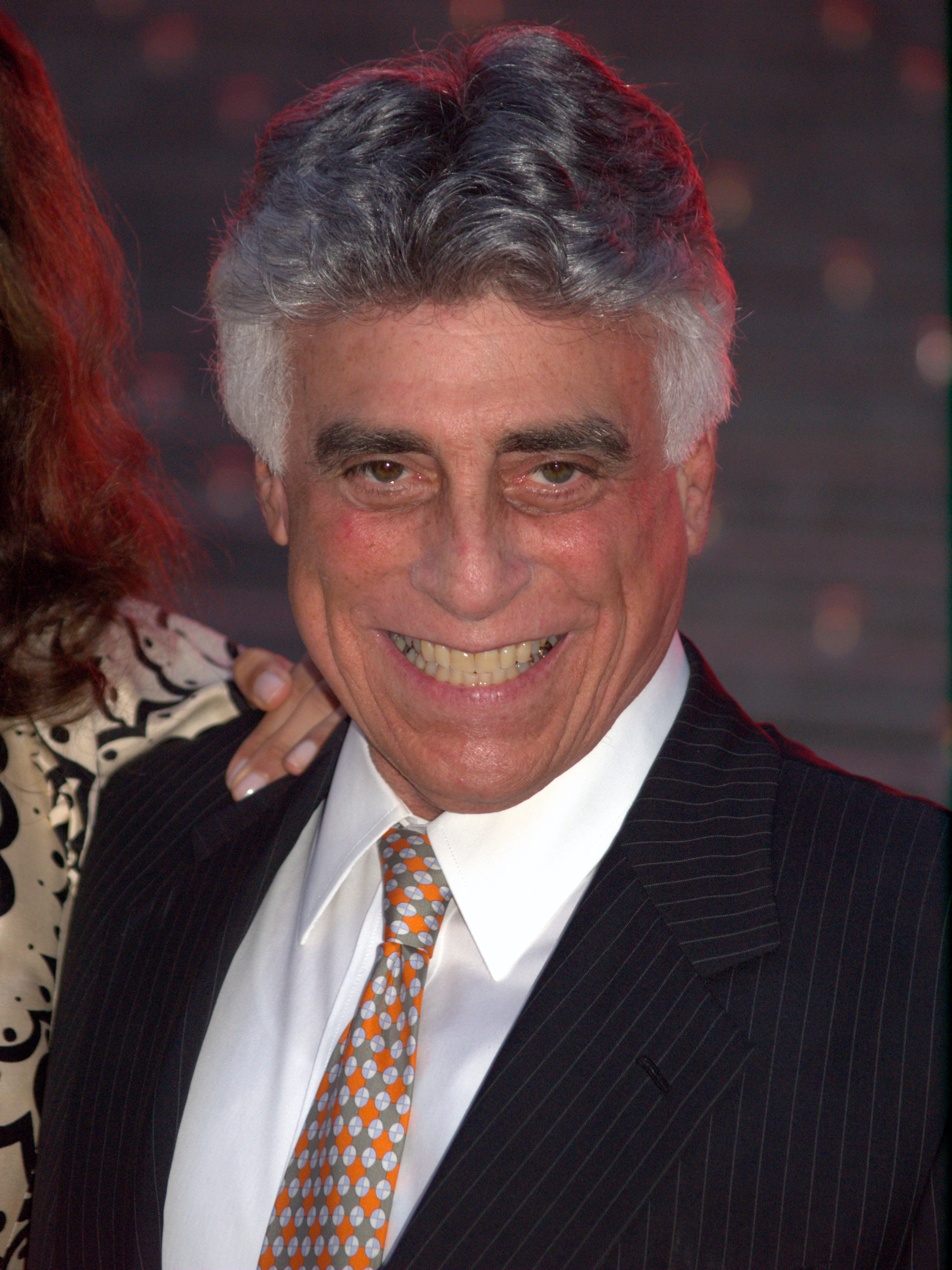
- Stein at the 2009 Tribeca Film Festival

President of the New York City Council
- In office January 1, 1986 – January 1, 1994
- Preceded by: Carol Bellamy
- Succeeded by: Mark Green (as New York City Public Advocate)

22nd Borough President of Manhattan
- In office January 1, 1978 – December 31, 1985
- Preceded by: Percy Sutton
- Succeeded by: David Dinkins

Member of the New York State Assembly
- In office January 1, 1969 – December 31, 1977
- Preceded by: William F. Larkin
- Succeeded by: Steven Sanders
- Constituency: 62nd district (1969–72); 65th district (1973–77)

Personal details
- Born: Andrew J. Finkelstein; January 10, 1945 (age 81)
- Party: Democratic
- Spouse: Lynn Forester (1983–1993)
- Children: 3
- Relatives: Jerry Finkelstein (father)
- Education: Stony Brook University, Southampton

Andrew Stein (born 10 January 1945 as Andrew J. Finkelstein) is an American Democratic politician who served on the New York City Council and was its last president. He also served as Manhattan Borough President.

== Early life ==
Stein's father, Jerry Finkelstein, was the multi-millionaire publisher of the New York Law Journal, among other publications. Stein shortened his name when he entered politics. Stein attended Southampton College. He is Jewish.

== Career ==
He was a member of the New York State Assembly from 1969 to 1977, sitting in the 178th, 179th, 180th, 181st and 182nd New York State Legislatures. He was well known for his series of public hearings into the management practices of nursing homes in the state.

In 1977, Stein was elected as borough president of Manhattan, defeating Robert F. Wagner Jr. and New York City Clerk David Dinkins in the Democratic primary. Stein defeated Dinkins again in the 1981 Democratic primary for the borough presidency. He was the Democratic nominee for Congress in the "Silk Stocking District" on Manhattan's East Side in 1984, but was defeated by incumbent Republican Bill Green. Stein declined a race for a third term as borough president in 1985 to run for city council president.

As city council president, Stein served as the presiding officer of the city council, was acting mayor in the absence or disability of Mayor Ed Koch, was a voting member of the New York City Board of Estimate, and handled constituent and policy issues. Stein derived most of his power from his seat on the Board of Estimate, which was made up of the mayor, the city comptroller and the city council president, each of whom had two votes, and the five borough presidents, each with one vote. Stein was re-elected City Council President in 1989.

In 1989, a decision by the United States Supreme Court declared the Board of Estimate was unconstitutional, in that it violated the principle of "one man, one vote", and a rewriting of the city charter called for the city council presidency to be abolished and the office of Public Advocate to be created as the presiding officer of the council and first in line of succession to the mayor. The change in duties would occur when Stein's term expired on January 1, 1994.

In 1993, Stein announced he would challenge Mayor Dinkins in the primary. Despite his reputation as a liberal, Stein had tried to get the endorsement of the Republican and Conservative parties, but was unsuccessful. Stein later dropped out before the primary and briefly tried a bid for public advocate against City Consumer Affairs Commissioner Mark Green, City Councilwoman Susan Alter, and State Sen. David Paterson, but withdrew from the race after a few weeks.

Stein retired from the city council presidency and from public life in the city. Since leaving office, he has pursued private business as a partner in Arapaho Partners, LLC, a business consulting firm based in New York City.

On May 27, 2010, Stein was indicted and arrested for lying about his involvement during the investigation of the multimillion-dollar Ponzi scheme involving Ken Starr, a financial advisor to various Hollywood celebrities. He pleaded guilty to a misdemeanor tax evasion charge and was sentenced to 500 hours of community service.

In 2025, Stein briefed President Donald Trump about how to best stop Democratic mayoral candidate Zohran Mamdani from winning the election.

== Personal life ==
Stein has been married twice. He and his first wife have one daughter. Stein's second marriage to attorney, Lynn Forester, lasted from 1983 to 1993 with the couple having two sons.

In 2026, Stein claimed a short-term romantic relationship and long-term friendship with feminist activist Gloria Steinem after her death, which began at the 1968 Democratic Convention.

== Bibliography ==
- Paterson, David Black, Blind, & In Charge: A Story of Visionary Leadership and Overcoming Adversity. New York, New York, 2020

New York State Assembly
Preceded by William F. Larkin	Member of the New York State Assembly from the 62nd district 1969–1972	Succeeded by Louis DeSalvio
Preceded by Richard Gottfried	Member of the New York State Assembly from the 65th district 1973–1977	Succeeded by Steven Sanders
Political offices
Preceded by Percy Sutton	Borough President of Manhattan; 1978–1985	Succeeded by David Dinkins
Preceded by Carol Bellamy	President of the New York City Council; 1986–1993	Succeeded by Mark Green as Public Advocate
