= Jerry Finkelstein =

American businessman (1916–2012)

- Born: January 26, 1916
- Died: November 28, 2012 (aged 96); New York City, US
- Education: New York University (BA); New York Law School (JD)
- Occupation: Publisher
- Known for: New York Law Journal; The Hill
- Spouse: Shirley Marks
- Children: Andrew Stein; James Finkelstein

Jerry Finkelstein (January 26, 1916 – November 28, 2012) was an American publisher, businessman and political insider. Among his publications were the New York Law Journal and The Hill. He was the father of former New York City Council president Andrew Stein.

== Early life and education ==
Finkelstein was born to a Jewish family, the son of Albert Finkelstein, a small business owner in Manhattan. He attended George Washington High School and New York University. He graduated in 1938 from the New York Law School.

== Career and political influence ==
After graduating from law school in 1938, instead of taking the bar exam, Finkelstein worked as a reporter at the New York Daily Mirror. In 1939, along with Arthur Brisbane's son, Seward Brisbane; he founded a newspaper called The Civil Service Leader, with public employees as the target audience. He ran unsuccessfully for the New York State Senate in 1942, the only time he ran for office. In 1949, Finkelstein successfully managed William O'Dwyer's mayoral re-election campaign; the following year, O'Dwyer appointed him director of the New York City Department of City Planning. In that role he frequently clashed with Robert Moses, who was successful in forcing him out after O'Dwyer resigned. In 1955 he opened a public relations firm; two years later, he merged with another public relations firm owned by Tex McCrary and Jinx Falkenburg. The resultant firm became a major force in financial public relations; after becoming the subject of a Securities and Exchange Commission investigation for insider trading, it was dissolved.

Finkelstein became chairman of Struthers Wells in 1961. He purchased the New York Law Journal in 1963 for $1 million. John F. Kennedy appointed him Chairman of the Fine Arts Gift Committee of the National Cultural Center (later, the Kennedy Center for the Performing Arts). In 1972, he was named commissioner of the Port Authority of New York and New Jersey by New York governor Nelson Rockefeller.

Finkelstein helped fundraising efforts by John F. Kennedy and Robert F. Kennedy, and also helped President Lyndon B. Johnson. His backing was instrumental in the election of his son, Andrew, to the New York State Assembly in 1968 (at the age of 23). Though a lifelong Democrat, he was also a key supporter of Republican Nelson Rockefeller's gubernatorial and presidential campaigns.

Late in his career, Finkelstein became a weekly newspaper mogul, amassing a stable of 23 newspapers in the New York metropolitan area and Washington D.C. These were part of the public company, News Communications, Inc. and Finkelstein was the long-time chairman of the board (1988–2009). The newspaper titles included The West Side Spirit and Our Town in New York City, Dan's Papers in the Hamptons and The Hill, in Washington, D.C., Finkelstein's crown jewel that was his creation. Many successful journalists and media executives worked for Finkelstein at News Communications, including Jim Rutenberg, Pulitzer Prize winning Times reporter; Tom Allon, who built two successful private media companies after serving as Finkelstein's right-hand man at News Communications; Michael Rothfeld, who won a Pulitzer at the Wall Street Journal and many others.

News Communications was sold off in pieces by Finkelstein's son, Jimmy, who took over as CEO in 2001, after a brief stint under corporate vulture Wilbur Ross. Jimmy eventually sold The Hill in 2022 for $130 million to Nexstar Media Group.

== Personal life and death ==
In 1942 Finkelstein married Shirley Marks, to whom he remained married until her death in 2003. He had two sons, Andrew Stein and James Finkelstein (married and divorced from Cathy Frank, daughter of Sidney Frank and granddaughter of Lewis Rosenstiel). Finkelstein died on November 28, 2012, at his home in Manhattan. He was 96.
