= Inclusive growth =

Economic growth that improves living standards

Inclusive growth is economic growth that raises standards of living for broad swaths of a population. It is widely accepted that inclusive growth is challenging to be achieved in the real world. Both the intangibility and long-term perspective make it less desirable than other more conspicuous economic targets for policymakers.

There is a lack of a comprehensive and worldly recognised set of standards to systematically measure the inclusiveness of growth, which makes data collection and policy evaluation difficult. Proponents for inclusive growth warn that inequitable growth may have adverse political outcomes.

The definition of inclusive growth implies direct links between the macroeconomic and microeconomic determinants of the economy and economic growth. The microeconomic dimension captures the importance of structural transformation for economic diversification and competition, while the macro dimension refers to changes in economic aggregates such as the country's gross national product (GNP) or gross domestic product (GDP), total factor productivity, and aggregate factor inputs.

Sustainable economic growth requires inclusive growth. Maintaining this is sometimes difficult because economic growth may give rise to negative externalities, such as a rise in corruption, which is a major problem in developing countries. Nonetheless, an emphasis on inclusiveness—especially on equality of opportunity in terms of access to markets, resources, and an unbiased regulatory environment—is an essential ingredient of successful growth. The inclusive growth approach takes a longer-term perspective, as the focus is on productive employment as a means of increasing the incomes of poor and excluded groups and raising their standards of living.

== Barriers ==
Many negative externalities of growth are fundamentally at odds with the target of inclusiveness, which further makes the situation complex. In many real life cases, inclusiveness carries much less weight than economic growth itself, and is sometimes sacrificed thoroughly.

== See also ==
- Smart growth
- Gross National Happiness
- Sufficiency economy
