= Economic ideology =

Set of views forming an ideology on the economy

An economic ideology is a set of views forming the basis of an ideology on how the economy should run. It differentiates itself from economic theory in being normative rather than just explanatory in its approach, whereas the aim of economic theories is to create accurate explanatory models to describe how an economy currently functions. However, the two are closely interrelated, as underlying economic ideology influences the methodology and theory employed in analysis. The diverse ideology and methodology of the 74 Nobel laureates in economics speaks to such interrelation.

A good way of discerning whether an ideology can be classified an economic ideology is to ask if it inherently takes a specific and detailed economic standpoint. Furthermore, economic ideology is distinct from an economic system that it supports, such as capitalism, to the extent that explaining an economic system (positive economics) is distinct from advocating it (normative economics). The theory of economic ideology explains its occurrence, evolution, and relation to an economy.

== Examples ==
=== Islamic economics ===
Islamic economics refers to the knowledge of economics or economic activities and processes in terms of Islamic principles and teachings. The religion of Islam has a set of special moral norms and values about individual and social economic behavior. Therefore, it has its own economic system, which is based on its philosophical views and is compatible with the Islamic organization of other aspects of human behavior: social and political systems. It is a term used to refer to Islamic commercial jurisprudence (fiqh al-mu'āmalāt), and also to an ideology of economics based on the teachings of Islam that is mostly similar to the labour theory of value, which is "labour-based exchange and exchange-based labour".

Islamic commercial jurisprudence entails the rules of transacting finance or other economic activity in a Shari'a compliant manner, i.e., a manner conforming to Islamic scripture (Quran and sunnah). Islamic jurisprudence (fiqh) has traditionally dealt with determining what is required, prohibited, encouraged, discouraged, or just permissible, according to the revealed word of God (Quran) and the religious practices established by Muhammad (sunnah). This applied to issues like property, money, employment, taxes, loans, along with everything else. The social science of economics, on the other hand, works to describe, analyse and understand production, distribution, and consumption of goods and services, and studied how to best achieve policy goals, such as full employment, price stability, economic equity and productivity growth.

Early forms of mercantilism and capitalism are thought to have been developed in the Islamic Golden Age from the 9th century and later became dominant in European Muslim territories like Al-Andalus and the Emirate of Sicily. The Islamic economic concepts taken and applied by the gunpowder empires and various Islamic kingdoms and sultanates led to systemic changes in their economy. Particularly in the Mughal India, its wealthiest region of Bengal, a major trading nation of the medieval world, signaled the period of proto-industrialization, making direct contribution to the world's first Industrial Revolution after the British conquests.

In the mid-twentieth century, campaigns began promoting the idea of specifically Islamic patterns of economic thought and behavior. By the 1970s, "Islamic economics" was introduced as an academic discipline in a number of institutions of higher learning throughout the Muslim world and in the West. The central features of an Islamic economy are often summarized as: (1) the "behavioral norms and moral foundations" derived from the Quran and Sunnah; (2) collection of zakat and other Islamic taxes, (3) prohibition of interest (riba) charged on loans.

Advocates of Islamic economics generally describe it as neither socialist nor capitalist, but as a "third way", an ideal mean with none of the drawbacks of the other two systems. Among the claims made for an Islamic economic system by Islamic activists and revivalists are that the gap between the rich and the poor will be reduced and prosperity enhanced by such means as the discouraging of the hoarding of wealth, taxing wealth (through zakat) but not trade, exposing lenders to risk through profit sharing and venture capital, discouraging of hoarding of food for speculation, and other activities that Islam regards as sinful such as unlawful confiscation of land. However, critics like Timur Kuran have described it as primarily a "vehicle for asserting the primacy of Islam", with economic reform being a secondary motive.

In the 2010s and as a complement to Islamic economics, the field of Islamic entrepreneurship or entrepreneurship from an Islamic perspective has gained traction. Islamic entrepreneurship studies the Muslim entrepreneur, entrepreneurial ventures, and contextual factors impacting entrepreneurship at the intersection of the Islamic faith and entrepreneurial activities.

=== Capitalism ===
Capitalism is a broad economic system where the means of production are largely or entirely privately owned and operated for profit, where the allocation of capital goods is determined by capital markets and financial markets. There are several implementations of capitalism that are loosely based around how much government involvement or public enterprise exists. The main ones that exist today are mixed economies, where the state intervenes in market activity and provides some services; laissez faire, where the state only supplies a court, a military, and police; and state capitalism, where the state engages in commercial business activity itself.

==== Laissez-faire ====
Laissez-faire, or free market capitalism, is an ideology that prescribes minimal public enterprise and government regulation in a capitalist economy. This ideology advocates for a type of capitalism based on open competition to determine the price, production and consumption of goods through the invisible hand of supply and demand reaching efficient market equilibrium. In such a system, capital, property and enterprise are entirely privately owned and new enterprises may freely gain market entry without restriction. Employment and wages are determined by a labour market that will result in some unemployment. Government and judicial intervention are employed at times to change the economic incentives for people for various reasons. The capitalist economy will likely follow economic growth along with a steady business cycle.

==== Social market ====
The social market economy, also known as Rhine capitalism, is advocated by the ideology of ordoliberalism and social liberalism. This ideology supports a free-market economy where supply and demand determine the price of goods and services, and where markets are free from regulation. However, this economic calls for state action in the form of social policy favoring social insurance, unemployment benefits and recognition of labor rights.

==== Social democracy ====
Social democracy is an ideology that prescribes high public enterprise and government regulation in a capitalist economy. It espouses state regulation (rather than state ownership of the means of production) and extensive social welfare programs. Social democracy became associated with Keynesianism, the Nordic model, the social liberal paradigm and welfare states within political circles in the late 20th century.

==== Neo-capitalism ====
Neo-capitalism is an economic ideology that blends elements of capitalism with other systems and emphasizes government intervention in the economy to save and reconstruct companies that are deemed a risk to the nation. The ideology's prime years are considered by some economists to be the ten years leading up to 1964 after the Great Depression and World War II. After World War II, countries were destroyed and needed to rebuild and since capitalism thrives in industrializing countries. These countries most affected by the war saw a growth in capitalism. Neo-capitalism differs from regular capitalism in that while capitalism highlights private owners, neo-capitalism emphasizes the role of the state in sustaining the country as a provider and a producer and condemns private companies for lacking in their role as a provider and producer for their country. Critics of neo-capitalism claim that it tends to suppress the reserve army of labor, which may lead to full employment, as this can undermine one of the main basics that make capitalism work. Other critics state that if neo-capitalism was put into place, it would become immediately corrupt.

=== Fascism ===
Fascism as an economic system promotes the pursuit of individual profit while promoting corporations through government subsidies as the primary tool of economic progress as long as their activities are in line with the goals of the state. In fascist economies, profits or gains are individualized while losses are socialized. These economies are often compared to the third way due to being heavily corporatized. Economies of the mid-20th century such as Fascist Italy and Nazi Germany often used bilateral trade agreements, with heavy tariffs on imports and government subsidized exports to developing nations around the world. While economically fascism is oriented towards self-sufficiency, politically fascist countries of the mid-20th century were oriented to war and expansion; two seemingly contradictory motives. The goals of fascist nations was to create a closed economic system which is self-reliant, but is also ready and prepared to engage in war and territorial expansion. Fascist economies can then be seen as state capitalist.

=== Socialism ===
Socialism is any of the various ideologies of economic organization based on some form of social ownership of the means of production and cooperative management of the allocation of resources. Socialist systems can be classified according to the dominant coordination mechanism employed (economic planning or markets) and by the type and degree of ownership (such as public ownership or cooperatives). In some models of socialism (often called market socialism), the state approves of the prices and products produced in the economy, subjecting the market system to direct external regulations. Alternatively, the state may produce the goods but then sell them in competitive markets.

==== Democratic socialism ====
Democratic socialism (sometimes referred to as economic democracy) is an economic ideology that calls for democratic institutions in the economy. These may take the form of cooperatives, workplace democracy or ad hoc approaches to the management and ownership of the means of production. Democratic socialism blends socialistic and democratic ideas to create a political and economic structure.

==== Marxism–Leninism ====
Marxism–Leninism as a political ideology promotes a planned economy. This ideology formed the economic basis of all existing socialist states. Socialist economic doctrines essentially promote the collectivist idea that an economy's resources should be used in the interest of all participants, and not simply for private gain. This ideology historically opposed the concept of a market economy, and tended to favor central planning.

=== Communism ===
As Karl Marx and Friedrich Engels described it (in Manifesto of the Communist Party), communism is the evolved result of socialism so that the central role of the state has 'withered away' and is no longer necessary for the functioning of a planned economy. All means of production are collectively owned and managed in a communal, classless society. Currency is no longer needed, and all economic activity, enterprise, labour, production and consumption is freely exchanged, "from each according to his ability, to each according to his needs". Communism is also a political system as much as an economic one—with various models in how it is implemented—the well known being the Marxist–Leninist model, which argues for the use of a vanguard party to bring about a workers state to be used as a transitional tool to bring about stateless communism, the economic arrangement described above. Other models to bring about communism include anarcho-communism, which argues similarly to Marxist schools for a revolutionary transformation to the above economic arrangement, but does not use a transitional period or vanguard party.

=== Anarcho-primitivism ===
Anarcho-primitivism strives to return humans to a pre-industrialized and pre-civilization state. From an economic standpoint, advocates of this model argue the non-necessity of economic systems for human existence. Proponents of this ideology believe that the entire history of human civilization took a wrong turn from hunter-gatherer systems into an agricultural system and has led to human dependence on technology to support increasing populations, government control, and culture. Population growth and the institutions created to support and control it are exploitative of not only humans but also the environment. They argue that the more people live in a society, the more resources they will need. These resources must be taken from the Earth and therefore lead to environmental exploitation. However, they claim that materialist exploitation can be seen throughout almost every society in the world today. This materialism creates inequalities and exploitation such as class structure, the exploitation of humans in the name of labor and profit, and most importantly environmental destruction and deterioration. This exploitation has led to the increase in human population growth, activity, and development which they argue is destroying the Earth's ecosystems. They emphasize coexisting with the natural world instead of destroying it, "a world order on our planet where human civilization is brought into harmony with nature".

Anarcho-primitivists differ from other anarchist and green ideologies by opposing technological and industrial advancement as it further propagates the exploitation of humans. "Technology is not a simple tool which can be used in any way we like. It is a form of social organization, a set of social relations. It has its own laws. If we are to engage in its use, we must accept its authority. The enormous size, complex interconnections and stratification of tasks which make up modern technological systems make authoritarian command necessary and independent, individual decision-making impossible." Anarcho-primitivists seek to revert the economic and government institutions of civilization which they argue are authoritarian, exploitative, and abstract and return humanity to a way of living which is harmonious with the natural world in which technology used mostly individually to create tools for survival much like in primitive cultures and tribes where they argue there is little need for abstract things such as an economy or government.

== See also ==
- Casino capitalism
- Constitutional economics
- Critique of political economy
- Economic system
- Development economics
- Ecological economics
- Political economy
- Political ideology
- Schools of economic thought
- Social model

== Bibliography ==
- Karl Brunner, 1996. Economic Analysis and Political Ideology: The Selected Essays of Karl Brunner, v. 1, Thomas Ly, ed. Chapter: preview links via scroll down.
- Gombert, Tobias (2009). Bläsius, Julia; Krell, Christian; Timpe, Martin (eds.). Foundations of Social Democracy. Social Democratic Reader. Vol. 1. Translated by Patterson, James. Berlin: Friedrich-Ebert-Stiftung. ISBN 978-3-86872-215-4.
- Klappholz, Kurt (1987). "ideology". The New Palgrave: A Dictionary of Economics. 2: 716–18.
- From The New Palgrave Dictionary of Economics. 2008, 2nd Edition:

"capitalism" by Robert L. Heilbroner. Abstract.
"contemporary capitalism" by William Lazonick. Abstract.
"Maoist economics" by Wei Li. Abstract.
"social democracy" by Ben Jackson. Abstract.
"welfare state" by Assar Lindbeck. Abstract.
"American exceptionalism" by Louise C. Keely.Abstract.
"laissez-faire, economists and" by Roger E. Backhouse and Steven G. Medema. Abstract.

- Khan, Feisal (2015). Islamic Banking in Pakistan: Shariah-Compliant Finance and the Quest to Make Pakistan More Islamic. Routledge. ISBN 9781317366539.
- Kuran, Timur (2004). Islam and Mammon: The Economic Predicaments of Islamism. Princeton, NJ: Princeton University Press. ISBN 978-1400837359.
- Julie A. Nelson and Steven M. Sheffrin, 1991. "Economic Literacy or Economic Ideology?" Journal of Economic Perspectives, 5(3), pp. 157–65 (press +).
- Roy, Olivier (1994). The Failure of Political Islam. Harvard University Press. ISBN 978-0-674-29141-6.
- Joseph A. Schumpeter, 1942. Capitalism, Socialism and Democracy.
- _____, 1949. "Science and Ideology," American Economic Review, 39(2), pp. 346–59. Reprinted in Daniel M. Hausman, 1994, 2nd rev. ed., The Philosophy of Economics: An Anthology, Cambridge University Press, pp. 224–38.
- Sejersted, Francis (2011). Adams, Madeleine B. (ed.). The Age of Social Democracy: Norway and Sweden in the Twentieth Century. Translated by Daly, Richard. Princeton University Press. ISBN 978-0-691-14774-1.
- Robert M. Solow, 1971. "Science and Economic Ideology," The Public Interest, 23(1) pp. 94–107. Reprinted in Daniel M. Hausman, 1994, 2nd rev. ed., The Philosophy of Economics: An Anthology, Cambridge University Press, pp. 239–51.
- Karl Marx, 1857–58. "Ideology and Method in Political Economy," in Grundrisse: Foundation of the Critique of Political Economy, tr. 1973. Reprinted in Daniel M. Hausman, 1994, 2nd rev. ed., The Philosophy of Economics: An Anthology, Cambridge University Press, pp. 119–42.
- Earl A. Thompson and Charles Robert Hickson, 2000. Ideology and the Evolution of Vital Economic Institutions. Springer.Descrip;tion and chapter preview links, pp. vii–x.
