= Employee compensation in the United States =

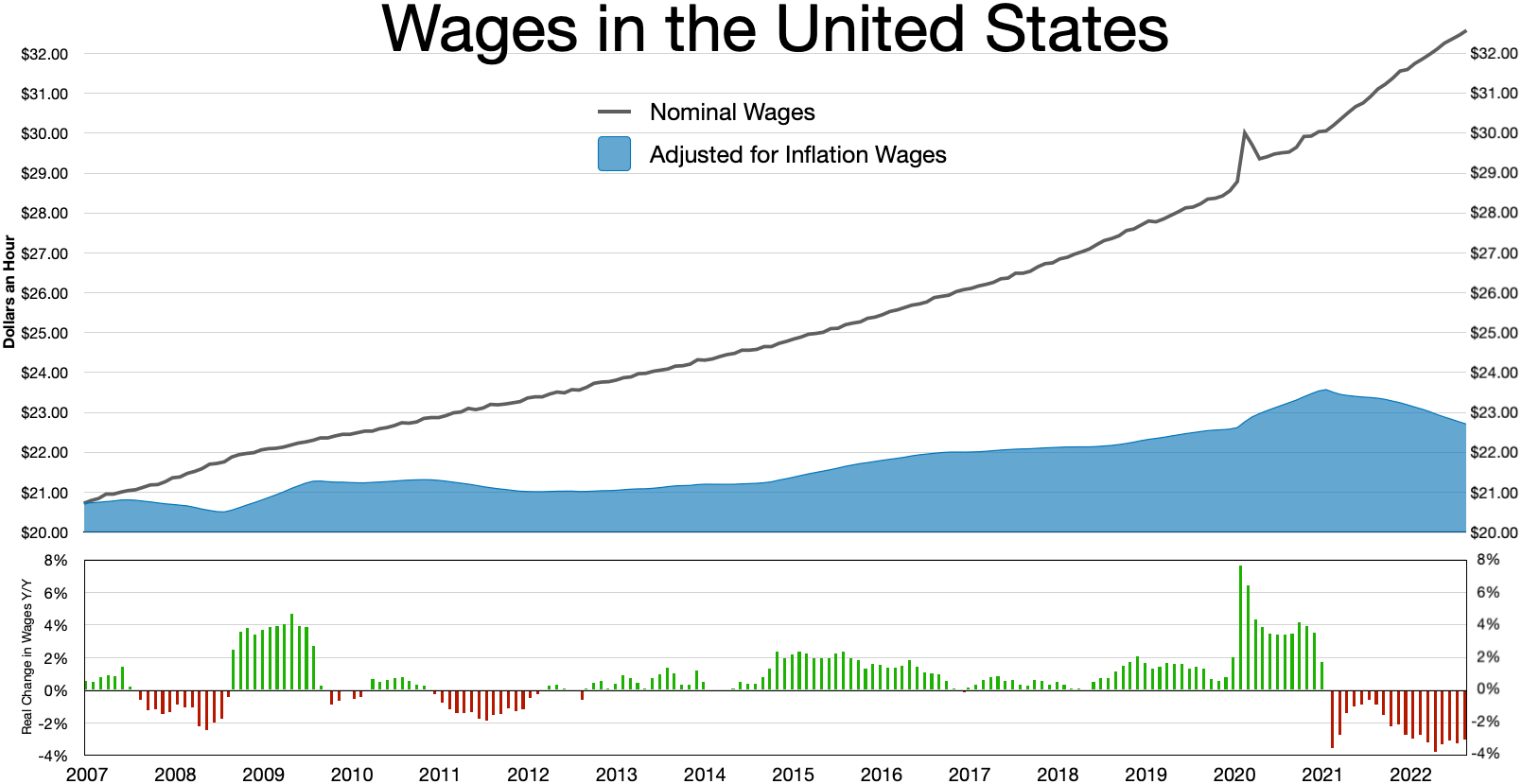
Wages in the United States Nominal wages Adjusted for inflation wages

Employer compensation in the United States refers to the cash compensation and benefits that an employee receives in exchange for the service they perform for their employer. Approximately 93% of the working population in the United States are employees earning a salary or wage.

Typically, cash compensation consists of a wage or salary, and may include commissions or bonuses. Benefits consist of retirement plans, health insurance, life insurance, disability insurance, vacation, employee stock ownership plans, etc.

Compensation can be fixed and/or variable, and is often both. Variable pay is based on the performance of the employee. Commissions, incentives, and bonuses are forms of variable pay.

Benefits can also be divided into company-paid and employee-paid. Some, such as holiday pay, vacation pay, etc., are usually paid for by the firm. Others are often paid, at least in part, by employees—a notable example is medical insurance.

Compensation in the US (as in all countries) is shaped by law, tax policy, and history. Health insurance is a common employee benefit because there is no government-sponsored national health insurance in the United States, and premiums are deductible on personal income tax. 401(k) accounts are a common employer organized program for retirement savings because of their tax benefits.

== Salaries, wages, commissions ==
Salary, bonuses, and non-equity incentives are often called "Total Cash Compensation".

=== Wages ===
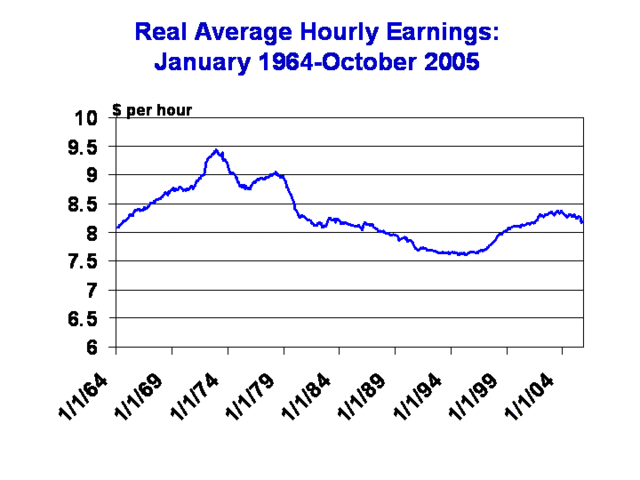
Wages adjusted for inflation in the US from 1964 to 2004

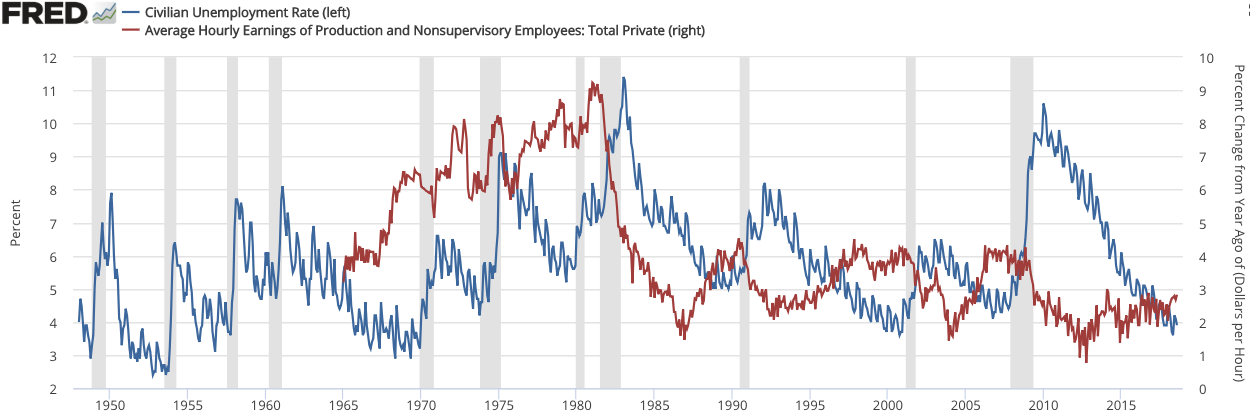
Unemployment compared to wages

Wage data (e.g. median wages) for different occupations in the US can be found from the US Department of Labor Bureau of Labor Statistics, broken down into subgroups (e.g. marketing managers, financial managers, etc.) by state, metropolitan areas, and gender.

In the United States, wages for most workers are set by market forces, or else by collective bargaining, where a labor union negotiates on the workers' behalf. The Fair Labor Standards Act (FLSA) establishes a minimum wage at the federal level that all states must abide by, among other provisions. Fourteen states and a number of cities have set their own minimum wage rates that are higher than the federal level. For certain federal or state government contracts, employers must pay the so-called prevailing wage as determined according to the Davis–Bacon Act or its state equivalent. Activists have undertaken to promote the idea of a living wage rate which accounts for living expenses and other basic necessities, setting the living wage rate much higher than current minimum wage laws require.

"The FLSA requires that most employees in the United States be paid at least the federal minimum wage for all hours worked and overtime pay at time and one-half the regular rate of pay for all hours worked over 40 hours in a workweek."

=== Salaries ===
In the United States, the distinction between periodic salaries (which are normally paid regardless of hours worked) and hourly wages (meeting a minimum wage test and providing for overtime) was first codified by the Fair Labor Standards Act of . Five categories were identified as being "exempt" from minimum wage and overtime protections, and therefore salariable—executive, administrative, professional, computer, and outside sales employees. Salary is generally set on a yearly basis. (These employees must be paid on a salary basis above a certain level, $455 per week as o, though some professions – "Outside Sales Employees", teachers and practitioners of law or medicine—are exempt from that requirement.)

== Executive compensation ==
"Executive compensation" has its own set of regulations and lacks many of the tax benefits of other employee compensation because it exceeds their income limits.

== Equity compensation ==
=== Employee stock options ===
Employee stock options are call options on the common stock of a company. Their value increases as the company's stock rises. Employee stock options are mostly offered to management with restrictions on the option (such as vesting and limited transferability), in an attempt to align the holder's interest with those of the business shareholders. Options may also be offered to non-executive level staff, especially by businesses that are not yet profitable, insofar as they may have few other means of compensation. They may also be remuneration for non-employees: suppliers, consultants, lawyers, and promoters for services rendered.

There is usually a period before the employee can "vest", i.e. sell or transfer the stock or options. Vesting may be granted all at once ("cliff vesting") or over a period time ("graded vesting"), in which case it may be "uniform" (e.g. 20% of the options vest each year for 5 years) or "non-uniform" (e.g. 20%, 30%, and 50% of the options vest each year for the next three years).

==== Types of employee stock options ====
In the U.S., stock options granted to employees are of two forms, that differ primarily in their tax treatment. They may be either:

- Incentive stock options (ISOs)
- Non-qualified stock options (NQSOs or NSOs)

=== Other equity-based compensation ===
Besides stock options, other forms of individual equity compensation include:

- restricted stock – Stock that cannot be sold by the owner until certain conditions are met (usually a certain length of time passing (vesting period) or a certain goal achieved, such as reaching financial targets) They may be compared to stock options with a strike price of $0.
- restricted stock units (RSUs) – Rights to own the employer’s stock, unlike restricted stock they are tracked as bookkeeping entries and lack voting rights. They may be paid in stock or cash. The National Center of Employee Ownership describes them as being "like phantom stock settled in shares instead of cash"
- stock appreciation rights – These provide the right to the monetary equivalent of the increase in the value of a specified number of shares over a specified period of time. As with phantom stock, it is normally paid out in cash, but may be paid in shares.
- phantom stock – A promise to pay a bonus in the form of the equivalent of either the value of company shares or the increase in that value over a period of time.
- employee stock purchase plan (ESPP)

==== Taxation of employee stock options in the United States ====
Because most employee stock options are non-transferable and are not immediately exercisable though they can be readily hedged to reduce risk, the IRS considers that their "fair market value" cannot be "readily determined", and therefore "no taxable event" occurs when an employee receives an option grant. Depending on the type of option granted, the employee may or may not be taxed upon exercise. Non-qualified stock options (those most often granted to employees) are taxed upon exercise. Incentive stock options (ISO) are not, assuming that the employee complies with certain additional tax code requirements. Most importantly, shares acquired upon exercise of ISOs must be held for at least one year after the date of exercise if the favorable capital gains tax are to be achieved.

However, taxes can be delayed or reduced by avoiding premature exercises and holding them until near expiration day and hedging along the way. The taxes applied when hedging are friendly to the employee/optionee.

==== Generally accepted accounting principles ====
According to US generally accepted accounting principles in effect before June 2005, stock options granted to employees did not need to be recognized as an expense on the income statement when granted, although the cost was disclosed in the notes to the financial statements. This allows a potentially large form of employee compensation to not show up as an expense in the current year, and therefore, currently overstate income. Many assert that over-reporting of income by methods such as this by American corporations was one contributing factor in the Stock Market Downturn of 2002.

===== Excess tax benefits from stock-based compensation =====
This item of the profit-and-loss (P&L) statement of companies' earnings reports is due to the different timing of option expense recognition between the GAAP P&L and how the IRS deals with it, and the resulting difference between estimated and actual tax deductions.

At the time the options are awarded, GAAP requires an estimate of their value to be run through the P&L as an expense. This lowers operating income and GAAP taxes. However, the IRS treats option expense differently, and only allows their tax deductibility at the time the options are exercised/expire and the true cost is known.

This means that cash taxes in the period the options are expensed are higher than GAAP taxes. The delta goes into a deferred income tax asset on the balance sheet. When the options are exercised/expire, their actual cost becomes known and the precise tax deduction allowed by the IRS can then be determined. There is then a balancing up event. If the original estimate of the options' cost was too low, there will be more tax deduction allowed than was at first estimated. This 'excess' is run through the P&L in the period when it becomes known (i.e. the quarter in which the options are exercised). It raises net income (by lowering taxes) and is subsequently deducted out in the calculation of operating cash flow because it relates to expenses/earnings from a prior period.

== Benefits ==
The term "fringe benefits" was coined by the War Labor Board during World War II to describe the various indirect benefits which industry had devised to attract and retain labor when direct wage increases were prohibited.

Employee benefits in the United States might include relocation assistance; medical, prescription, vision and dental plans; health and dependent care flexible spending accounts; retirement benefit plans (pension, 401(k), 403(b)); group-term life and long term care insurance plans; legal assistance plans; adoption assistance; child care benefits; transportation benefits; and possibly other miscellaneous employee discounts (e.g., movies and theme park tickets, wellness programs, discounted shopping, hotels and resorts, and so on). Companies provide benefits that go beyond a base salary figure for a number of reasons: To raise productivity and lower turnover by raising employee satisfaction and corporate loyalty, take advantage of deductions, credits in the tax code. Wellness programs can also lower health insurance costs.

Many employer-provided cash benefits (below a certain income level) are tax-deductible to the employer and non-taxable to the employee. Some fringe benefits (for example, accident and health plans, and group-term life insurance coverage (up to US$50,000) (and employer-provided meals and lodging in-kind,) may be excluded from the employee's gross income and, therefore, are not subject to federal income tax in the United States. Some function as tax shelters (for example, flexible spending accounts, 401(k)'s, 403(b)'s). Fringe benefits are also thought of as the costs of keeping employees other than salary. These benefit rates are typically calculated using fixed percentages that vary depending on the employee’s classification and often change from year to year.

Executive benefits (e.g. golden handshake and golden parachute plans), exceed this level and are taxable.

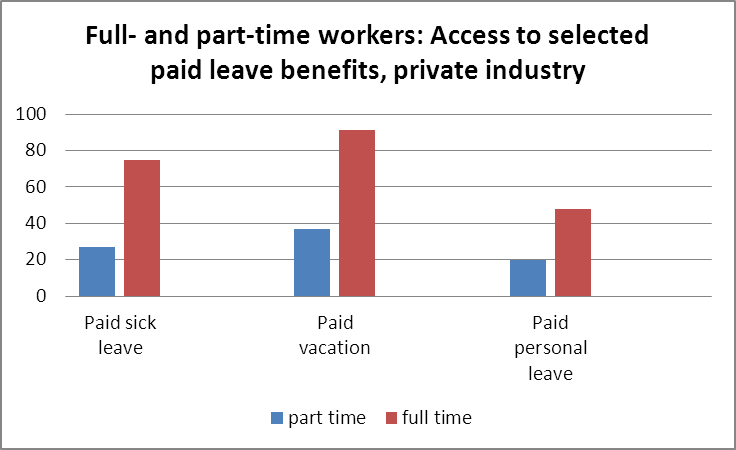
from US Department of Labor, Bureau of Labor Statistics, National Compensation Survey (NCS), March 2011

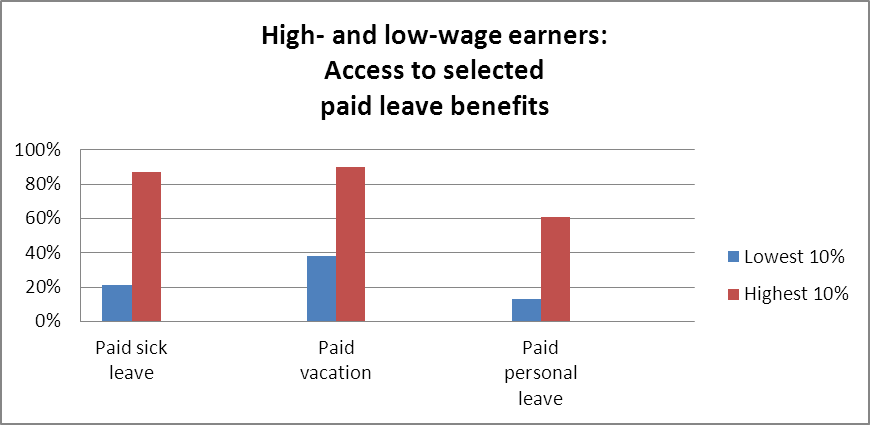
Benefits for workers earning wages in the highest and lowest 10th percent of private industry employees. From US Department of Labor, Bureau of Labor Statistics, National Compensation Survey (NCS), March 2011

Full-time and high wage workers are much more likely to have benefits, as the charts to the right indicates.

Benefits can be divided into as company-paid and employee-paid. Some, such as holiday pay, vacation pay, etc., are usually paid for by the firm. Others are often paid, at least in part, by employees. A notable example is medical insurance, which has risen in cost dramatically in recent decades and been shifted to employees by many American employers. Even when paid entirely by employees, these programs may still provide value to employees and be called benefits because their cost may be considerably lower than that of equivalent non-employer-sponsored programs, thanks to employers having negotiated discounts with providers.

Some benefits, such as unemployment and worker's compensation, are federally required and arguably can be considered a right, rather than a benefit.

American corporations often offer cafeteria plans to their employees. These plans would offer a menu and level of benefits for employees to choose from. In most instances, these plans are funded by both the employees and by the employer(s). The portion paid by the employees is deducted from their gross pay before federal and state taxes are applied. Some benefits would still be subject to the Federal Insurance Contributions Act tax (FICA), such as 401(k) and 403(b) contributions; however, health premiums, some life premiums, and contributions to flexible spending accounts are exempt from FICA.

=== Perks ===
The term perks is often used colloquially to refer to those benefits of a more discretionary nature. Often, perks are given to employees who are doing notably well and/or have seniority. Common perks are take-home vehicles, hotel stays, free refreshments, leisure activities on work time (golf, etc.), stationery, allowances for lunch, and—when multiple choices exist—first choice of such things as job assignments and vacation scheduling. They may also be given first chance at job promotions when vacancies exist.

== Pensions ==
Traditional pensions, known as Defined benefit pension plans, provides employees with a guaranteed paycheck (or lump sum) in retirement. The benefit is usually "defined" by a formula based on the employee's earnings history, tenure of service and age, and not depending on investment returns. Because of the high cost and responsibility of the employer to finance the plan, in recent years many companies have phased out their pension plans sometimes replacing them with defined contribution deferred compensation plans, which are defined by contribution.

== Deferred compensation ==
=== Qualifying and non-qualifying ===
Deferred compensation is any arrangement where an employee receives wages after they have earned them. Deferred compensation plans in the US often have the benefit of employers' matching all or part of the employee contribution.

In the US, Internal Revenue Code section 409A regulates the treatment for federal income tax purposes of “nonqualified deferred compensation”, the timing of deferral elections and of distributions.

=== Qualifying ===
A "qualifying" deferred compensation plan is one complying with the ERISA, the Employee Retirement Income Security Act of 1974. Qualifying plans include 401(k) (for non-government organizations), 403(b) (for public education employers), 501(c)(3) (for non-profit organizations and ministers), and 457(b) (for state and local government organizations) Most medium-sized and large companies offer 401(k)’s.

ERISA, has many regulations, one of which is how much employee income can qualify. In an ERISA-qualified plan (like a 401(k) plan), the company's contribution to the plan is tax deductible to the plan as soon as it is made, but not taxable to the individual participants until it is withdrawn. So if a company puts $1,000,000 into a 401(k) plan for employees, it writes off $1,000,000 that year. If the company is in the 25% bracket, the contribution costs it only $750,000 (with $250,000 saved in taxes).

Employee benefits provided through ERISA are not subject to state-level insurance regulation like most insurance contracts, but employee benefit products provided through insurance contracts are regulated at the state level. However, ERISA does not generally apply to plans by governmental entities, churches for their employees, and some other situations.

The tax benefits in qualifying plans were intended to encourage lower-to-middle income earners to save more, high income-earners already having high savings rates. As of 2008, the maximum qualifying annual income was $230,000. So, for example, if a company declared a 25% profit sharing contribution, any employee making less than $230,000 could deposit the entire amount of their profit sharing check (up to $57,500, 25% of $230,000) in their ERISA-qualifying account. For the company CEO making $1,000,000/year, $57,500 would be less than 1/4 of his $250,000 profit sharing cut. It is for high earners like the CEO, that companies provide "DC" (i.e. deferred compensation plans).

=== Non-qualifying ===
A nonqualified deferred compensation (NQDC) plan is a written agreement between an employer and an employee wherein the employee voluntarily agrees to have part of their compensation withheld by the company, invested on their behalf, and given to them at some pre-specified point in the future. NQDC refers to a specific part of the tax code that provides a special benefit to corporate executives and other highly compensated corporate employees. Non-Qualified Deferred Compensation is also sometimes referred to as deferred comp (which technically would include qualifying deferred comp but the more common use of the phrase does not), DC, non-qualified deferred comp, NQDC or golden handcuffs.

"Most large companies" have a NQDC that takes compensation until some future date. Income tax is deferred until the recipient receives payment. Depending on the firm and employee, DC can be optional or mandatory, contributions may come only from salary, or may allow gains from stock options. At some firms it is mandatory for all salary in excess of $1 million/year. The benefit feature of NQDC plans vary. Some plans provide matching contributions, which can be awarded at the board's discretion or by a formula. The contributions in the plan may earn a guaranteed minimum rate of "investment," or at a premium over the market rate.

Nonqualifying differs from qualifying in that:

1. Employers may also pick and choose which employees they provide deferred compensation benefits to rather than being required to offer the same plan to all employees.
2. NQDC has the flexibility to treat different employees differently. The benefit promised need not follow any of the rules associated with qualified plans (e.g. the 25% or $44,000 limit on contributions to defined contribution plans). The vesting schedule can be whatever the employer would like it to be.
3. Companies may provide deferred compensation benefits to independent contractors, not just employees.
4. The employer contributions are not tax deductible
5. Employees must pay taxes on deferred compensation at the time such compensation is eligible to be received (not just when it is actually drawn out).

Deferred comp is only available to senior management and other highly compensated employees of companies. Although DC is not restricted to public companies, there must be a serious risk that a key employee could leave for a competitor and deferred comp is a "sweetener" to try to entice them to stay. If a company is closely held (i.e. owned by a family, or a small group of related people), the IRS will look much more closely at the potential risk to the company.

1. Assets in plans that fall under ERISA (for example, a 401(k) plan) must be put in a trust for the sole benefit of its employees. If a company goes bankrupt, creditors are not allowed to get assets inside the company's ERISA plan. Deferred comp, because it does not fall under ERISA, is a general asset of the corporation. While the corporation may choose to not invade those assets as a courtesy, legally they are allowed to, and may be forced to, give deferred compensation assets to creditors in the case of a bankruptcy. A special kind of trust called a rabbi trust (because it was first used in the compensation plan for a rabbi) may be used. A rabbi trust puts a "fence" around the money inside the corporation and protects it from being raided for most uses other than the corporation's bankruptcy/insolvency. However, plan participants may not receive a guarantee that they will be paid prior to creditors being paid in case of insolvency.
2. Federal income tax rates change frequently. Deferred compensation has tax benefits if the income tax rates are lower when the compensation is withdrawn then when it was "deposited" (i.e. at the time it was deferred), and tax disadvantages if the reverse is true.

=== Deferred comp agreements ===
Plans are usually put in place either at the request of executives or as an incentive by the Board of Directors. They're drafted by lawyers, recorded in the Board minutes with parameters defined. There is a doctrine called constructive receipt, which means an executive cannot have control of the investment choices or the option to receive the money whenever he wants. If he is allowed to do either of those 2 things or both, he often has to pay taxes on it right away.

=== Taxation ===
In a deferred comp plan, unlike an ERISA (such as a 401(k) plan), the company does not get to deduct the taxes in the year the contribution is made, they deduct them the year the contribution becomes non-forfeitable. For example, if ABC company allows SVP John Smith to defer $200,000 of his compensation in 1990, which he will have the right to withdraw for the first time in the year 2000, ABC puts the money away for John in 1990, John pays taxes on it in 2000. If John keeps working there after 2000, it does not matter because he was allowed to receive it (or "constructively received") the money in 2000.

Other circumstances around deferred comp. Most of the provisions around deferred comp are related to circumstances the employee's control (such as voluntary termination), however, deferred compensation often has a clause that says in the case of the employee's death or permanent disability, the plan will immediately vest and the employee (or estate) can get the money.

== Performance-linked incentives ==
Long-term incentives are paid five or at least three years out. They are often a mixture of cash and shares of stock in the company, or some other type of equity compensation such as stock options, which are almost always subject to restrictions based on time, performance, or both, known as vesting.

== Clawback of "faithless servant" employee compensation ==
Under the faithless servant doctrine, which is a doctrine under the laws of a number of states in the United States, and most notably New York State law, an employee who acts unfaithfully towards his or her employer must forfeit all compensation received during the period of disloyalty, which compensation is subject to clawback by the employer.
