= Stock option expensing =

Method of accounting for the value of share options

Stock option expensing is a method of accounting for the value of share options, distributed as incentives to employees within the profit and loss reporting of a listed business. On the income statement, balance sheet, and cash flow statement the loss from the exercise is accounted for by noting the difference between the market price (if one exists) of the shares and the cash received, the exercise price, for issuing those shares through the option.

Opponents of considering options an expense say that the real loss – due to the difference between the exercise price and the market price of the shares – is already stated on the cash flow statement. They would also point out that a separate loss in earnings per share (due to the existence of more shares outstanding) is also recorded on the balance sheet by noting the dilution of shares outstanding. Simply, accounting for this on the income statement is believed to be redundant to them. (Note: Currently, the future appreciation of all shares issued are not accounted for on the income statement but can be noted upon examination of the balance sheet and cash flow statement.)

== Methods ==
The two methods to calculate the expense associated with stock options are the "intrinsic value" method and the "fair-value" method. Only the fair-value method is permissible under U.S. GAAP and IFRS. The intrinsic value method, associated with Accounting Principles Board Opinion 25, calculates the intrinsic value as the difference between the market value of the stock and the exercise price of the option at the date the option is issued (the "grant date"). Since companies generally issue stock options with exercise prices which are equal to the market price, the expense under this method is generally zero.

The fair-value method uses either the price on a market or calculates the value using a mathematical formula such as the Black–Scholes model, which requires various assumptions as inputs. This method is now required under accounting rules.

In 2002, another method was suggested: expensing the options at the difference between the market price and the strike price when the options are exercised, and not expensing options which are not exercised, and reflecting the unexercised options as a liability on the balance sheet. This method, which defers the expense, was also requested by companies. A method to eventually reconcile the grant date fair-value estimates with the eventual exercise price was also proposed.

Stock options under International Financial Reporting Standards are addressed by IFRS 2 Share-based Payments. For transactions with employees and others providing similar services, the entity is required to measure the fair value of the equity instruments granted at the grant date. In the absence of market prices, fair value is estimated using a valuation technique to estimate what the price of those equity instruments would have been on the measurement date in an arm's length transaction between knowledgeable, willing parties. The standard does not specify which particular model should be used.

=== Fair-value method journal entries for stock option compensation ===
- Grant date (if warrants are not vested when granted)

No journal entry

- Reporting dates, until vested (if warrants are not vested when granted)

Debit compensation expense.

Credit paid in capital – stock warrants.

If the warrants eventually vest, the overall total compensation expense to recognize equals the fair value of the warrants on the grant date. The fair value of the warrants on the grant date is determined from the market or the Black-Scholes model. The expense is allocated to each income statement reporting period in proportion to the number of days in that period which are within the vesting period.

- Grant date (if warrants are vested when granted)

Debit compensation expense.

Credit paid in capital – stock warrants.

The fair value of the warrants on the grant date is determined from the market or the Black-Scholes model.

- Exercise of warrants

Debit cash.
Debit paid in capital – stock warrants.

Credit common stock – par value.
Credit paid in capital – common stock in excess of par value.

Cash is being collected from warrant holders. The related warrants being exercised are cleared out of the account for warrants outstanding. As stock is issued, common stock is put on the books -- affecting the accounts for common stock at par value, and the contributions for common stock that are in excess of the par value.

- Cancellation or expiration of warrants

Debit paid in capital – stock warrants.

Credit paid in capital – expired stock warrants.

=== Share based payments (stock appreciation rights) ===
As an alternative to stock warrants, companies may compensate their employees with stock appreciation rights (SARs). A single SAR is a right to be paid the amount by which the market price of one share of stock increases after a period of time. In this context, "appreciation" means the amount by which a stock price increases after a time period. In contrast with compensation by stock warrants, an employee does not need to pay an outlay of cash or own the underlying stock to benefit from a SAR plan. In arrangements where the holder may select the date on which to redeem the SARs, this plan is a form of stock option.

==== Journal entries for liability and expense of stock appreciation rights ====
- During the vesting period, at each reporting date

Determine the balance that would be due to holders of unvested SARs if they were vested with employees on the reporting date, and were being exercised by employees on the reporting date. This balance is computed from the trading price of the stock on the reporting date, the value above which the price of a share of stock needs to increase if the SAR holders will be entitled to a payout, and the number of SARs issued. Below, this will be referred to as the total expense to be recognized. At the end of each reporting period, the total expense to be recognized is an estimate of the future cash outflow to provide the payouts.

Multiply the total expense to be recognized – based on the appreciation of the share price as of the reporting date and the number of SARs issued – by the fraction of the vesting period completed. Deduct the expense previously recognized under the plan in prior periods. This is the compensation expense for SARs during the current period. (If the stock price has declined, the compensation expense for SARs thus computed may be negative, serving to increase the period income.) The liability accrued during the period equals the expense, and is accumulated in a liability under SAR plan account. That is to say that the journal entry to recognize a positive compensation expense related to SARs consists of a debit to compensation expense and a credit to liability under SAR plan.

- After the vesting period

The current expense (or contra-expense) recognized is the change in liability under the plan, based on the movement of the stock's market price. Now that the SARs are vested, the booked liability account should be kept equal to the total expense to be recognized. As stated before, total expense to be recognized refers to an estimate, because the price of the stock is likely to change before the SARs are redeemed for cash. Again, the journal entry to recognize a positive compensation expense related to SARs consists of a debit to compensation expense and a credit to liability under SAR plan.

- When rights are redeemed

The company closes the liability under SAR plan account, and pays the balance with cash.

== Practicalities ==
Opponents of the system note that the eventual value of the reward to the recipient of the option (hence the eventual value of the incentive payment made by the company) is difficult to account for in advance of its realisation.

== Intrinsic value or fair value ==
The FASB has moved against "Opinion 25", which left it open to businesses to monetise options according to their 'intrinsic value', rather than their 'fair value'. The preference for fair value appears to be motivated by its voluntary adoption by several major listed businesses, and the need for a common standard of accounting.

== Accountabilities of Financial Accounting Standards Board ==
Opposition to the adoption of expensing has provoked some challenges towards the unusual, independent status of the FASB as a non-governmental regulatory body, notably a motion put to the US Senate to strike down "statement 123".

== See also ==
- Convertible security
- Employee stock ownership plan
- Employee stock purchase plan
- IFRS 2
- Incentive stock option
- Insider trading
- Non-qualified stock option
- Profit sharing
- Restricted stock units
- Stock dilution

== Sources ==
- FASB statement 123
