= Compensation and benefits =

Rewards for employees and specialty of human resources

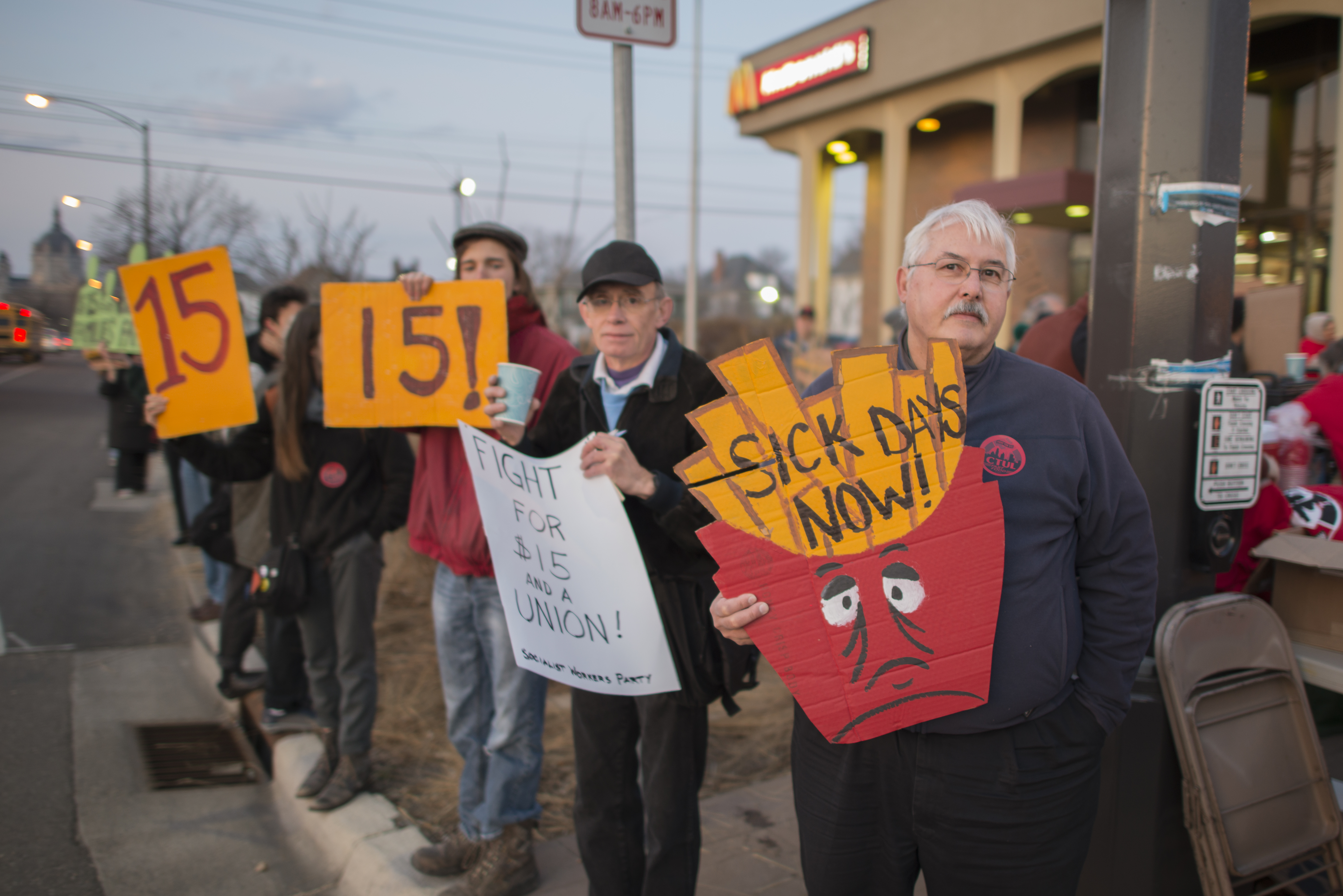
Fast food workers in Minnesota on strike for higher minimum wage and improved benefits.

Compensation and benefits refer to remuneration provided by employers to employees for work performed. In the United States, it is commonplace for a significant amount of a worker's earnings to manifest as benefits; in 2012, among those working in wholesale trade, approximately one third of remuneration was through benefits.

Compensation is the direct monetary payment received for work, commonly referred to as wages. It includes various financial forms such as salary, hourly wages, overtime pay, sign-on bonuses, merit and retention bonuses, commissions, incentive or performance-based pay, and restricted stock units (RSUs). Benefits refer to non-monetary rewards offered by employers, which supplement base pay and contribute to employee well-being and satisfaction. These benefits may include health insurance, retirement savings plans, paid time off (PTO), and childcare support.

In the United States, workers often seek employers with desirable benefits, especially healthcare, which is one of the most sought-after benefits.

== Components of pay ==
Employee compensation and benefits are divided into four basic categories: guaranteed pay, variable pay, benefits, and equity-based compensation. There are also other ways workers may be compensated, such as intangible benefits.

=== Guaranteed pay ===
Guaranteed pay is a fixed monetary reward to be given to the worker, to be consistently paid even when there is no work to be done. The most common form of guaranteed pay is base salary.

With a base salary, the worker is paid on an hourly, daily, weekly, bi-weekly, semi-monthly or monthly rate. Base salary is provided for doing the job the employee is hired to do, unconditional on performance or circumstance. Many countries, provinces, states or cities dictate a minimum wage.

In addition to base salary, allowances may be paid to an employee for specific purposes other than performing the job. These can include allowances for transportation, housing, meals, cost of living, seniority, or as payments in lieu of medical or pension benefits. The use of allowances varies widely by country, as well as job level and the nature of job duties.

=== Variable pay ===
Variable pay is a non-fixed monetary (cash) reward that is contingent on discretion, performance, or results achieved. There are different types of variable pay, including sales commission, productivity-based bonuses, piece-rate pay, and performance-related pay.An example where this type of pay is used is the real estate industry, where employees can receive commission, bonus, or incentive payments in addition to the minimum weekly wage.

=== Benefits ===
There are a wide variety of benefits offered to employees such as Paid Time-Off (PTO), various types of insurance (such as life, medical, dental, and disability), participation in a retirement plan (such as pension or 401(k)), or access to a company car, among others. Some benefits are mandatory which are regulated by the government while others are voluntarily offered to fulfill the need of a specific employee population. Benefit plans are typically not provided in cash but form the basis of an employees' pay package along with base salary and bonus. In some areas, preference for employers who offer benefits varies between gender, with women preferring additional benefits.

In the United States, "qualified" employee benefit plans must be offered to all employees, while "non-qualified" benefit plans may be offered to a select group such as executives or other highly-paid employees. When implementing a benefit plan, HR Departments must ensure compliance with federal and state regulations. Many states and countries dictate different minimum benefits such as minimum paid time-off, employer's pension contribution, sick pay, among others.

In the United Kingdom, salary sacrifice arrangements are used to provide non-cash benefits. An agreement is put in place to reduce an employee's entitlement to cash pay in return for the non-cash benefit. The arrangement must not reduce the employee's cash earnings below the National Minimum Wage (NMW) threshold.

=== Equity-based compensation ===
Equity-based compensation is an employer compensation plan using the employer's shares as employee compensation. The most common form is stock options, yet employers use additional vehicles such as restricted stock, restricted stock units (RSU), employee stock purchase plan (ESPP), performance shares (PSU) and stock appreciation rights (SAR). A stock option is defined as "a contract right granted to an individual to purchase a certain number of shares of stock at a certain price (and subject to certain conditions) over a defined period of time." Performance shares (PSU) awards of company stock given to managers and executives only if specified organization performance criteria are met, such as earnings per share target

=== Other benefits ===
An employee may receive intangible benefits, such as a desirable work schedule. That could be a schedule that is controlled by the employee and can be adjusted to accommodate occasional non-work activities, or one that is highly predictable, which makes it easier for the employee to arrange childcare or transportation to work.

Access to training programs, mentorship, opportunities to travel or to meet other people in the same field, and similar experiences are all intangible benefits that may appeal to some employees.

== Pay aggregates ==
Various combinations of the aforementioned categories are referred to as pay aggregates. Common aggregates are explained below.

Total cash compensation combines fixed or base pay with variable cash pay, such as bonuses or other incentive payments. In sales compensation, pay mix refers to how target total compensation is divided between base pay and target incentive.

Total guaranteed package or fixed cost to company are aggregates that include guaranteed pay and benefits. This represents the total fixed cost of the reward package and is useful for budgeting. All forms of variable pay (annual bonus and equity compensation) are excluded from this aggregate.

Total direct compensation refers to total cash compensation plus the grant value of long-term incentives.

Total rewards include compensation and benefits, as well as work-life support, performance and recognition, and development and career opportunities.

== See also ==
- Reward management
