= Employee stock ownership plans in the United States =

In the United States, there is a widespread practice of employee stock ownership. It began with industrial companies and today is particularly common in the technology sector but also companies in other industries, such as Starbucks.

== Types ==
Employee stock ownership plans (ESOPs) were developed as a method of employee compensation and incentivization. Many of the early proponents of ESOPs believed that capitalism's viability depended upon continued growth and that there was no better way for economies to grow than by distributing the benefits of that growth to the workforce.

Employee stock purchase plans (ESPPs) are a program run by companies for their employees, enabling them to purchase company shares at a discounted price. These schemes may or may not qualify as tax efficient.

In the U.S., stock options granted to employees are of two forms, that differ primarily in their tax treatment. They may be either:

- Incentive stock options (ISOs)
- Non-qualified stock options (NQSOs or NSOs)

== History ==
In the mid-19th century, as the United States transitioned to an industrial economy, national corporations like Procter & Gamble, Railway Express Agency, Sears & Roebuck, and others recognized that someone could work for the companies for 20 plus years, reach an old age and then have no income after they could no longer work. The leaders of those 19th century companies decided to set aside stock in the company that would be given to employees when they retired.

In 1956, Louis Kelso invented the first ESOP, which allowed the employees of Peninsula Newspapers to buy out the company founders. Chairman of the Senate Finance Committee, Senator Russell Long, a Democrat from Louisiana, helped develop tax policy for ESOPs within the Employee Retirement Income Security Act of 1974 (ERISA), calling it one of his most important accomplishments in his career. ESOPs also attracted interest of Republican leaders including Barry Goldwater, Richard Nixon, Gerald Ford, and Ronald Reagan.

According to data collected by the United States Department of Labor, there are roughly 6,237 companies with an ESOP, including a number of prominent companies. For example, the Engineering and Architectural company Burns & McDonnell has been 100% employee-owned through an ESOP since 1985. Other examples of ESOPs include Wawa, Publix, and W. L. Gore & Associates.

In his 2020 Presidential campaign, Bernie Sanders proposed that 20% of stocks in corporations with over $100 million in annual revenue be owned by the corporation's workers.

== See also ==
- Employee stock option
- Employee stock ownership
