= Golden handcuffs =

Large financial benefits for employee retention

Golden handcuffs, a phrase first recorded in 1976, refers to financial allurements and benefits that have the objective to encourage highly compensated employees to remain within a company or organization instead of moving from company to company (or organization to organization) (opposite of a golden parachute). Golden handcuffs come in different forms, such as employee stock options or restricted stock, which endow only when the employee has been with the company or organization for a certain number of years, and contractual agreements, consisting of bonuses or other forms of benefits which must be repaid to the company if the employee leaves before the date agreed on. Golden handcuffs are frequently used for jobs that require rare and specialized skills or in a "tight labor market", where jobs are more common than workers. In any case, although they are very expensive, they are usually less expensive than the cost to replace a particular employee. Golden handcuffs often receive scrutiny from shareholders and directors.

== Impacts ==
Golden handcuffs benefit employees, as they are of significantly higher value than their annual salary. The experience that follows an agreement of this sort may be draining and abhorrent, which is why the contract must be thoroughly analysed and considered until an intelligent conclusion or compensation, that benefits both the company and the employee, is agreed upon. Often, employees feel the urge to remain within the company they've been working with, even though it may not seem like the smartest choice, objectively, because of tradition, relationships or a simple feeling of belonging. When different opportunities are offered to an employee, generally the choice is made by a mix of objective and subjective views, where they must prioritize every aspect of their opportunities in order to arrive at a beneficial solution. These sorts of agreements might potentially impose penalties if the employee decides to leave the company before the contracted date, such as the repayment of bonuses. Often included in these contracts are non-disclosure agreements (NDAs), where the employee is prohibited from communicating sensitive corporate information, and non-compete clauses, where working for competitors is forbidden for the employee after leaving.

== Structure ==
Top talent is rare, so companies often negotiate deals in order to retain key employees. Golden handcuffs constitute one of several ways to prevent key employees from leaving, making it financially unprofitable for them to walk away from their employers. Such deals are usually done with stock options, phantom stock or deferred payments. Phantom stock usually gives the best results, as it gives an employee of a company using the technique a motive for staying with the company and making it grow, since the stock increases in value alongside the company. To create a contract that benefits both the employee and the company, a legal team is contacted in order to discuss available options, and key employees are distinguished from others. A funding mechanism is put in place by the company (if privately held), where obligations are present. Tax repercussions should be minimized for the money set aside, usually using insurance as main funding mechanism. If designed perfectly, the corporation can manage to receive all its money back after paying the employee.

== Typical arrangements ==
=== Salary reduction and bonus deferral ===
These two types of arrangements follow the 401k style where an executive can defer salaries and bonuses annually.

=== Retirement money withdrawal ===
At retirement, or in the general future, money can be withdrawn and the executive can support his or her savings using pre-tax capital.

=== SERP (Supplemental Executive Retirement Plan) ===
Also known as a "Top Hat" program, a SERP is funded by the employer and consists of a retirement plan that implements benefits apart from those covered in other retirement plans such as IRA (Individual Retirement Account), 401(k) or NQDC plans. Unlike many other types of employer benefits, a SERP usually is not required to be offered to all employees, nor are there contribution limits established by the Internal Revenue Service.

=== Excess Benefit Plans ===
Excess Benefit Plans are NQDC plans that grant benefits only to employees whose benefits are limited by section 415 of the IRS. These limitations diminish the volume of benefit that some highly paid employees profit from amounts they might differently be able to gain without these constraints.

== See also ==
- Golden handshake
- Golden parachute
