= BDO USA =

American accounting firm

BDO USA, P.C.
- Type: ESOP corporation
- Industry: Professional services
- Founded: 1910
- Headquarters: One Prudential Plaza, Chicago, Illinois
- Key people: Natalie Kotlyar (Board Chair); Matthew Becker (CEO); Stephen Ferrara (COO); Catherine Moy (CPO)
- Products: Assurance Services; Accounting Services; Tax Advisory; Tax Planning; Tax Compliance; Consulting Services; Management Consulting; Risk Advisory; IT Consulting
- Revenue: ▲$2.82 billion (USA) (2024)
- Number of employees: 11,000+ (2025)
- Website: www.bdo.com

BDO USA, P.C. is the 8th largest accounting and professional services firm in the United States by revenue. It is the United States member firm of BDO International.

In 2023, BDO USA, P.C. took a loan of $1.3 billion from Apollo Global Management in order to convert from a traditional limited liability partnership to an employee owned corporation. The majority of the borrowed amount was distributed to senior equity owners of BDO USA in exchange for their partnership units. This conversion is currently the subject of a class action lawsuit against BDO USA, P.C., its board of directors, and the ESOP trustees.

The company is currently headquartered in downtown Chicago. BDO stands for Binder, Dijker, and Otte, the original founders of the firm.

== History ==
BDO USA, P.C was founded as Seidman and Seidman in New York City in 1910 by three immigrant brothers: Maximillian L. Seidman, Francis E. Seidman, and Jacob S. Seidman. At that time the accounting profession was in its infancy, with fewer than 2,200 practicing CPAs in the United States. Shortly thereafter in 1913, the Sixteenth Amendment to the United States Constitution was ratified, followed by the Revenue Act of 1913 with new impositions of U.S. federal income tax enacted by Congress in that year. M. L. Seidman saw the potential of the accountant's role to provide tax services to individuals. By 1917, Congress enacted the first revenue bills and the U.S. entry into World War I created the need for corporate income and excess profit taxes. At the same time, federal spending rose to $18.9 billion, with 58 percent of federal revenues provided by income taxes. M.L. Seidman and his siblings, who joined him in his new accounting firm, seized the opportunity to provide tax services to businesses in addition to individuals.

=== Expansion ===
An era of expansion began. Fostered by the federal government's conversion of furniture and woodworking companies to aircraft production for the war effort, the firm opened an office in Grand Rapids, Michigan, in 1917. Seidman and Seidman quickly established itself as a leader in serving the furniture industry by developing the first effective furniture plant costing system. Today, BDO Seidman's furniture industry practice remains in use in the industry.

In 1925, the firm rapidly expanded, opening offices in Jamestown, Illinois, and Rockford, Illinois, followed by Chicago in 1921, and Gardner, Massachusetts, in 1924. In 1922, J. S. Seidman joined the firm as a founding member.

The 1930s brought another new beginning for the accounting profession. In 1933, Congress passed the Securities Act, requiring public corporations to have financial statements included in registration statements and periodic reports reported on by independent CPAs. A year later, the Securities and Exchange Commission was created to administer the new legislation.

In 1950, L. William Seidman joined the firm and ultimately became its managing partner before leaving for government service, most notably as chair of the FDIC.

=== Development of the national firm ===
The firm continued to grow, and by the 1960s, truly became a national firm. On April 1, 1968, the firm was converted into a national general partnership. This marked the beginning of a new era of expansion. Over the years to the present, the firm established many offices throughout the United States.

== Present ==
Today, BDO USA, P.C. has more than 75 offices and more than 400 independent alliance firm locations nationwide. During this timeframe, BDO International was created and has grown to become the fifth largest accounting and consulting network in the world with over 1,591 member firm offices in 162 countries.

In February 2009, BDO USA, P.C. launched the firm's first-ever national advertising campaign: "People Who Know, Know BDO".

In June 2012, Joseph A. Smith Jr., the monitor of the National Mortgage Settlement announced that he had engaged BDO USA, P.C. as his primary professional firm. BDO joined the monitor and his team for a period of three and a half years overseeing implementation of the historic National Mortgage Settlement involving 49 states, the United States government and five of the nation's largest banks.

In July 2020, BDO USA, P.C. launched Athenagy, a proprietary business intelligence platform for legal professionals.

In July 2023, BDO USA, LLP changed from a traditional limited liability partnership to a professional services corporation and was renamed to BDO USA, P.C.

== Controversies ==
In June 2012, BDO USA paid a $34.4 million penalty to the IRS as part of a larger $50 million settlement for violations related to tax shelters, which involved failing to register certain shelters and assisting high-income taxpayers in evading taxes.

In September 2023, BDO USA and two partners, Kevin Olvera and Michael Musick, were sanctioned by the PCAOB for violating audit rules and standards, specifically for failing to properly evaluate significant estimates related to the company's revenue and accounts receivable. This resulted in a civil fine of over $2 million. Both partners remain with the firm.

In 2024, BDO USA paid a $2.25 million settlement to resolve a class action lawsuit alleging violations of the Employee Retirement Income Security Act (ERISA) for mismanaging and failing to adequately evaluate and secure investments for its 401(k) plan.

In May 2024, the Public Company Accounting Oversight Board (PCAOB) released their annual inspection report of BDO USA, P.C. and determined that 86.2% of audits reviewed were deficient. This was dramatically higher than the average deficiency rate of 25.5% by the Big 4 for the same year. This caused significant media coverage and uncertainty about the capabilities of BDO USA, P.C.’s services.

In February 2025, the PCAOB released their annual inspection report of BDO USA, P.C. and determined that 60% of audits reviewed were deficient. While this was an improvement over the previous year, it was still significantly higher than its peers which had an average deficiency rate of 19.5%.

In January 2025, a $1.3 billion class action lawsuit was filed against BDO USA and its ESOP trustees for allegedly violating ERISA by selling company stock to the ESOP at an inflated price. The lawsuit, filed by participants and beneficiaries, claimed the valuation was based on overstated revenues and included self-dealing transactions that benefited executives, to the detriment of employees. The complaint alleges that the sale, using funds from Apollo Global Management, reflected a flawed valuation of the company based on inflated earnings and unreasonable projections.

In 2025, BDO's audit client, First Brands, went bankrupt months after receiving an unqualified opinion. First Brands had billions of dollars in unrecorded liabilities that were not detected by BDO. Going Concern, an accounting blog, published an article questioning BDO's decision to layoff employees shortly before the audit. The article also questioned the private equity firm Apollo simultaneously financing BDO and shorting the stock of First Brands. In response, BDO accused Going Concern of defamation and threatened litigation.
