= Blackout period =

Blackout period may refer to:

- a term used in context of Employee stock option Valuation
- alternative phrase for Election silence
