= Fulmati Nyaya rape case =

2002 Fulmati Nyaya rape case
- Location: 28.7375753°N 80.5816387°E; Banbehda, Kailali District, Nepal
- Date: April 2002
- Target: Fulmati Nyaya
- Attack type: Explicit sexual acts, Rape
- Injuries: Sexual assault (Rape)
- Victim: Fulmati Nyaya
- Perpetrators: Armed Police Force and Royal Nepalese Army

The Fulmati Nyaya rape case involved the rape, child labor and torture of 14 year old girl, pseudonym Fulmati Nyaya, a member of an indigenous community living in the southern region of Terai, by Armed Police Force and Royal Nepalese Army in April 2002 during the Nepalese Civil War in Kailai District of Nepal.

Ms. Nyaya was arrested from her home in Kailali district on 2 April 2002 and was detained at the Army Barracks in Teghari, Kailali. She was repeatedly raped, tortured with explicit sexual acts, and subjected to verbal abuse under the pretext of extracting confessions. Later, on 12 April 2002, she was transferred to Bakimalika Battalion of the Armed Police Forece Banbeheda, Kailali. She was released in June 2002.

From January 2011 to 17 April 2014, Ms Nyaya filed various complaints in the domestic courts and with governments regarding arbitrary detentions and ill-treatment she faced. Failing to obtain justice, on 20 June 2014, Ms. Fulmati submitted an individual communication to the United Nations Human Rights Committee (HRC) supported by TRIAL International. The committee reached decision on 18 March 2019 finding Nepal responsible for violation of several rights enshrined in International Covenant on Civil and Political Rights, including the prohibition of tortured, cruel inhuman or degrading treatment, forced labor, and the right to liberty and security. In addition, HRC gave recommendation to the Nepal Government in the adaptation of 'the definition of rape and other forms of sexual violence in accordance with international standards', prompt, impartial and effective investigation in cases of rape and other forms of sexual violence, an apology from the State in a private ceremony, the removal of statute limitation that hinder the filing of complaints by the victims of sexual violence and effective access to justice, reparation, and compensation in cases of conflict-related sexual violence, among others.
