= Employee stock option =

Option for employee to share in company stock

Employee stock options (ESO or ESOPs) is a label that refers to compensation contracts between an employer and an employee that carries some characteristics of financial options.

Employee stock options are commonly viewed as an internal agreement providing the possibility to participate in the share capital of a company, granted by the company to an employee as part of the employee's remuneration package. Regulators and economists have since specified that ESOs are compensation contracts.

These nonstandard contracts exist between an employee and employer, under which the employer is obligated to deliver a specified number of shares if the employee chooses to exercise their stock options. The contract length varies, and often carries terms that may change depending on the employer and the current employment status of the employee. In the United States, the terms are detailed within an employer's "Stock Option Agreement for Incentive Equity Plan". Essentially, this is an agreement which grants the employee eligibility to purchase a limited amount of stock at a predetermined price. The resulting shares that are granted are typically restricted stock. There is no obligation for the employee to exercise the option, in which case the option will lapse.

AICPA's Financial Reporting Alert describes these contracts as amounting to a "short" position in the employer's equity, unless the contract is tied to some other attribute of the employer's balance sheet. To the extent the employer's position can be modeled as a type of option, it is most often modeled as a "short position in a call". From the employee's point of view, the compensation contract provides a conditional right to buy the equity of the employer and when modeled as an option, the employee's perspective is that of a "long position in a call option".

== Objectives ==
Many companies use employee stock options plans to retain, reward, and attract employees, the objective being to give employees an incentive to behave in ways that will boost the company's stock price. The employee could exercise the option, pay the exercise price and would be issued with ordinary shares in the company. As a result, the employee would experience a direct financial benefit of the difference between the market and the exercise prices.

Stock options are also used as golden handcuffs if their value has increased drastically. An employee leaving the company would also effectively be leaving behind a large amount of potential cash, subject to restrictions as defined by the company. These restrictions, such as vesting and non-transferring, attempt to align the holder's interest with those of the business shareholders.

Another substantial reason that companies issue employee stock options as compensation is to preserve and generate cash flow. The cash flow comes when the company issues new shares and receives the exercise price and receives a tax deduction equal to the "intrinsic value" of the ESOs when exercised.

Employee stock options are offered differently based on position and role at the company, as determined by the company. Management typically receives the most as part of their executive compensation package. ESOs may also be offered to non-executive level staff, especially by businesses that are not yet profitable, insofar as they may have few other means of compensation. Alternatively, employee-type stock options can be offered to non-employees: suppliers, consultants, lawyers and promoters for services rendered.

== Features ==
=== Overview ===
Over the course of employment, a company generally issues employee stock options to an employee which can be exercised at a particular price set on the grant day, generally a public company's current stock price or a private company's most recent valuation, such as an independent 409A valuation commonly used within the United States. Depending on the vesting schedule and the maturity of the options, the employee may elect to exercise the options at some point, obligating the company to sell the employee its stock shares at whatever stock price was used as the exercise price. At that point, the employee may either sell public stock shares, attempt to find a buyer for private stock shares (either an individual, specialized company, or secondary market), or hold on to it in the hope of further price appreciation.

=== Contract differences ===
Employee stock options may have some of the following differences from standardized, exchange-traded options:

- Exercise price: The exercise price is non-standardized and is usually the current price of the company stock at the time of issue. Alternatively, a formula may be used, such as sampling the lowest closing price over a 30-day window on either side of the grant date. On the other hand, choosing an exercise at grant date equal to the average price for the next sixty days after the grant would eliminate the chance of back dating and spring loading. Often, an employee may have ESOs exercisable at different times and different exercise prices.
- Quantity: Standardized stock options typically have 100 shares per contract. ESOs usually have some non-standardized amount.
- Vesting: Initially if X number of shares are granted to employee, then all X may not be in his account.
  - Some or all of the options may require that the employee continue to be employed by the company for a specified term of years before "vesting", i.e. selling or transferring the stock or options. Vesting may be granted all at once ("cliff vesting") or over a period time ("graded vesting"), in which case it may be "uniform" (e.g. 20% of the options vest each year for 5 years) or "non-uniform" (e.g. 20%, 30% and 50% of the options vest each year for the next three years).
  - Some or all of the options may require a certain event to occur, such as an initial public offering of the stock, or a change of control of the company.
  - The schedule may change pending the employee or the company having met certain performance goals or profits (e.g., a 10% increase in sales).
  - It is possible for some options to time-vest but not performance-vest. This can create an unclear legal situation about the status of vesting and the value of options at all.
- Liquidity: ESOs for private companies are not traditionally liquid, as they are not publicly traded.
- Duration (Expiration): ESOs often have a maximum maturity that far exceeds the maturity of standardized options. It is not unusual for ESOs to have a maximum maturity of 10 years from date of issue, while standardized options usually have a maximum maturity of about 30 months. If the holder of the ESOs leaves the company, it is not uncommon for this expiration date to be moved up to 90 days.
- Non-transferable: With few exceptions, ESOs are generally not transferable and must either be exercised or allowed to expire worthless on expiration day. There is a substantial risk that when the ESOs are granted (perhaps 50%) that the options will be worthless at expiration. This should encourage the holders to reduce risk by selling exchange traded call options. In fact it is the only efficient way to manage those speculative ESOs and SARs. Wealth Managers generally advise early exercise of ESOs and SARs, then sell and diversify.
- Over the counter: Unlike exchange traded options, ESOs are considered a private contract between the employer and employee. As such, those two parties are responsible for arranging the clearing and settlement of any transactions that result from the contract. In addition, the employee is subjected to the credit risk of the company. If for any reason the company is unable to deliver the stock against the option contract upon exercise, the employee may have limited recourse. For exchange-trade options, the fulfillment of the option contract is guaranteed by the Options Clearing Corp.
- Tax issues: There are a variety of differences in the tax treatment of ESOs having to do with their use as compensation. These vary by country of issue but in general, ESOs are tax-advantaged with respect to standardized options. See below.
  - In the U.S., stock options granted to employees are of two forms that differ primarily in their tax treatment. They may be either:
    - Incentive stock options (ISOs)
    - Non-qualified stock options (NQSOs or NSOs)
  - In the UK, there are various approved tax and employee share schemes, including Enterprise Management Incentives (EMIs). (Employee share schemes that aren’t approved by the UK government don’t have the same tax advantages.)

== Valuation ==
As of 2006, the International Accounting Standards Board (IASB) and the Financial Accounting Standards Board (FASB) agree that the fair value at the grant date should be estimated using an option pricing model. Here, via requisite modifications, the model should incorporate the features described above. In general—due to these—the value of the ESO will typically "be much less than [standard] prices for corresponding market-traded options".

In discussing the valuation, FAS 123 Revised (A15)—which does not prescribe a specific valuation model—states that:

a lattice model can be designed to accommodate dynamic assumptions of expected volatility and dividends over the option's contractual term, and estimates of expected option exercise patterns during the option's contractual term, including the effect of blackout periods. Therefore, the design of a lattice model more fully reflects the substantive characteristics of a particular employee share option or similar instrument. Nevertheless, both a lattice model and the Black–Scholes–Merton formula, as well as other valuation techniques that meet the requirements ... can provide a fair value estimate that is consistent with the measurement objective and fair-value-based method....

The IASB reference to "contractual term" requires that the model incorporates the effect of vesting on the valuation. As above, option holders may not exercise their option prior to their vesting date, and during this time the option is effectively European in the method currently followed. "Blackout periods", similarly, requires that the model recognizes that the option may not be exercised during the quarter (or other period) preceding the release of financial results (or other corporate event), when employees would be precluded from trade in company securities; see Insider trading. During other times, exercise would be allowed, and the option is effectively American there. Given this pattern, the ESO, in total, is therefore a Bermudan option. Note that employees leaving the company prior to vesting will forfeit unvested options, which results in a decrease in the company's liability, and this too must be incorporated into the valuation.

The reference to "expected exercise patterns" is to what is sometimes called "suboptimal early exercise behavior". Here, regardless of theoretical considerations—see Rational pricing § Options—employees are assumed to exercise when they are sufficiently "in the money". This is usually proxied as the share price exceeding a specified multiple of the strike price; this multiple, in turn, is often an empirically determined average for the company or industry in question (as is the rate of employees exiting the company). "Suboptimal", as it is this behavior which results in the above reduction in value, relative to standard options.

The preference for lattice models is that these break the problem into discrete sub-problems, and hence different rules and behaviors may be applied at the various time/price combinations as appropriate. (The binomial model is the simplest and most common lattice model.) The "dynamic assumptions of expected volatility and dividends", e.g. expected changes to dividend policy, as well as of forecast changes in interest rates as consistent with today's term structure, may also be incorporated in a lattice model; although a finite difference model would be more correctly (if less easily) applied in these cases. See contingent claim valuation for further discussion.

Black–Scholes may be applied to ESO valuation, but with an important consideration: option maturity is substituted with an "effective time to exercise", reflecting the impact on value of vesting, employee exits and suboptimal exercise. For modelling purposes, where Black–Scholes is used, this number is (often) based on SEC Filings of comparable companies. For reporting purposes, it can be found by calculating the ESO's Fugit, "the (risk-neutral) expected life of the option", directly from the lattice, or back-solved such that Black–Scholes returns a given lattice-based result (see Greeks (finance) § Theta).

A KPMG study (from 2012) suggests that most ESO valuations use either Black–Scholes or a lattice model, as adjusted to incorporate the features of typical ESOs. The more specialized Hull–White model (2004) is also widely employed, while the work of Carpenter (1998) is acknowledged as the first attempt at a "thorough treatment"; see also Rubinstein (1995). These are essentially modifications of the standard binomial model (although may sometimes be implemented as a trinomial tree). Often, the inputs to the pricing model may be difficult to determine—usually stock volatility, expected time to expiration, and relevant exercise multiples—and a variety of commercial services are offered here. See below for calculation resources.

== Accounting and taxation treatment ==
=== General accepted accounting principles in the United States (GAAP) ===
The US GAAP accounting model for employee stock options and similar share-based compensation contracts changed substantially in 2005 as FAS123 (revised) began to take effect. According to US generally accepted accounting principles in effect before June 2005, principally FAS123 and its predecessor APB 25, stock options granted to employees did not need to be recognized as an expense on the income statement when granted if certain conditions were met, although the cost (expressed under FAS123 as a form of the fair value of the stock option contracts) was disclosed in the notes to the financial statements.

This allows a potentially large form of employee compensation to not show up as an expense in the current year, and therefore, currently overstate income. Many assert that over-reporting of income by methods such as this by American corporations was one contributing factor in the Stock Market Downturn of 2002.

Employee stock options have to be expensed under US GAAP in the US. Each company must begin expensing stock options no later than the first reporting period of a fiscal year beginning after June 15, 2005. As most companies have fiscal years that are calendars, for most companies this means beginning with the first quarter of 2006. As a result, companies that have not voluntarily started expensing options will only see an income statement effect in fiscal year 2006. Companies will be allowed, but not required, to restate prior-period results after the effective date. This will be quite a change versus before, since options did not have to be expensed in case the exercise price was at or above the stock price (intrinsic value based method APB 25). Only a disclosure in the footnotes was required. Intentions from the international accounting body IASB indicate that similar treatment will follow internationally.

As above, "Method of option expensing: SAB 107", issued by the SEC, does not specify a preferred valuation model, but 3 criteria must be met when selecting a valuation model: The model is applied in a manner consistent with the fair value measurement objective and other requirements of FAS123R; is based on established financial economic theory and generally applied in the field; and reflects all substantive characteristics of the instrument (i.e. assumptions on volatility, interest rate, dividend yield, etc.) need to be specified.

=== Taxation ===
Most employee stock options in the US are non-transferable and they are not immediately exercisable although they can be readily hedged to reduce risk. Unless certain conditions are satisfied, the IRS considers that their "fair market value" cannot be "readily determined", and therefore "no taxable event" occurs when an employee receives an option grant. For a stock option to be taxable upon grant, the option must either be actively traded or it must be transferable, immediately exercisable, and the fair market value of the option must be readily ascertainable. Depending on the type of option granted, the employee may or may not be taxed upon exercise. Non-qualified stock options (those most often granted to employees) are taxed upon exercise as standard income. Incentive stock options (ISO) are not but are subject to Alternative Minimum Tax (AMT), assuming that the employee complies with certain additional tax code requirements. Most importantly, shares acquired upon exercise of ISOs must be held for at least one year after the date of exercise if the favorable capital gains tax are to be achieved. However, taxes can be delayed or reduced by avoiding premature exercises and holding them until near expiration day and hedging along the way. The taxes applied when hedging are friendly to the employee/optionee.

The Sharesave scheme is a tax-efficient employee stock option program in the United Kingdom.

==== Excess tax benefits from stock-based compensation ====
Differences between GAAP accounting and U.S. tax rules create a timing gap in how stock-based compensation is reflected on the profit-and-loss (P&L) statement. Under GAAP, companies must estimate the fair value of employee stock options on the grant date and recognize that amount as an expense over the vesting period. According to FASB ASC 718, “the grant-date fair value of the award shall be recognized as compensation cost over the requisite service period.” This reduces operating income and lowers the GAAP income tax provision.

For tax purposes, however, the IRS takes a different approach. Stock option deductions are only allowed when the options are exercised or expire and the actual taxable amount is known. The IRS states that “you may deduct the amount by which the fair market value of the stock exceeds the option price when the employee exercises the option.” Because of this timing difference, cash taxes paid in the period when the GAAP expense is recognized are often higher than the GAAP tax expense. The difference is recorded as a deferred tax asset on the balance sheet.

When the options are eventually exercised or expire, the actual tax deduction becomes known. If the deduction is larger than the amount originally estimated, the company records what is known as an “excess tax benefit”. PwC describes this adjustment as “the tax deduction in excess of the cumulative compensation cost recognized for financial reporting purposes”. This reduces income tax expense and increases net income in the period of exercise.

== Criticism ==
Alan Greenspan was critical of the structure of present-day options structure, so John Olagues created a new form of employee stock option called "dynamic employee stock options", which restructure the ESOs and SARs to make them far better for the employee, the employer and wealth managers.

Charlie Munger, vice-chairman of Berkshire Hathaway and chairman of Wesco Financial and the Daily Journal Corporation, has criticized conventional stock options for company management as "... capricious, as employees awarded options in a particular year would ultimately receive too much or too little compensation for reasons unrelated to employee performance. Such variations could cause undesirable effects, as employees receive different results for options awarded in different years", and for failing "to properly weigh the disadvantage to shareholders through dilution" of stock value. Munger believes profit-sharing plans are preferable to stock option plans.

According to Warren Buffett, investor Chairman & CEO of Berkshire Hathaway, "[t]here is no question in my mind that mediocre CEOs are getting incredibly overpaid. And the way it's being done is through stock options."

Other criticisms include:

1. Dilution can be very costly to shareholder over the long run.
2. Stock options are difficult to value.
3. Stock options can result in egregious compensation of executive for mediocre business results.
4. Retained earnings are not counted in the exercise price.
5. An individual employee is dependent on the collective output of all employees and management for a bonus.

=== Indexed options supporters ===
Other critics of (conventional) stock option plans in the US include supporters of "reduced-windfall" or indexed options for executive/management compensation. These include academics such as Lucian Bebchuk and Jesse Fried, institutional investor organizations the Institutional Shareholder Services and the Council of Institutional Investors, and business commentators.

Reduced-windfall options would adjust option prices to exclude "windfalls" such as falling interest rates, market and sector-wide share price movements, and other factors unrelated to the managers' own efforts. This can be done in a number of ways such as

- `indexing` or otherwise adjusting the exercise price of options to the average performance of the firm's particular industry to screen out broad market effects, (e.g. instead of issuing X many options with an exercise price equal to the current market price of $100, grant X many options whose strike price is $100 multiplied by an industry market index) or
- making the vesting of at least some options contingent on share price appreciation exceeding a certain benchmark (say, exceeding the appreciation of the shares of the bottom 20% of firm in the company's sector).

According to Lucian Bebchuk and Jesse Fried, "Options whose value is more sensitive to managerial performance are less favorable to managers for the same reasons that they are better for shareholders: Reduced-windfall options provide managers with less money or require them to cut managerial slack, or both."

However, as of 2002, only 8.5% of large public firms issuing options to executives conditioned even a portion of the options granted on performance.

A 1999 survey of the economics of executive compensation lamented that:

Despite the obvious attractive features of relative performance evaluation, it is surprisingly absent from US executive compensation practices. Why shareholders allow CEOs to ride bull markets to huge increases in their wealth is an open question.

=== Controversy ===
Stock option expensing has been surrounded in controversy since the early 1900s. The earliest attempts by accounting regulators to expense stock options were unsuccessful and resulted in the promulgation of FAS123 by the Financial Accounting Standards Board which required disclosure of stock option positions but no income statement expensing, per se. The controversy continued and in 2005, at the insistence of the SEC, the FASB modified the FAS123 rule to provide a rule that the options should be expensed as of the grant date. One misunderstanding is that the expense is at the fair value of the options. This is not true. The expense is indeed based on the fair value of the options but that fair value measure does not follow the fair value rules for other items which are governed by a separate set of rules under ASC Topic 820. In addition the fair value measure must be modified for forfeiture estimates and may be modified for other factors such as liquidity before expensing can occur. Finally the expense of the resulting number is rarely made on the grant date but in some cases must be deferred and in other cases may be deferred over time as set forth in the revised accounting rules for these contracts known as FAS123 (revised).

== See also ==
- Convertible security
- Employee stock ownership
- Employee stock purchase plan
- Incentive stock option
- Insider trading
- Non-qualified stock option
- Profit sharing
- Restricted stock
- Stock dilution
- Stock option expensing
- Sharesave, a tax-efficient employee stock option scheme in the United Kingdom
