= Sharing Ownership in the Workplace =

1985 book by Raymond Russell

- Cover
- Author: Raymond Russell
- Language: English
- Series: SUNY Series in the Sociology of Work
- Subject: Employee ownership
- Publisher: State University of New York Press
- Publication date: 1985
- Publication place: United States
- Media type: Print (hardcover and paperback)
- Pages: 267
- Awards: EGOS Award (1984)
- ISBN: 0-87395-998-1
- Dewey Decimal: 338.6
- LC Class: HD5650.R744 1985

Sharing Ownership in the Workplace is a 1985 book by the American sociologist Raymond Russell. It was published by the State University of New York Press in its SUNY Series in the Sociology of Work.

Russell examines employee ownership in the United States and abroad, working from a typology of how ownership can be shared and repeatedly returning to the tendency of worker-owned firms to "degenerate" into conventional companies. At the heart of the book are three case studies of organizations that had remained employee-owned for more than fifty years (the worker-owned scavenger companies of the San Francisco Bay Area, taxi cooperatives, and professional group practices). Beyond the case studies, Russell weighs the rise of Employee Stock Ownership Plans, worker buyouts, and independent contracting.

In 1984, the book won the inaugural EGOS Award of the American Sociological Association's Section on Organizations, Occupations, and Work.

== Summary ==
Worker ownership, Russell argues, is a recurring idea rather than a new one, advocated since the nineteenth century and pursued by governments across the political spectrum. He treats ownership not as one undivided right but as a "bundle of rights," and distinguishes two of them: equity, the economic claim on a firm's earnings and assets, and control, the political right to govern it. Crossing this distinction with a second one (whether rights are held collectively by a group or distributed to individuals) produces four categories: workers as stockholders (distributive equity), owning by belonging (collective equity), democracy in the workplace (collective control), and ownership expressed through the nature of work itself (distributive control). He applies this framework to a range of cases: producer cooperatives, the Israeli kibbutz and Histadrut, Soviet state ownership, Yugoslav workers' self-management, the Mondragón cooperatives, and the financing models proposed by Jaroslav Vanek and David Ellerman. In each of these cases, the problem the book is built around reappears: the tendency of labor-owned institutions to "degenerate" back into conventional firms that hire non-owner labor and sell out to outside investors.

The three case studies concern American organizations that had kept at least partial employee ownership for more than fifty years. The worker-owned scavenger companies of the San Francisco Bay Area, founded by northern Italian immigrants, combined shareholding, one-member-one-vote democracy, strong ethnic and family ties ("e cosa nostra," in the scavengers' phrase), and an entrepreneurial route system in which each crew sold services and collected its own bills. Russell attributes their gradual unraveling to several overlapping pressures rather than a single failure: new capital-intensive equipment, centralized computer billing, the recruitment of non-Italian helpers who were slow to be admitted as partners, discrimination lawsuits, and buyout offers from national waste-management "agglomerates." The taxi cooperatives, examined through Boston's Independent Taxi Operators Association and two in Los Angeles, show how local licensing rules shape outcomes: where cities license individual cabs through saleable medallions, or restrict cab ownership to cooperative members, those licenses become tradable assets that split members into single-cab owners and "minifleet" operators and encourage the use of hired drivers. In Los Angeles, a close-knit group of recent Soviet Jewish immigrants, pooling capital through informal loans, bought into the cooperatives at such a rate that they accelerated this process. The professional group practices (large law, medical, and accounting partnerships) are offered as the most stable of the three, because capital plays little role, partners' working-capital contributions are accounted for in detail, income is divided by "formula" or "percentage" systems tied to billings and business brought in, and "up-or-out" promotion ties skilled employees to the firm. Russell reads them through Oliver Williamson's idea of the "relational team."

Russell finds that all three are labor-intensive, hard-to-supervise service occupations in which self-employed labor is competitive, licensing forced practitioners to organize, and marketable licenses and capital equipment are the main engines of degeneration. The final chapter shifts to employee ownership created from above rather than below: divestitures of plants to their workers, the rapid post-1974 spread of Employee Stock Ownership Plans (ESOPs), and the displacement of employees by independent contractors and franchisees. Here Russell is more skeptical, noting that such arrangements tend to accompany wage concessions, union avoidance, overvalued stock, and the use of ESOPs as takeover defenses and instruments of managerial control. These "Greeks bearing gifts," he argues, differ from ownership that workers build for themselves. He believes that employee ownership gives workers little more power than they put into it, but predicts that the idea will remain on the national agenda because, before it was an answer to socialism or to Japan, "it was the American Dream."

== Critics ==
Robert N. Stern described the literature as divided along disciplinary lines and credited Russell with integrating theory and empirical research. He noted that the book had won the American Sociological Association's Organizations and Occupations Section award for the best work in the field. The honor, he said, was "well deserved." Stern emphasized Russell's thesis that "high levels of economic success rather than inefficiency may be a primary cause of cooperative degeneration." The surest protection against it, the book argues, is "work that requires ownership to control it." He faulted the closing treatment of ESOPs as familiar and dated by recent tax legislation. Other criticisms targeted repetition between chapters and what he considered a simplistic account of how unions regard employee ownership. Despite these faults, he placed the book "unquestionably among the best works dealing with employee ownership."

James Meehan valued the way the typology lets readers tell apart cooperatives, ESOPs, co-determination councils, kibbutzim, and quality-of-work-life programs that "may otherwise blur together." A concept endorsed by figures as far apart as Karl Marx and Ronald Reagan, he observed, "deserves careful scrutiny." He thought the author had illustrated the "microstructure" of worker-owned firms with skill, while leaving the larger "macrostructural" questions (how such firms interact with the wider economy) for another occasion. Meehan wished for fuller discussion of the internal-accounts system of the Mondragón cooperatives. He framed these as the basis for a hoped-for second volume rather than as flaws.

Robert Pankin asked whether cooperative and democratic relations could survive amid hierarchical and individualistic surroundings, and credited the book with identifying many of the factors that cause worker-ownership to degenerate. He praised its surveys, interviews, participant observation, and strong review of the historical and theoretical literature. His sharpest reservation concerned the chapter on professional partnerships, which he found "the weakest part of the book" and at times "forced." Such firms, he argued, were "a different breed of cat," explored through secondary literature rather than fieldwork. He noted that the forward-looking final chapter was "already out of date." Criticisms aside, his recommendation was warm and brief: "I learned from it."

Kuriakose Mamkoottam called the discussion of ownership and the nature of work "a particularly good review of literature concisely presented." His principal criticism was one of arrangement. The long theoretical surveys of the early chapters, he felt, "would have been better if the author had either integrated them with the empirical examples" or postponed them until after the data were presented. Mamkoottam likened Russell's approach to the deviant-case analysis in Lipset, Trow, and Coleman's earlier study of union democracy. He recommended the book as "good reading for all interested in the idea of industrial democracy and employee-involvement in enterprise management."

== Awards ==
- 1984: EGOS Award (inaugural recipient), American Sociological Association Section on Organizations, Occupations, and Work
