= Lock-up period =

Concept related to initial public offerings

A lock-up period, also known as a lock in, lock out, or locked up period, is a predetermined amount of time following an initial public offering (IPO) where large shareholders, such as company executives and venture capitalists, are restricted from selling their shares. Generally, a lock-up period is a condition of exercising an employee stock option. Depending on the company, the IPO lock-up period typically lasts between 90 and 180 days before these shareholders are allowed the right to exercise the option.

Lockups are designed to prevent insiders from liquidating assets too quickly after a company goes public. When employees and pre-IPO investors initially get their shares or options, they sign a contract with the company that typically prohibits trades for the first 90-180 days after a future IPO. When the company is ready to go public, the underwriting bank then reaffirms the existing agreements in new contracts. This helps to ensure the market will not disproportionately increase the supply, which drives prices downward.

While lock-up periods tend to be universal, this is not always the case. After its 2012 IPO, Facebook, Inc had different lock-up periods for different types of shareholders. For instance, original investors except Mark Zuckerberg were allowed to trade up to 271 million shares on August 16, while Zuckerberg were allowed to trade up to 60 million shares on November 14.
