= Alternative minimum tax =

United States tax law provision

The alternative minimum tax (AMT) is a tax imposed by the United States federal government in addition to the regular income tax for certain individuals, estates, and trusts. As of tax year 2018, the AMT raises about $5.2 billion, or 0.4% of all federal income tax revenue, affecting 0.1% of taxpayers, mostly in the upper income ranges.

An alternative minimum taxable income (AMTI) is calculated by taking the ordinary income and adding disallowed items and credits such as state and local tax deductions, interest on private-activity municipal bonds, the bargain element of incentive stock options, foreign tax credits, and home equity loan interest deductions. This broadens the base of taxable items. Many deductions, such as mortgage home loan interest and charitable deductions, are still allowed under AMT. The AMT is then imposed on this AMTI at a rate of 26% or 28%, with a much higher exemption than the regular income tax.

The Tax Cuts and Jobs Act of 2017 (TCJA) reduced the fraction of taxpayers who owed the AMT from 3% in 2017 to 0.1% in 2018, including from 27% to 0.4% of those earning $200,000 to $500,000 and from 61.9% to 2% of those earning $500,000 to $1,000,000.

The major reasons for the reduction of AMT taxpayers after TCJA include the capping of the state and local tax deduction (SALT) by the TCJA at $10,000, and a large increase in the exemption amount and phaseout threshold. A married couple earning $200,000 now requires over $50,000 of AMT adjustments to begin paying the AMT. The AMT previously applied in 2017 and earlier to many taxpayers earning from $200,000 to $500,000 because state and local taxes were fully deductible under the regular tax code but not at all under AMT. Despite the cap of the SALT deduction, the vast majority of AMT taxpayers paid less under the 2018 rules.

The AMT was originally designed to tax high-income taxpayers who used the regular tax system to pay little or no tax. Due to inflation and cuts in ordinary tax rates, a larger number of taxpayers began to pay the AMT. The number of households owing AMT rose from 200,000 in 1982 to 5.2 million in 2017, but was reduced back to 200,000 in 2018 by the TCJA.

== Alternative minimum tax calculation ==
Each year, high-income taxpayers must calculate and then pay the greater of an alternative minimum tax (AMT) or regular tax. The alternative minimum taxable income (AMTI) is calculated by taking the taxpayer's regular income and adding on disallowed credits and deductions such as the bargain element from incentive stock options, state and local tax deduction, foreign tax credits, and passive activity losses. The amount of the AMTI then determines how much of the exemption can be taken, which is subtracted from the AMTI. Finally, the AMTI minus the exemption is taxed at 26% or 28% depending on the level of income.

Table of 2025 AMT tax rates and exemptions for AMT income:

Status	Single	Married filing jointly	Married filing separately	Trust
26% tax rate	$0-$239,100	$0-$239,100	$0-$119,550	$0-$239,100
28% tax rate	$239,100+	$239,100+	$119,550	$239,100+
Exemption amount	$88,100	$137,000	$68,650	$25,000(?)
Exemption phase-out starts at (2025)	$626,350	$1,252,700	$626,350	$83,500(?)
No more exemption at (2025)	$978,750	$1,800,700	$900,950	$183,500(?)
Long-term capital gains rate	0%, 15%, 20%	0%, 15%, 20%	0%, 15%, 20%	0%, 15%, 20%

=== Example calculation ===
Alice is a single taxpayer who earns $100,000 of W-2 wage income in 2019. She also exercised and held (did not sell) 800 incentive stock options (ISOs) each for her employer, with a strike price of $100 and a current fair market value of $200. She thus incurs an additional $80,000 of bargain element that is not taxed under ordinary income, but is added to AMT income. She has no itemized deductions.

Alice thus must calculate income taxes twice:

Ordinary taxation

Alice calculates $15,246 in ordinary federal income taxes on $100,000: $100,000 - $12,200 standard deduction = $87,800 taxable income, at ordinary rates of 10%, 12%, 22%, 24%, would pay $15,246.50 in taxes.

Alternative minimum taxation

1. Alice takes her $100,000 ordinary income
2. Adds all AMT adjustments and exclusions. Here, she has $80,000 of incentive stock option bargain element which is taxable under AMT but not ordinary income, to reach a $180,000 AMT income
3. Alice's AMTI of $180,000 is under the 2019 exemption phaseout of $510,300 for single taxpayers, so she is entitled to the full exemption amount of $71,700.
4. Alice reduces her $180,000 AMTI by the $71,700 exemption to have $108,300 income that is applied solely at the 26% tax rate for an AMT tax burden of $28,158.

Because Alice's AMT tax burden of $28,158 is greater than her ordinary tax burden of $15,246, she pays a total of $28,158 in federal taxes (i.e., $15,246 in ordinary tax and $12,912 in AMT). Because ISO bargain element is a timing adjustment in AMT parlance, she is able to carry forward her $12,912 in AMT paid to tax year 2020 as a minimum tax credit, where she may receive a credit for the tax paid.

=== Specifics and adjustments ===
Due to the effect of the exemption phaseout, there are effective marginal tax rates of 32.5% and 35%. A lower tax rate continues to apply to long-term capital gains (and qualifying dividends). While the TCJA amended exemptions and phaseouts for single and married filers, it did not change it for trusts.

Under the AMT the standard deduction does not apply, but the AMT exemption does. State, local, and foreign taxes are not deductible. However, most other itemized deductions apply at least in part. Significant other adjustments to income and deductions apply. Individuals must file IRS Form 6251 if they have any net AMT due. The form is also filed to claim the credit for prior year AMT.

Other adjustments in computing AMT include:

- Miscellaneous itemized deductions are not allowed. These include all items subject to the 2% "floor", such as employee business expenses, tax preparation fees, etc.
- The home mortgage interest deduction is limited to interest on purchase money mortgages for a first and second residence.
- Medical expenses may be deducted only if they exceed 10% of Adjusted Gross Income, as compared to 7.5% for regular tax.
- The bargain element of an incentive stock option when exercised and the stock is not sold in the same tax year, regardless of whether the stock can immediately be sold.

Many AMT adjustments apply to businesses. The adjustments tend to have the effect of deferring certain deductions or recognizing income sooner. These adjustments include:

- Depreciation deductions must be computed using the straight line method and longer lives than may be used for regular tax. (See MACRS)
- Deductions for certain "preferences" are limited. These include deductions related to:
  - circulation costs,
  - mining costs,
  - research and experimentation costs,
  - intangible drilling costs, and
  - certain amortization.
- Certain income must be recognized earlier, including:
  - long-term contracts and
  - installment sales.

To the extent AMT exceeds regular Federal income, a future credit may be provided which can offset future regular tax to the extent AMT does not apply in a future year, if AMT is caused by timing adjustment items such as the exercise of ISOs. However, this credit is limited: see further details in the "AMT credit against regular tax" section.

Regular tax used as a basis for computing AMT is found on the following lines of tax return forms: individual Form 1040 Line 44, less foreign tax credit.

Certain other adjustments apply. In addition, a partner or shareholder's share of AMT income and adjustments flow through to the partner or shareholder from the partnership or S corporation.

AMT is reduced by a foreign tax credit, limited based on AMT income rather than regular taxable income. Certain specified business tax credits are allowed.

== History ==
A predecessor "minimum tax" was enacted by the Tax Reform Act of 1969 and went into effect in 1970. Treasury Secretary Joseph Barr prompted the enactment action with an announcement that 155 high-income households had not paid a dime of federal income taxes. The households had taken advantage of so many tax benefits and deductions that they had reduced their tax liabilities to zero. Congress responded by creating an add-on tax on high-income households, equal to 10% of the sum of tax preferences in excess of $30,000 plus the taxpayer's regular tax liability.

The explanation of the 1969 Act prepared by Congress's Staff of the Joint Committee on Internal Revenue Taxation described the reason for the AMT as follows:

The prior treatment imposed no limit on the amount of income which an individual or corporation could exclude from tax as the result of various tax preferences. As a result, there were large variations in the tax burdens placed on individuals or corporations with similar economic incomes, depending upon the size of their preference income. In general, those individual or corporate taxpayers who received the bulk of their income from personal services or manufacturing were taxed at relatively higher tax rates than others. On the other hand, individuals or corporations which received the bulk of their income from such sources as capital gains or were in a position to benefit from net lease arrangements, from accelerated depreciation on real estate, from percentage depletion, or from other tax-preferred activities tended to pay relatively low rates of tax. In fact, many individuals with high incomes who could benefit from these provisions paid lower effective rates of tax than many individuals with modest incomes. In extreme cases, individuals enjoyed large economic incomes without paying any tax at all. This was true for example in the case of 154 returns in 1966 with adjusted gross incomes of $200,000 a year (apart from those with income exclusions which do not show on the returns filed). Similarly, a number of large corporations paid either no tax at all or taxes which represented very low effective rates.

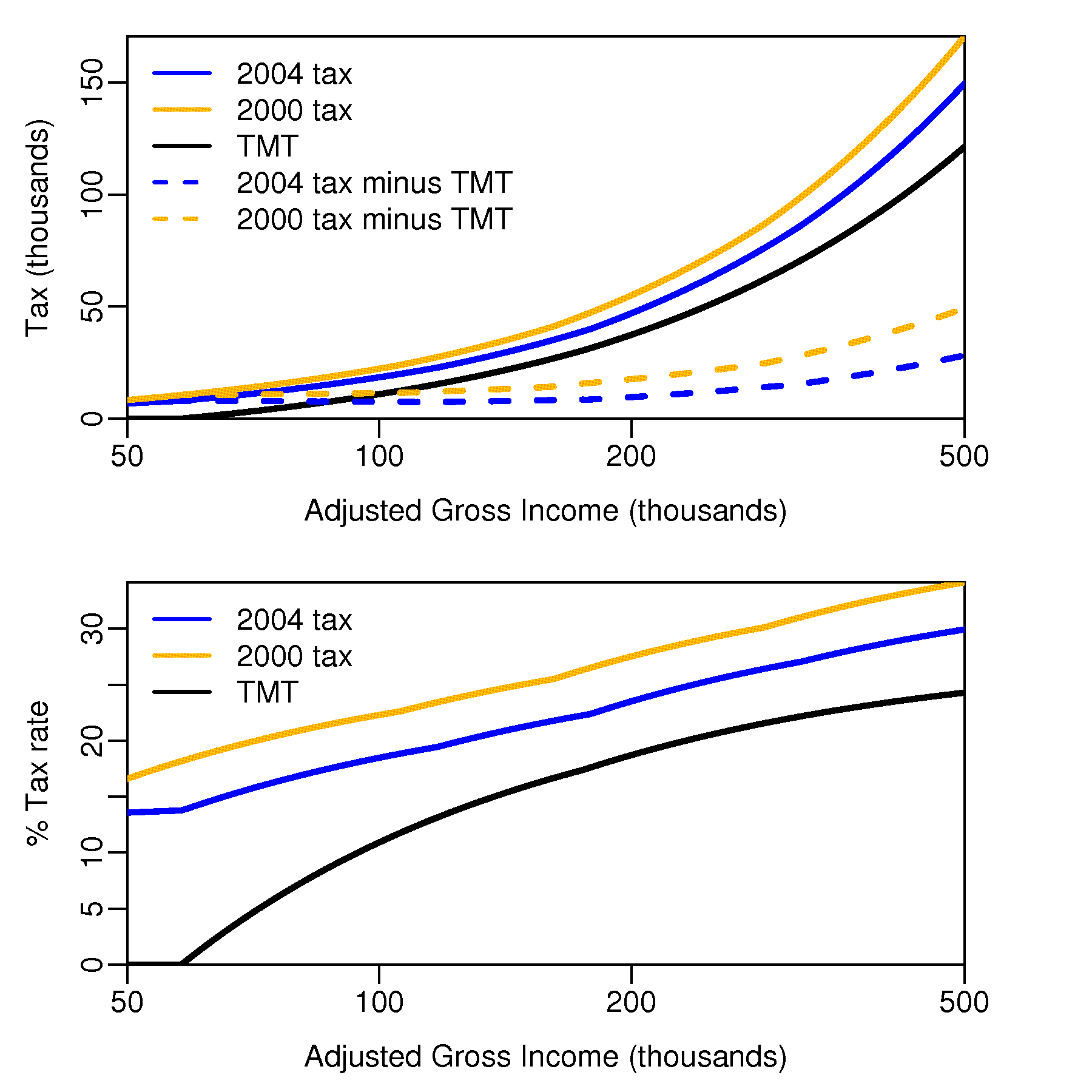
(Top) Comparison of the regular tax on wages only (not taking into account any deductions) in 2000 and 2004 (orange and blue lines respectively) with the tentative minimum tax (AMT before deducting regular tax) (same brown line for both 2000 and 2004) for a married couple who are filing jointly. Two dashed lines show the margins between the tentative minimum tax and the regular tax rates in 2000 and 2004—and how this margin was becoming narrower from year to year. This means that not many deductions are needed before the AMT must be paid. And one needs to claim fewer deductions in subsequent years in order for the parity to be reached, and thus to get into the AMT territory. (The tentative minimum tax is the minimum amount of tax a person will end up paying. If it is less than the usual tax then there is no AMT.) (Bottom) The same narrowing gap between regular tax and tentative minimum tax is shown in terms of effective tax rates paid on various amounts of AGI in 2000 and 2004.

The AMT has undergone several changes since 1969. The most significant of those, according to the Joint Committee on Taxation, occurred under the Reagan era Tax Equity and Fiscal Responsibility Act of 1982. The law changed the AMT from an add-on tax to its current form: a parallel tax system. The current structure of the AMT reflects changes that were made by the 1982 law. However, participation and revenues from the AMT temporarily plummeted after the 1986 changes. Congress made other notable, but less significant, changes to the law in 1978, 1982, and 1986.

Further significant changes occurred as a result of the Omnibus Budget Reconciliation Acts of 1990 and 1993, which raised the AMT rate to 24% from the prior level of 21% and then to 26% and 28% for individual filers with incomes that exceeded $175,000. Now, some taxpayers who do not have very high incomes or participate in numerous special tax benefits and/or activities will pay the AMT.

=== "Patches" to tax rates and exemptions ===
For years since then, Congress had passed one-year "patches" aimed at minimizing the impact of the tax. While not automatically indexed for inflation until a change in the law in early 2013, the exemption had been increased by Congress many times. In addition, the tax rate was increased for individuals effective 1991 and 1993, and the tax was limited for capital gains and qualifying dividends in 2003.

For the 2007 tax year, the patch was passed on December 20, 2007, but only after the IRS had already designed its forms for 2007. The IRS had to reprogram its forms to accommodate the law change.

The tax rate and exemption increases are reflected in the following table:

Recent history of individual taxpayer AMT rates and exemptions
Year	AMT tax rate	Exemption for married filing jointly	Exemption phaseout begins	Exemption for single or head of household	Exemption phaseout begins
2017	26%/28%	84,500	160,900	54,300	120,700
2018	26%/28%	109,400	1,000,000	70,300	500,000
2019	26%/28%	111,700	1,020,600	71,700	510,300

Individual taxpayer AMT rates and exemptions
Year	AMT tax rate	Exemption for married filing jointly	Exemption for single or head of household
1986–1990	21%	40,000	30,000
1991–1992	24%	40,000	30,000
1993–2000	26%/28%	45,000	33,750
2001–2002	26%/28%	49,000	35,750
2003–2005	26%/28%	58,000	40,250
2006	26%/28%	62,550	42,500
2007	26%/28%	66,250	44,350
2008	26%/28%	69,950	46,200
2009	26%/28%	70,950	46,700
2010	26%/28%	72,450	47,450
2011	26%/28%	74,450	48,450
2012	26%/28%	78,750	50,600
2013	26%/28%	80,800	51,900
2014	26%/28%	82,100	52,800
2015	26%/28%	83,400	53,600
2016	26%/28%	83,800	53,900
2017	26%/28%	84,500	54,300
2018	26%/28%	109,400	70,300

From 1986 to 2017, the tax rate for corporations remained at 20%, and the exemption amount has remained at $40,000. In 2018, the corporate AMT was permanently repealed. Before tax year 2018, corporations with average annual gross receipts of $7,500,000 or less for the prior three years are exempt from AMT, but only so long as they continue to meet this test. Further, a corporations were exempt from AMT during its first year as a corporation. Affiliated corporations were treated as if they were a single corporation for all three exemptions ($40,000, $7.5 million, and first year). Previously, corporations filed Form 4626 for AMT. Corporations were also subject to an adjustment (up or down) for adjusted current earnings.

The American Taxpayer Relief Act of 2012 set the 2012 exemption amounts to $78,750 for Married Filing Jointly and $50,600 for Single, and made future exemption amounts indexed for inflation.

== AMT details ==
Alternative minimum tax (AMT) is imposed on an alternative, more comprehensive measure of income than regular federal income tax. Conceptually, it is imposed instead of, rather than in addition to, regular tax.

AMT is imposed if the tentative minimum tax exceeds the regular tax. Tentative minimum tax is the AMT rate of tax times alternative minimum taxable income (AMTI) less the AMT foreign tax credit. Regular tax is the regular income tax reduced only by the foreign and possessions tax credits. In any year in which regular tax exceeds tentative minimum tax, a credit (AMT Credit) is allowed against regular tax to the extent the taxpayer has paid AMT in any prior year. This credit may not reduce regular tax below the tentative minimum tax.

Alternative minimum taxable income is regular taxable income, plus or minus certain adjustments, plus tax preference items, less the allowable exemption (as phased out).

=== Taxpayers and rates ===
Individuals, estates, and trusts are subject to AMT. Partnerships and S corporations are generally not subject to income or AMT taxes, but, instead, pass-through the income and items related to computing AMT to their partners and shareholders. Foreign persons are subject to AMT only on their income effectively connected with a U.S. trade or business.

The rate of AMT varies by type of taxpayer. Through 2018, individuals, estates, and trusts are subject to the same rate of tax on long-term capital gains for regular tax and AMT.

=== Exemptions ===
The deduction for personal exemptions is not allowed. Instead, all taxpayers are granted an exemption that is phased out at higher income levels. See above for amounts of this exemption and phase-out points. Due to the phase-out of exemptions, the actual marginal tax rate (1.25*26% = 32.5%) is higher for the income above the phase-out point. The married-filing-separately (MFS) phase-out does not stop when the exemption reaches zero, either in 2009 or 2010. This is because the MFS exemption is half of the joint exemption, but the phase-out is the full amount, so for MFS filers the phase-out amount can be up to twice the exemption amount, resulting in a 'negative exemption'.

For example, using 2009 figures, a filer with $358,800 of income not only gets zero exemption, but is also taxed on an additional $35,475 that was never actually earned (see "Line 29 — Alternative Minimum Taxable Income" in 2009 Instructions for Form 6251 or "Line 28 — Alternative Minimum Taxable Income" in 2010 Instructions for Form 6251). This prevents a married couple with dissimilar incomes from benefiting by filing separate returns so that the lower earner gets the benefit of some exemption amount that would be phased out if they filed jointly. When filing separately, each spouse in effect not only has their own exemption phased out, but is also taxed on a second exemption too, on the presumption that the other spouse could be claiming that on their own separate MFS return.

=== Depreciation and other adjustments ===
All taxpayers claiming deductions for depreciation must adjust those deductions in computing AMT income to the amount of deduction allowed for AMT. For AMT purposes, depreciation is computed on most assets under the straight line method using the class life of the asset. When a taxpayer is required to recognize gain or loss on disposal of a depreciable asset (or pollution control facility), the gain or loss must be adjusted to reflect the AMT depreciation amount rather than regular depreciation amounts. This adjustment also applies to additional amounts deducted in the year of acquisition of the assets. For more details on these calculations, see MACRS.

In addition, before 2018 corporate taxpayers may be required to make adjustments to depreciation deductions in computing the adjusted current earnings (ACE) adjustment. Such adjustments only apply to assets acquired before 1989.

Adjustments are also required for the following:

- Long-term contracts: taxpayers must use the percentage of completion method for AMT.
- Mine exploration and development costs must be capitalized and amortized over 10 years, rather than expensed.
- Certain accelerated deductions related to pollution controls facilities are not allowed.
- The credit allowed for alcohol and biodiesel fuels is included in income.

=== Adjustments for individuals ===
Individuals are not allowed certain deductions in computing AMT that are allowed for regular tax. No deduction is allowed for personal exemptions or for the standard deduction. The phase-out of itemized deductions does not apply. No deduction is allowed for state, local, or foreign income or property taxes. A recovery of such taxes is excluded from AMTI. No deduction is allowed for most miscellaneous itemized deductions.

Medical expenses are deductible for AMT only to the extent they exceed 10% of adjusted gross income (this is not unique to AMT, it applies to regular income tax as well).

Interest expense deductions for individuals may be adjusted. Generally, interest paid on debt used to acquire, construct, or improve the individual's principal or second residence is unaffected. This includes interest resulting from refinancing such debt. In addition, investment interest expense is deductible for AMT only to the extent of adjusted net investment income. Other non-business interest is generally not deductible for AMT.

An adjustment is also made for qualified incentive stock options and stock received under employee stock purchase plans. In both cases, the employee must recognize income for AMT purposes on the bargain or compensation element, the employer is granted a deduction for this, and the employee has basis in the shares received.

Circulation and research expenses must be capitalized and amortized.

=== Adjusted current earnings for corporations ===
Before 2018, corporations were required to make an adjustment based on adjusted current earnings (ACE). The adjustment increases or decreases AMTI for 75% of the difference between ACE and AMTI. ACE is AMTI further adjusted for certain items. These include further depreciation adjustments for most assets, adjustments to more closely reflect earnings and profits, cost rather than percentage depletion, LIFO, charitable contributions and certain other items.

=== Losses ===
The deduction for net operating losses is adjusted to be based on losses for AMTI.

Farm losses are limited for AMT purposes. Passive activity losses are recomputed for AMT purposes based on income and deductions as recomputed for AMT. Certain adjustments apply with respect to farm and passive activity loss rules for insolvent taxpayers.

=== Tax preferences ===
All taxpayers must add back tax preference deductions in computing AMTI. Tax preferences include the following amounts of deduction:

- percentage depletion in excess of basis,
- the deduction for intangible drilling costs in excess of the amount that would have been allowed if the costs were capitalized and amortized, with adjustments,
- otherwise tax exempt interest on bonds used to finance certain private activities, including mutual fund dividends from such interest,
- certain depreciation on pre-1987 assets,
- 7% of excluded gain on certain small business stock.

Taxpayers may elect an optional 10-year write-off of certain tax preference items in lieu of the preference add-back.

Note that in prior years there were certain other tax preference items relating to provisions now repealed.

=== Credits ===
Credits are allowed against AMT for foreign taxes and certain specified business credits.

The AMT foreign tax credit limitation is redetermined based on AMTI rather than regular taxable income. Thus, all adjustments and tax preference items above must be applied in computing the AMT foreign tax credit limitation.

=== AMT credit against regular tax ===
After a taxpayer has paid AMT, a credit is allowed against regular tax in future years for the amount of AMT. The credit for individuals is generally limited to the amount of AMT generated by deferral items (e.g. exercise of incentive stock options), as opposed to exclusion items (e.g. state and local taxes). This credit is limited so that regular tax is not reduced below AMT for the year. Taxpayers may use a simplified method under which the AMT foreign tax credit limit is computed proportionately to the regular tax foreign tax credit limit. IRS Form 8801 is used to claim this credit.

=== Stock options ===
The alternative minimum tax may apply to individuals exercising stock options. Under AMT rules, for incentive stock options at the time of exercise, the "bargain element" or "spread price" (the difference between the strike price and fair market value) is treated as an AMT adjustment, and therefore needs to be added to the AMT calculation even though no ordinary income tax is due at the time of exercise. In contrast, under the regular tax rules capital gains taxes are not paid until the actual shares of stock are sold. For example, if someone exercised a 10,000 share Nortel stock option at $7 when the stock price was at $87, the bargain element was $80 per share or $800,000. Without selling the stock, the stock price dropped to $7. Although the real gain is $0, the $800,000 bargain element still becomes an AMT adjustment, and the taxpayer owes around $200,000 in AMT.

The AMT was designed to prevent people from using loopholes in the tax law to avoid tax. However, the inclusion of unrealized gain on incentive stock options imposes difficulties for people who cannot come up with cash to pay tax on gains that they have not realized yet. As a result, Congress has taken action to modify the AMT regarding incentive stock options. In 2000 and 2001, people exercised incentive stock options and held onto the shares, hoping to pay long-term capital gains taxes instead of short-term capital gains taxes. Many of these people were forced to pay the AMT on this income, and by the end of the year, the stock was no longer worth the amount of alternative minimum tax owed, forcing some individuals into bankruptcy. In the Nortel example given above, the individual would receive a credit for the AMT paid when the individual did eventually sell the Nortel shares. However, given the way AMT carryover amounts are recalculated each year, the eventual credit received is in many cases less than originally paid.

==== Stock options in non-public companies ====
In the Nortel example above, the taxpayer could have avoided problems by selling sufficient stock to cover the AMT liability immediately upon exercising the stock options. However, AMT also applies to stock options in pre-IPO or privately held companies: in such cases the IRS calculates the "fair market value" of the stock on the basis of information supplied by the company, and therefore may treat the stock as having significant value even though the employee may be unable to sell it (either because there is no market, or because of contractual restrictions such as lock-up periods). In such a case, it may be effectively impossible for the employee to exercise the option unless he or she has enough cash with which to pay the AMT.

== Growth of the AMT ==
Although the AMT was originally enacted to target 155 high-income households, it grew to affect 5.2 million taxpayers each year by 2017, raising $36.2 billion, or 2.4% of federal income tax revenue. The passage of the TCJA for tax year 2018, reduced the affected number to about 0.1% of all taxpayers. This number is expected to rise again in 2026 with the expiry of the individual provisions of the TCJA.

In 1997, for example, 605,000 taxpayers paid the AMT; by 2008, the number of affected taxpayers jumped to 3.9 million, or about 4% of individual taxpayers, raising $26 billion of $1,031 of federal income tax revenue. A total of 27% of households that paid the AMT in 2008 had adjusted gross income of $200,000 or less.

The primary reason for AMT growth from 1978 to 2013 is that the AMT exemption, unlike regular income tax items, was not indexed to inflation before 2013. This means that income thresholds did not keep pace with the cost of living. As a result, the tax has affected an increasing number of households each year, as workers' incomes adjusted to inflation and surpassed AMT eligibility levels. While not indexed for inflation, Congress often passed short-term increases in exemption amounts. The Tax Policy Center (a research group) estimated that if the AMT had been indexed to inflation in 1985, and if the Bush tax cuts had not gone into effect, only 300,000 taxpayers—instead of their projected 27 million—would be subject to the tax in 2010. President Barack Obama included indexing the AMT to inflation in his FY2011 budget proposal, which did not pass.

The 2001–2006 Bush tax cuts also exacerbated the effects of AMT by reducing marginal tax rates (for instance, the top rate from 39.6% to 35%) without making corresponding changes to AMT rates. Economists often refer to this as the "take-back effect" of the Bush tax cuts.

As the AMT expanded from 1978 to 2017, the inequalities created by the structure of the tax have become more apparent. Taxpayers are not allowed to deduct state and local taxes in calculating their AMT liability; as a result, taxpayers who live in states with high income tax rates are up to 7 times more likely to pay the AMT than those who live in states with lower income tax rates. Similarly, taxpayers are not allowed to deduct personal exemptions in calculating their AMT liability, resulting in large families being more likely to pay the AMT than smaller families. With the passage of the TCJA which eliminated personal exemptions in favor of an expanded standard deduction, this was no longer an issue.

== Opinions about AMT ==
In recent years, the AMT has been under increased attention.

The AMT rate has not been changed at the same time as regular income tax rates. The tax cut passed in 2001 lowered regular tax rates, but did not lower AMT rates. As a result, certain people are affected by the AMT who were not the intended targets of the laws. People with large deductions, particularly those resident in states or cities with high income tax rates, or those with nonqualifying mortgage interest deductions, are most affected. The AMT also has the potential to tax families with large numbers of dependents (usually children), although in recent years, Congress has acted to keep deductions for dependents, especially children, from triggering the AMT.

Because the AMT was not indexed to inflation until 2013, and because of recent tax cuts, an increasing number of middle-income taxpayers have been finding themselves subject to this tax. The lack of indexing produces bracket creep. The recent tax cuts in the regular tax have the effect of causing many taxpayers to pay some AMT, reducing or eliminating the benefit from the reduction in regular rates. (In all such cases, however, the overall tax payable will not increase.)

In 2006, the IRS's National Taxpayer Advocate's report highlighted the AMT as the single most serious problem with the tax code. The Advocate noted that the AMT punishes taxpayers for having children or living in a high-tax state and that the complexity of the AMT leads to most taxpayers who owe AMT not realizing it until preparing their returns or being notified by the IRS. A brief issued by the Congressional Budget Office (CBO) (No. 4, April 15, 2004), concludes:

Over the coming decade, a growing number of taxpayers will become liable for the AMT. In 2010, if nothing is changed, one in five taxpayers will have AMT liability and nearly every married taxpayer with income between $100,000 and $500,000 will owe the alternative tax. Rather than affecting only high-income taxpayers who would otherwise pay no tax, the AMT has extended its reach to many upper-middle-income households. As an increasing number of taxpayers incur the AMT, pressures to reduce or eliminate the tax are likely to grow.

In 2013, the IRS's National Taxpayer Advocate recommended repealing the AMT, arguing that it was burdensome, complex, and did not achieve its intended goal.

However, CBO's rules state that it must use current law in its analysis, and at the time the above text was written, the AMT threshold was set to expire in 2006 and be reset to far lower values. Critics of the AMT argue that various features are flaws, though others defend some of these features:

- The AMT exemption and AMT exemption phase-out threshold are not indexed for inflation so that over time, the real values decline and the fraction of taxpayers subject to the AMT rises. However, on January 1, 2013, the AMT is now adjusted for inflation. This was known as fiscal drag or bracket creep.
- The AMT eliminates state and local tax deductions. (Arguments have been produced for and against deducting such taxes. For example, an argument against a deduction is that if taxes are viewed as a payment for government services, they should not be treated differently from other consumption.)
- The AMT disallows a portion of the foreign tax credit, creating some degree of double taxation for the more than 8 million American citizens living abroad. Some modest income families owe AMT solely because of currency fluctuations.
- Businesses and individuals have to do twice the amount of tax planning when considering whether to sell an asset or start a business. They must first consider whether a particular path of action will increase their regular income tax and then also must calculate if alternative tax will increase.
- Taxes are often owed in the year that an exercise of ISO stock options occurs, even if no stock is sold (which, for private or pre-IPO companies, may be because it is impossible to sell the stock). Although many taxpayers believe that in such a case no actual income exists, the bargain element of the exercise is considered income under the AMT system. In extreme cases, if the stock is private or the value drops, it may be impossible to realize the money the AMT demands.

In 1986, when President Ronald Reagan and both parties on Capitol Hill agreed to a major change in the tax system, the law was subtly changed to aim at a wholly different set of deductions, the ones that everyone gets, like the personal exemption, state and local taxes, the standard deduction, certain expenses like union dues and even some medical costs for the seriously ill. At the same time it removed and revised some of the exotic investment deductions. A law for untaxed rich investors was refocused on families who own their homes in high tax states.

– David Cay Johnston, The New York Times

A further shift, involving many definitional changes and extensive reorganization, occurred with the Tax Reform Act of 1986.

A further criticism is that the AMT does not even affect its intended target. Congress introduced the AMT after it was discovered that 21 millionaires did not pay any US income tax in 1969 as a result of various deductions taken on their income tax return. Since the marginal rate of persons with one million dollars of income is 39.6% and the AMT uses a 26% or 28% rate on all income, it is unlikely that millionaires would get tripped by the AMT as their effective tax rates are already higher. Those that do pay by the AMT are typically people making approximately $200,000–500,000.

Determining whether one is subject to the AMT can be difficult. According to the IRS's taxpayer advocate, determining whether someone owes the AMT can require reading nine pages of instructions, and completing a 16-line worksheet and a 55-line form.

=== Complexity ===
The AMT is a tax of roughly 28% on adjusted gross income over $186,300 plus 26% of amounts less than $186,300 minus an exemption depending on filing status after adding back in most deductions. However, taxpayers must also perform all of the paperwork for a regular tax return and then all of the paperwork for Form 6251. Furthermore, affected taxpayers may have to calculate AMT versions of all carryforwards since the AMT carryforwards may be different than regular tax carryforwards. Once a taxpayer qualifies for AMT, he or she may have to calculate AMT versions of carryforward losses and AMT carryforward credits until they are used up in future years. The definitions of taxable income, deductible expenses, and exemptions differ on Form 6251 from those on Form 1040.

The complexity of the AMT paired with the history of last minute annual patches adjusting the law create tax liability uncertainty for taxpayers. For the last ten years, Congress has passed one-year patches to mitigate negative effects, but they are typically passed close to the end of the year. This makes it difficult for taxpayers to determine their tax liability ahead of time. In addition, because the AMT was not indexed for inflation until 2013, the cost of annual patches rises every year.

=== Taxpayer incomes ===
The AMT's former lack of indexation was widely conceded across the political spectrum as a flaw. In 2005, the Urban-Brookings Tax Policy Center and the US Treasury Department estimated that around 15% of households with incomes between $75,000 and $100,000 must pay the AMT, up from only 2–3% in 2000, with the percentage increasing at high incomes. That percentage was set to increase quickly over the coming years if no changes had been made, most notably indexing for inflation. Currently, households with incomes below $75,000 are subject to the AMT only very rarely (and thus most tax advisors do not recommend computing AMT for such households). That was set to change in only a few years, however, if the AMT had remained unindexed.

The median household income in the United States was $44,389 in 2005, and households making over $75,000 per year made up the top quartile of household incomes. Because those are the households generally required to compute the AMT (though only a fraction currently have to pay), some argue that the AMT still hits only the wealthy or the upper middle class. However, some counties, such as Fairfax County, Virginia ($102,460), and some cities, such as San Jose, California ($76,354), have local median incomes that are considerably higher than the national median, and approach or exceed the typical AMT threshold.

The cost-of-living index is generally higher in such areas, which leads to families who are "middle class" in that area having to pay the AMT, while in poorer locales with lower costs of living, only the "locally wealthy" pay the AMT. In other words, many who pay the AMT have incomes that would place them among the wealthy when considering the United States as a whole, but who think of themselves as "middle class" because of the cost of living in their locale.

As early as the first Tax Reform study in 1984, arguments were made for eliminating the deduction for state and local taxes:

The current deduction for State and local taxes in effect provides a Federal subsidy for the public services provided by State and local governments, such as public education, road construction and repair, and sanitary services. When taxpayers acquire similar services by private purchase (for example, when taxpayers pay for water or sewer services), no deduction is allowed for the expenditure. Allowing a deduction for State and local taxes simply permits taxpayers to finance personal consumption expenditures with pre-tax dollars.

Proponents of eliminating the state and local tax deduction lost out in the 1986 Tax Reform, but they won a concession by eliminating these deductions in the AMT computation. That, coupled with the non-indexation of the AMT, created a slow-motion repeal of the deduction for state and local income taxes.

The AMT's partial disallowance of the foreign tax credit disadvantages even low-paid American citizens and green card holders who work abroad or who are otherwise paid in foreign currency. Particularly as the dollar falls around the world, those working abroad see their incomes (when reported to the IRS in terms of US dollars) skyrocket, even if their actual incomes fall from year to year, and even if their foreign tax liabilities increase. They are in effect being taxed solely on changes in exchange rates, from which they do not benefit because their household expenses are all in foreign currency.

=== Avoiding AMT ===
AMT affects very few individual taxpayers (0.1%) as of 2018, and may be avoided by limiting exercising and holding of incentive stock options, and avoiding tax credits or deductions that are allowed under regular tax but not AMT, such as private activity municipal bonds.

For taxpayers who owe AMT, IRA (Individual Retirement Account)/Qualified plan contributions, charitable deductions and home mortgage interest (but not "hard money" refinancing interest) are especially valuable. They reduce tax liability by the full tentative minimum tax effective marginal rate of 32.5% or 35% (for those in the AMT exemption phase-out range) plus the full state income tax marginal rate. This may be quite a bit better than under the regular tax.

=== Arguments against repealing the AMT ===
While many parties agree that the AMT needs to be changed, some argue against its outright repeal.

- A 2007 study by a left-leaning think tank indicated that 90% of the tax would fall on households making more than $100,000 a year, even if AMT were not inflation adjusted through 2010.
- The AMT could be amended so as to have little or no effect on those with lower incomes.
- The reduction in tax revenues from repeal is relatively large. The loss is expected to be between $800 billion and $1.5 trillion in federal revenues over 10 years. According to The Washington Post, "By 2008, it would cost the Treasury considerably less to repeal the ordinary income tax system than the alternative minimum tax, according to the Tax Policy Center, jointly run by the Brookings Institution and Urban Institute." In 2007, an analysis in The New York Times claimed that (1) Annual cost of repealing the AMT, and maintaining the regular income tax, would be $70 billion, while (2) Annual cost of making everyone pay the AMT, and repealing the regular income tax, would be the lesser amount of $63 billion.

=== AMT reform ===
Policy analysts are divided over the best way to address the criticisms of the AMT. Len Burman and Greg Leiserson of The Tax Policy Center, a joint program of the Urban Institute and Brookings Institution, have proposed a revenue-neutral, highly progressive replacement for the AMT. They suggest an "option [that] would repeal the AMT and replace it with an add-on tax of four percent of adjusted gross income above $100,000 for singles and $200,000 for couples. The thresholds would be indexed for inflation after 2007." This plan, the authors contend, would share the original goal of the AMT—that is, to ensure a certain level of taxation for high earners.

Other groups advocate repealing the AMT rather than attempting to reform it. One such group, the Cato Institute, notes that:

- Many tax loopholes the AMT was designed to address have since been closed;
- The AMT is needlessly complex and burdensome to taxpayers;
- A full repeal would leave Federal revenues as a fraction of GDP at about 18%, its average value in recent decades.

The right-leaning National Taxpayers Union also supports repeal. "It is wholly unfair for policymakers to promote certain social and fiscal ideas through exemptions, credits, and deductions, only to take these incentives away when a taxpayer takes advantage of them too well."

The conservative-leaning Tax Foundation says that the AMT could be effectively repealed simply by correcting the deficiencies in the regular tax code. Economist Patrick Fleenor argues that

it is usually the unjustifiable limitations on taxable income...that cause the AMT backstop to kick in. If income were taxed comprehensively by the regular tax code, there would be no way of legally avoiding taxation, and not one taxpayer would have to file the AMT form even if the law were still on the books.

Some have proposed abolishing the regular tax and modifying and indexing the AMT. A proposal to the 2005 President's Advisory Panel on Federal Tax Reform advocated increasing the AMT exemption to $100,000 ($50,000 for singles) and indexing it thereafter, applying a flat 25% rate, and allowing appropriate exemptions for income-producing activities, in addition to repeal of the regular tax.
