= Pay Without Performance =

2004 book by Lucian Bebchuk and Jesse Fried

- Author: Lucian Bebchuk; Jesse Fried
- Language: English
- Publisher: Harvard University Press
- Publication date: November 22, 2004
- Pages: 304
- ISBN: 978-0674016651

Pay Without Performance: The Unfulfilled Promise of Executive Compensation is a 2004 book by professors of law Lucian Bebchuk and Jesse Fried on the power of corporate executives in the United States to influence their own pay and of the structural defects in corporate governance that grant them this power.

The book has been praised by mutual-fund founder John C. Bogle, Nobel Laureate in Economics Joseph Stiglitz, The Washington Post, and others.
