= Jennifer Carpenter (academic) =

American financial economist

Jennifer N. Carpenter (born October 13, 1965) is an American finance academic best known for her pioneering research into executive stock options. Other interests include fund manager compensation, survivorship bias, corporate bonds, and option pricing. She has been published in numerous journals including the Journal of Finance, the Journal of Financial Economics, the Review of Financial Studies, and the Journal of Business.

She is a professor at NYU's School of Business, where she teaches MBA courses in debt instruments and markets, and at the PhD level, continuous time asset pricing and portfolio choice. Before joining NYU, Carpenter worked at Goldman Sachs & Co in the fixed income division, and she was also a lecturer at the University of Pennsylvania.

Carpenter received her BS in economics, MA in finance, MA in mathematics, and PhD in finance from the University of Pennsylvania.

She has presented "The Real Value of China's Stock Market" at various venues including the People's Bank of China, National Bureau of Economic Research, the China Securities Regulatory Commission, the Shenzhen Stock Exchange and the Shanghai Stock Exchange.

== Selected publications ==
- Carpenter, J. (2000). "Does Option Compensation Increase Managerial Risk Appetite". Journal of Business. 55: 2311–2331., Cited 83 times, according to Scopus
- Carpenter, J. (1998). "The Exercise and Valuation of Executive Stock Options". Journal of Financial Economics. 48 (2): 127–158. doi:10.1016/S0304-405X(98)00006-3. S2CID 16674937. Cited 57 times, according to Scopus
- Carpenter, J.; V. Acharya (2002). "Corporate Bond Valuation and Hedging with Stochastic Interest Rates and Endogenous Bankruptcy". Review of Financial Studies: 1355–1383.
- Carpenter, J., M. Carhart, A. Lynch, and D. Musto (2002). "Mutual Fund Survivorship". Review of Financial Studies. 15 (5): 1439–1463. doi:10.1093/rfs/15.5.1439. S2CID 10176712. Archived from the original on July 19, 2020.
- Carpenter, J.; P. Dybvig & H. Farnsworth. "Portfolio Performance and Agency". Review of Financial Studies.
- Carpenter, J.; A. Lynch (1999). "Survivorship Bias and Attrition Effects in Measures of Performance Persistence". Journal of Financial Economics. 54 (3): 337–374. doi:10.1016/S0304-405X(99)00040-9. S2CID 154606576.
- Carpenter, J.; B. Remmers (2001). "Executive Stock Option Exercises and Inside Information". Journal of Business. 74 (4): 513–534. doi:10.1086/322894. S2CID 9951280.
- Carpenter, J.; R. Stanton & N. Wallace (2008). "Estimation of Employee Stock Option Exercise Rates and Firm Cost".
- Carpenter, J.; R. Stanton & N. Wallace (2008). "Optimal Exercise of Executive Stock Options and Implications for Firm Cost".
