= Incentive stock option =

Type of equity grant

Incentive stock options (ISOs), are a type of employee stock option that can be granted only to employees and confer a U.S. tax benefit. ISOs are also sometimes referred to as statutory stock options by the IRS. ISOs have a strike price, which is the price a holder must pay to purchase one share of the stock. ISOs may be issued both by public companies and private companies, with ISOs being common as a form of executive compensation for public companies, and common as a form of equity compensation in private start-up companies.

The tax benefit is that on exercise, the individual does not pay ordinary income tax nor employment taxes on the difference between the exercise price and the strike price of the shares issued (but may owe a substantial alternative minimum tax if the shares are not sold in the same year, especially if the difference between exercise price and strike price is large, on the order of $50,000 or more). Rather, if the shares are held for 1 year from the date of exercise and 2 years from the date of grant (a "qualifying disposition"), then the profit made above the strike price is taxed entirely as a long-term capital gain, at a maximum rate of 23.8% as opposed to 37%.

== History ==
Tax treatment for the incentive stock option was created by the Revenue Act of 1950. In the following decade, stock option grants became popular as a form of compensation, primarily for executives. The introduction of restricted shares and performance shares in the 1960s and 1970s diminished its popularity, but stock options continued to dominate through the 1960s, 1980s, and 1990s.

In October 2004, section 409(a) of the tax code was added by the American Jobs Creation Act of 2004, which set rules requiring the strike price of the option grant to be at least the fair market value, giving rise to the term 409(a) valuation.

In 2005, law professor Erik Lie published a report into the options backdating involving changing the strike price and date of an option after issue, which led to over 100 SEC and DOJ investigations, resulting in 12 criminal sentences.

As of 2014, stock options including ISOs are no longer the most common form of long-term equity incentive rewards for executives, with about half given as performance shares, a quarter as RSUs, and a quarter as stock options.

== Taxation rules ==
If the shares are sold before the required holding period (a "disqualifying disposition") in the same tax year, then the difference between the price at the time of exercise minus the strike price is taxed as ordinary income, and any additional gain on top of the exercise price is taxed as a short-term capital gain. Short-term capital gains are subject to the same tax brackets as ordinary income but are also subject to the 3.8% net investment income tax. If the incentive stock option is sold above the strike price but below the exercise price in the same tax year, the income is recognized solely as ordinary income. Even if a disqualifying disposition is made, if the shares exercised are not sold in the same tax year, the holder must calculate to see if any alternative minimum tax is owed.

Although ISOs have more favorable tax treatment than NSOs (non-qualified stock options or nonstatutory stock options), they require the holder to take on more risk by holding the stock for a longer period of time if the holder is to receive optimal tax treatment. However, even if the holder disposes of the stock within a year, it is possible that there will still be marginal tax deferral value (as compared to NQOs) if the holding period, though less than a year, straddles the ending of the taxpayer's taxable reporting period. Ordinary income from incentive stock options, unlike wage income or income from NSOs, is also not subject to payroll taxes such as FICA.

Note further that an employer generally does not claim a corporate income tax deduction (which would be in an amount equal to the amount of income recognized by the employee) upon the exercise of its employee's ISO, unless the employee does not meet the holding-period requirements and sells early, making a disqualifying disposition. With NQSOs, on the other hand, the employer is always eligible to claim a deduction upon its employee's exercise of the NQSO.

== Elections and considerations ==
=== Extended exercise window and conversion to nonqualified stock options ===
ISOs must be exercised by an employee within 3 months of termination of employment or be forfeited. Since it may be difficult or impossible to sell shares on the secondary market, this would often either force employees to pay a substantial alternative minimum tax liability, or forfeit their earned shares. To solve this issue, some private companies allow the option to convert ISOs to NSOs, which allows the exercise period to be extended to up to 10 years. In March 2015, Pinterest announced that it was allowing employees who had worked with the company for at least two years to convert their ISOs to NSOs and be able to exercise those options for up to 7 years, spurring a wave of companies to follow suit.

=== 83(i) election ===
The Tax Cuts and Jobs Act of 2017 created the 83(i) election for tax year 2018, which allows an employee of a company satisfying certain requirements to defer taxation upon exercise for up to 5 years. The 83(i) election provision and its requirements is very similar to the Empowering Employees through Stock Ownership Act proposed by senators Mark Warner and Dean Heller in 2016.

== Examples of taxation upon exercise and sale ==
=== AMT on exercise and both qualifying and disqualifying dispositions ===
On January 1, 2014, the employee of a private company receives a grant of 1,000 shares at a strike price of $1 vesting monthly over 4 years. Note that the strike price for an employee's ISO grant must be set to the current 409(a) fair market value of the common shares, which is generally lower than that of the preferred valuation of shares owned by venture capitalists that is quoted in news. At this point, the company may contain 9 million shares at a preferred price of $3, valuing the company as a whole at $27 million. At this point, the company can choose to offer the option of early exercise: where an employee can purchase the entire grant before vesting, and perform an 83(b) election and notify the IRS within 30 days with form 83(b). If the employee performs an early exercise and does not fully vest the shares, the exercise price for the unvested shares is returned. In this example, the employee does not early exercise. On January 1, 2018, the company raises another round of funding as the company grows, issuing an additional 1 million shares at a preferred price of $300. The company performs another 409(a) valuation and values the common shares at $200 each. The valuation of the company as a whole is now $3 billion, making it a unicorn.

On February 1, 2018, the employee chooses to exercise or purchase these vested shares. Having fully vested, the employee pays a price of $1 per share to acquire the ISOs. The total cost to exercise the shares is $1,000. With the current common share price at $200 and the strike price at $1, there is a bargain element of $199 per share, totaling $199,000. If the shares are not sold by the end of the year, this $199,000 bargain element, along with the employee's ordinary income, will be subject to the Alternative Minimum Tax (AMT) at a maximum rate of 28%, applicable if it exceeds the ordinary tax rate.

On May 1, 2018, the company raises additional capital in an initial public offering, where the shares are traded on the New York Stock Exchange at $400 per share.

On December 1, 2018, the employee sells 500 of the 1,000 shares at a price of $350 per share. These shares are now a disqualifying disposition because they were sold before a 1 year holding period. This sale generates ordinary income of $175,000.

On December 31, 2018, the remaining 500 exercised but not sold shares creates a bargain element of ($200-1)*500=$99,500 that may be taxed under the alternative minimum tax. For tax year 2018, a single taxpayer earning $100,000 with no special adjustments may incur about $40,000 of AMT preference items such as the bargain element of incentive stock option exercise and hold without paying AMT, due to the AMT exemption.

On February 1, 2019, the employee sells the remaining 500 shares at $300 per share. The employee now owes long term capital gains tax on 500*($300-1)=$149,500. If the taxpayer paid AMT in 2018, the taxpayer is may be entitled to recoup any AMT credit generated in tax year 2019.

== Requirements for classification as ISO ==
Additionally, there are several other restrictions which have to be met (by the employer or employee) in order to qualify the compensatory stock option as an ISO. For a stock option to qualify as ISO and thus receive special tax treatment under Section 421(a) of the Internal Revenue Code (the "Code"), it must meet the requirements of Section 422 of the Code when granted and at all times beginning from the grant until its exercise. The requirements include:

- The option may be granted only to an employee (grants to non-employee directors or independent contractors are not permitted), who must exercise the option while he/she is an employee or no later than three (3) months after termination of employment (unless the option holder is disabled, in which case this three-month period is extended to one year. In case of death the option can be exercised by the legal heirs of the deceased until the expiration date).
- The option must be granted under a written plan document specifying the total number of shares that may be issued and the employees who are eligible to receive the options. The plan must be approved by the stockholders within 12 months before or after plan adoption.
- Each option must be granted under an ISO agreement, which must be written and must list the restrictions placed on exercising the ISO. Each option must set forth an offer to sell the stock at the option price and the period of time during which the option will remain open.
- The option must be granted within 10 years of the earlier of adoption or shareholder approval, and the option must be exercisable only within 10 years of grant.
- The option exercise price must equal or exceed the fair market value of the underlying stock at the time of grant.
- The employee must not, at the time of grant, own stock representing more than 10% of voting power of all stock outstanding, unless the option exercise price is at least 110% of the fair market value and the option expires no later than five (5) years from the time of the grant.
- The ISO agreement must specifically state that ISO cannot be transferred by the option holder other than by will or by the laws of descent and that the option cannot be exercised by anyone other than the option holder.
- The aggregate fair market value (determined as of the grant date) of stock bought by exercising ISOs that are exercisable for the first time cannot exceed $100,000 in a calendar year. To the extent it does, Code section 422(d) provides that such options are treated as non-qualified stock options.

== See also ==
- Employee compensation in the United States
- Non-qualified stock option (NQSO or NSO)
