= Golden handshake =

Contract clause for a severance package

A golden handshake is a clause in an executive employment contract that provides the executive with a significant severance package in the case that the executive loses their job through firing, restructuring, or even scheduled retirement. This can be in the form of cash, equity, and other benefits, and is often accompanied by an accelerated vesting of stock options. According to Investopedia, a golden handshake is similar to, but more generous than a golden parachute because it not only provides monetary compensation and/or stock options at the termination of employment, but also includes the same severance packages executives would get at retirement.

The term originated in Britain in the mid-1960s. It was coined by the city editor of the Daily Express, Frederick Ellis. It later gained currency in New Zealand in the late 1990s over the controversial departures of various state sector executives.

"Golden handshakes" are typically offered only to high-ranking executives by major corporations and may entail a value measured in millions of dollars. Golden handshakes are given to offset the risk inherent in taking the new job, since high-ranking executives have a high likelihood of being fired and since a company requiring an outsider to come in at such a high level may be in a precarious financial position. Their use has caused some investors concern since they do not specify that the executive has to perform well. In some high-profile instances, executives cashed in their stock options, while under their stewardship their companies lost millions of dollars and thousands of workers were laid off.

== Perverse incentives ==
Golden handshakes may create perverse incentives for top executives to facilitate the sale of the company they are managing by artificially reducing its stock price.

It is fairly easy for a top executive to reduce the price of their company's stock due to information asymmetry. The executive can accelerate accounting of expected expenses, delay accounting of expected revenue, engage in off balance sheet transactions to make the company's profitability appear temporarily poorer, or simply promote and report severely conservative (e.g. pessimistic) estimates of future earnings. Such seemingly adverse earnings news will be likely to (at least temporarily) reduce share price. (This is again due to information asymmetries, since it is more common for top executives to do everything they can to window dress their company's earnings forecasts).

A reduced share price makes a company an easier takeover target. When the company gets bought out (or taken private) - at a dramatically lower price - the takeover artist gains a windfall from the former top executive's actions to surreptitiously reduce share price. This can represent tens of billions of dollars (questionably) transferred from previous shareholders to the takeover artist. The former top executive is then rewarded with a golden handshake for presiding over the firesale that can sometimes be in the hundreds of millions of dollars for one or two years of work. (This is nevertheless an excellent bargain for the takeover artist, who will tend to benefit from developing a reputation of being very generous to parting top executives). This is just one example of some of the principal-agent / perverse incentive issues involved with golden handshakes and golden parachutes.

Similar issues occur when a publicly held asset or non-profit organization undergoes privatization. Top executives often reap tremendous monetary benefits when a government owned or non-profit entity is sold to private hands. Just as in the example above, they can facilitate this process by making the entity appear to be in financial crisis – this reduces the sale price (to the profit of the purchaser), and makes non-profits and governments more likely to sell. Ironically, it can also contribute to a public perception that private entities are more efficiently run, thus again reinforcing the political will to sell off public assets. Again, due to asymmetric information, policy makers and the general public see a government owned firm that was a financial 'disaster' – miraculously turned around by the private sector (and typically resold) within a few years.

== See also ==
- Golden boot
- Golden handcuffs
- Golden parachute
- Voluntary redundancy
