= Financial result =

The financial result is the difference between earnings before interest and taxes and earnings before taxes. It is determined by the earning or the loss which results from financial affairs.

== Interpretation ==
For most industrial companies the financial result is negative, as the interest charged on borrowing generally exceeds income from investments (dividends). If a company records a positive financial Result over several periods, then one has to ask how much capital is invested at which interest rate, and if this capital would not bear a greater yield if it were invested in the company's growth. In case of constant, positive financial results a company also has to deal with increasing demands for special distributions to its shareholders.

== Calculation formula ==
In mathematical terms financial result is defined as follows:

$$\textstyle{\begin{align}\mbox{Financial result } & =  \mbox{ Interest income} \\ & - \mbox{ Interest expense} \\ & \pm \mbox{ Write-downs/write-ups for financial assets} \\ & \pm \mbox{ Write-downs/write-ups for marketable securities} \\ & + \mbox{ Other financial income and expenses}\end{align}}$$

== Advantages ==
The advantages of the use of financial result as a key performance indicator

- The financial result provides information about financing costs.
- Information may be gained about non-consolidated companies.

== Disadvantages ==
The disadvantages of the use of financial result as a Key performance indicator

- Operating components may be included in the financial result (e.g.: the income from financing activities).
- Investment income as a component of the financial result does not provide any information on the risk inherent in this investment.
- The financial result may vary strongly over time.

== Accounting context ==
In financial reporting, the financial result typically forms part of a company's non-operating income and expense section in the income statement. It reflects the net effect of financial income (such as interest income and dividends) and financial expenses (such as interest expense and losses on financial instruments), separate from operating performance.

Under International Financial Reporting Standards (IFRS), interest expense and interest income are generally presented separately from operating profit unless an entity's main business activity involves financing.

Similarly, U.S. GAAP distinguishes operating income from non-operating items such as interest income and interest expense, which together contribute to income before tax.
