= Jesse Fried =

American legal scholar

Jesse M. Fried is an American legal scholar. He is the William Nelson Cromwell Professor of Law at Harvard Law School, where he was also the Dane Professor of Law from 2014 to 2024.

== Biography ==
Jesse Fried was born to a Jewish family. He graduated from Harvard College with a B.A. in economics in 1986 with membership in Phi Beta Kappa. He then received an M.A. in economics from the Harvard Graduate School of Arts and Sciences in 1989 and a J.D., magna cum laude, from Harvard Law School in 1992.

== Legal and academic career ==
After law school, he worked as a tax attorney at the law firm of Sullivan & Worcester in Boston, Massachusetts, from 1993 to 1995.

Fried was the John Olin Fellow in Law, Economics, and Business at Harvard University from 1995 to 1997 and became a professor of law at the UC Berkeley School of Law in 2003. In 2009, he became a professor of law at Harvard Law School and received the law school's appointment as its Dane Professor of Law in 2014. He is an expert in executive compensation, corporate governance, corporate bankruptcy, and venture capital.

== Awards and recognition ==
In 2023, Fried was the 19th most-cited legal scholar in all fields according to the Social Science Research Network.

== Published works ==
- Fried, Jesse M.; Bebchuk, Lucian (2004). Pay Without Performance: The Unfulfilled Promise of Executive Compensation. Harvard University Press. ISBN 978-0674016651.
- Fried, Jesse M. (March 2014). "Insider Trading via the Corporation". University of Pennsylvania Law Review. 162 (4): 801–839. Archived from the original on October 7, 2014.
- Fried, Jesse M. (2021). "Will Nasdaq's Diversity Rules Harm Investors?" (PDF). Harvard Business Law Review. 12 (1): 1–8.
