= Lucian Bebchuk =

Finance law scholar

Lucian Arye Bebchuk (born 1955) is a professor at Harvard Law School focusing on economics and finance.

== Life and career ==
Bebchuk has a B.A. in mathematics and economics from the University of Haifa (1977), an LL.B. from the University of Tel Aviv (1979), an LL.M. and S.J.D. from Harvard Law School (1980 and 1984) and an M.A. and Ph.D. in economics, also from Harvard (1992 and 1993). He was a junior fellow of the Harvard Society of Fellows from 1983 to 1985. He joined the Harvard Law faculty in 1986. Bebchuck is the co-author, with Jesse Fried, of Pay without Performance: The Unfulfilled Promise of Executive Compensation.

== Distinctions ==
Bebchuk was named one of the top 100 most influential players in corporate governance in the US by Directorship magazine. He was elected a fellow of the American Academy of Arts and Sciences in 2000. In 2004, he was awarded a Guggenheim Fellowship.
