= Phantom stock =

Contractual agreement

Phantom stock is a contractual agreement between a corporation and recipients of phantom shares that bestow upon the grantee the right to a cash payment at a designated time or in association with a designated event in the future, which payment is to be in an amount tied to the market value of an equivalent number of shares of the corporation's stock. Thus, the amount of the payout will increase as the stock price rises, and decrease if the stock falls, but without the recipient (grantee) actually receiving any stock. Like other forms of stock-based compensation plans, phantom stock broadly serves to align the interests of recipients and shareholders, incentivize contribution to share value, and encourage the retention or continued participation of contributors. Recipients (grantees) are typically employees, but may also be directors, third-party vendors, or others. Business owners may offer phantom stocks as a way to reward and retain employees, however employees can only own phantom stock during the duration of their employment with the company.

For startups, phantom shares can be used in lieu of stock options to provide prospective contributors to the success of the startup with a simple form of equity participation, since the phantom share grants can be tied to negotiated vesting schedules with the payout being tied to a change of control or liquidity event such as an IPO or acquisition. Both the startup and the recipients benefit from the flexibility of the agreement and the minimal legal and tax filing paperwork involved.

For established companies, phantom shares can be used as a cash bonus plan, although some plans pay out the benefits in the form of shares.

Phantom stock can, but usually does not, pay dividends. When the grant is initially made, there is no tax impact. When the payout is made, however, it is taxed as ordinary income to the grantee and is deductible to the employer. Generally, phantom plans require the grantee to become vested, either through seniority or meeting a performance target.

Phantom stock can be taxable upon vesting, even if not paid out, if the value of the phantom shares is pegged to shares that themselves have value. Use of a "rabbi trust" may solve this problem in some jurisdictions; however, that subjects the payout to significant risk, such as not being protected from the company's creditors in the event of corporate bankruptcy. Another way to avoid incurring a taxable event at the time of vesting is to peg the payout only to the increase in value from the time of the vesting to the time of the payout. Thus, the value of the phantom shares at the time of vesting is zero and not subject to taxation as compensation.

A company can also issue Phantom Stock Options, which create a similar result as non-qualified stock options (NSOs). Typically the Phantom Options are issued at a strike price equivalent to the fair market value of the company, resulting in no tax liability at issuance. As the value of the company grows over time, the value of the Phantom Options grows as well. Like NSOs, there are no tax liabilities upon vesting. Upon exercise, the owner of the Phantom Options receives a cash payout equivalent to the stock share price less the Phantom Option strike price. Like NSOs, the payout is taxed as ordinary income. There is no ability to exercise the Phantom Options and receive stock shares, although there may be a provision to receive Phantom Shares. Like Phantom Shares, Phantom Stock Options do not confer ownership rights, or dilute the share ownership of a company, although they do create liabilities to the company. They are used for constructing future cash payouts to a beneficiary, the value of which is tied to the appreciation of the company. They are considered deferred compensation plans as per section 409a of the tax code.

For accounting purposes, phantom stock is treated as nonqualified deferred compensation. As the amount of the liability changes each year, an entry is made for the amount accrued. A decline in value would reduce the liability. These entries are not contingent on vesting. Phantom stock payouts are taxable to the employee as ordinary income and deductible to the company. However, they are also subject to complex rules governing deferred compensation that, if not properly followed, can lead to penalty taxes.

== See also ==
- Employee stock ownership
- Stock appreciation right
