= Non-qualified stock option =

Type of equity grant

Non-qualified stock options (typically abbreviated NSO or NQSO) are stock options which do not qualify for the special treatment accorded to incentive stock options.

Incentive stock options (ISOs) are only available for employees and other restrictions apply for them. For regular tax purposes, incentive stock options have the advantage that no income is reported when the option is exercised and, if certain requirements are met, the entire gain when the stock is sold is taxed as long-term capital gains.

In contrast, Non-qualified stock options (NSOs) are available to regular employees, individual/external contractors, directors, vendors, and other parties. Non-qualified stock options result in additional taxable income to the recipient at the time that they are exercised, the amount being the difference between the exercise price and the market value on that date. NSOs are also not subject to the $100,000 limit rule per year, unlike ISOs.

Non-qualified stock options are frequently preferred by employers because the issuer is allowed to take a tax deduction equal to the amount the recipient is required to include in his or her income.

If they have deferred vesting, then taxpayers must comply with special rules for all types of deferred compensation Congress enacted in 2004 in the wake of the Enron scandal known as Section 409A of the Internal Revenue Code.

== See also ==
- Employee compensation in the United States
