= Employee stock purchase plan =

Means for employees to purchase stock of their company in the United States

In the United States, an employee stock purchase plan (ESPP) is a means by which employees of a corporation can purchase the corporation's capital stock, or stock in the corporation's parent company, often at a discount up to 15%. Employees contribute to the plan through payroll deductions, which accumulate between the offering date and the purchase date. On the purchase date, the company uses the accumulated funds to purchase shares in the company on behalf of the participating employees. The amount of the discount depends on the specific plan but can be around 15% lower than the market price. ESPPs can also be subject to a vesting schedule, or length of time before the stock is available to the employees, which is typically one or two years of service.

These stocks are not taxed until they are sold. If the holding is tax-qualified, then the employee may get a discount. Depending on when the employee sells the shares, the disposition will be classified as either qualified or not qualified. If the position is sold two years after the offering date and at least one year after the purchase date, the shares will fall under a qualified disposition. If the shares are sold within two years of the offering date or within one year after the purchase date the disposition will not be qualified. The majority of publicly disclosed ESPPs in the United States are tax-qualified plans that follow the rules of Section 423 of the IRC.

ESPPs differs from other types of employee stock ownership, such as employee stock ownership plans (ESOPs) in how the stocks are bought, access to the stocks (either after vesting or upon retirement), taxation for the employees, and how much these plans cost to implement for the company.

In the United States, the participation rate for ESPPs is around 30%. Many employees do not exercise their stock options for various reasons, including lack of cash flow.

In 1975, the Tax Reduction Act granted employers tax benefits on contributions to employee stock purchase plans.

== See also ==
- Employee stock option
