= Restricted stock =

Category of stock

Restricted stock, also known as restricted securities, is stock of a company that is not fully transferable (from the stock-issuing company to the person receiving the stock award) until certain conditions (restrictions) have been met. Upon satisfaction of those conditions, the stock is no longer restricted, and becomes transferable to the person holding the award. Restricted stock is often used as a form of employee compensation, in which case it typically becomes transferable ("vests") upon the satisfaction of certain conditions, such as continued employment for a period of time or the achievement of particular product-development milestones, earnings per share goals or other financial targets. Restricted stock is a popular alternative to stock options, particularly for executives, due to favorable accounting rules and income tax treatment.

Restricted stock units (RSUs) have more recently become popular among venture companies as a hybrid of stock options and restricted stock. RSUs involve a promise by the employer to grant restricted stock at a specified point in the future, with the general intention of delaying the recognition of income to the employee while maintaining the advantageous accounting treatment of restricted stock.

Typical vesting conditions for restricted stock awards in venture capital–backed startups may include the following:

- A period of time before vesting, intended to prevent employees from "walking away" from the venture. There is generally a one-year "cliff" representing the formative stage of the company when the founders' work is most needed, followed by a more gradual vesting over a four-year schedule representing a more incremental growth stage. Founders are sometimes permitted to recognize a portion of the time spent at the company before investment in their vesting schedule, generally from six months to two years.
- "Double trigger" acceleration provision, stating that the restricted stock vests if the company is acquired by a third party and the employment of the grantee is terminated within a certain time frame. This protects employees from losing the unvested portion of their equity share award in case the employees are forced out by new management after a change in control. Another alternative is "single trigger" acceleration under which the change of control itself accelerates the vesting of the stock, but this structure is more risky for investors because following an acquisition of the company, key employees will not have any equity award that provides a financial incentive to remain with the company.
- "Market standoff provision", stating that holders of restricted stock may not sell for a certain period of time (usually 180 days) after an initial public offering. This is intended to stabilize the stock price of the company after the IPO by preventing a large sale of stock on the market by the founders.

== History ==
Executive compensation practices came under increased congressional scrutiny in the United States when abuses at corporations such as Enron became public. The American Jobs Creation Act of 2004, P.L. 108–357, added Sec. 409A, which accelerates income to employees who participate in certain nonqualified deferred compensation plans (including stock option plans). Later in 2004, FASB issued Statement no. 123(R), Share-Based Payment, which requires expense treatment for stock options for annual periods beginning in 2005. (Statement no. 123(R) is now incorporated in FASB Accounting Standards Codification Topic 718, Compensation—Stock Compensation.)

Prior to 2006, stock options were a popular form of employee compensation because it was possible to record the cost of compensation as zero so long as the exercise price was equal to the fair market value of the stock at the time of granting. Under the same accounting standards, awards of restricted stock would result in recognizing compensation cost equal to the fair market value of the restricted stock. However, changes to generally accepted accounting principles (GAAP) which became effective in 2006 led to restricted stock becoming a more popular form of compensation. Microsoft switched from stock options to restricted stock in 2003, and by May 2004 about two-thirds of all companies surveyed by HR consultancy Mercer had reported changing their equity compensation programs to reflect the impact of the new option expensing rules.

The median number of stock options (per company) granted by Fortune 1000 firms declined by 40% between 2003 and 2005, and the median number of restricted stock awards increased by nearly 41% over the same period (“Expensing Rule Drives Stock Awards,” Compliance Week, March 27, 2007). From 2004 through 2010, the number of restricted stock holdings of all reporting executives in the S&P 500 increased by 88%.

== Tax treatment ==
=== United States ===
Under Section 83 of the Internal Revenue Code, the value of property transferred in connection with the performance of services is included in gross income, and is recognized as such on the date on which the property is no longer subject to a substantial risk of forfeiture, or the date on which the property becomes transferable, whichever is earlier. In the case of restricted stock, the former date is generally known as the "vesting date" and is the date when the employee recognizes income for tax purposes (assuming that the restricted stock is not transferable at an earlier date, which is how employers generally structure their restricted stock awards). Employees pay income tax on the value of the restricted stock in the year in which it vests, and then pay capital gains tax on any subsequent appreciation or depreciation in the value of the restricted stock in the year in which it is sold.

A grantee of restricted stock may make an "83(b) election" to recognize the income from the restricted stock grant based on the fair market value of the restricted stock at the time of the grant, rather than at the time of vesting. This is often desirable to minimize income tax liability when the restricted stock is granted at a very low value, but is risky in that the tax paid on the stock award is non-refundable even if the stock does not ultimately vest.

=== Other countries ===
Revenue authorities in the United Kingdom and the Republic of Ireland have issued guidelines on the taxation of restricted stock and RSU awards.

== Valuation ==
Restricted stock is generally incorporated into the equity valuation of a company by counting the restricted stock awards as shares that are issued and outstanding. This approach does not reflect the fact that restricted stock has a lower value than unrestricted stock due to the vesting conditions attached to it, and therefore the market capitalization of a company with restricted stock outstanding may be overstated. However, restricted stock has less of an impact than stock options in this regard, as the number of shares awarded tends to be lower and the discount for illiquidity tends to be smaller.
