= Peak capitalism =

Academic term

Peak capitalism is a term used in recent academic literature to describe a situation in which capitalism can no longer survive. The phrase is based on the concept of peak oil and suggests that a capitalist system in a postmodern world can no longer survive, given that the international system depends entirely upon non-renewable resources to reproduce society.

== See also ==
- Late capitalism
- Post-capitalism
