= Bibliotheca (Apollodorus) =

Compendium of Greek myths and heroic legends

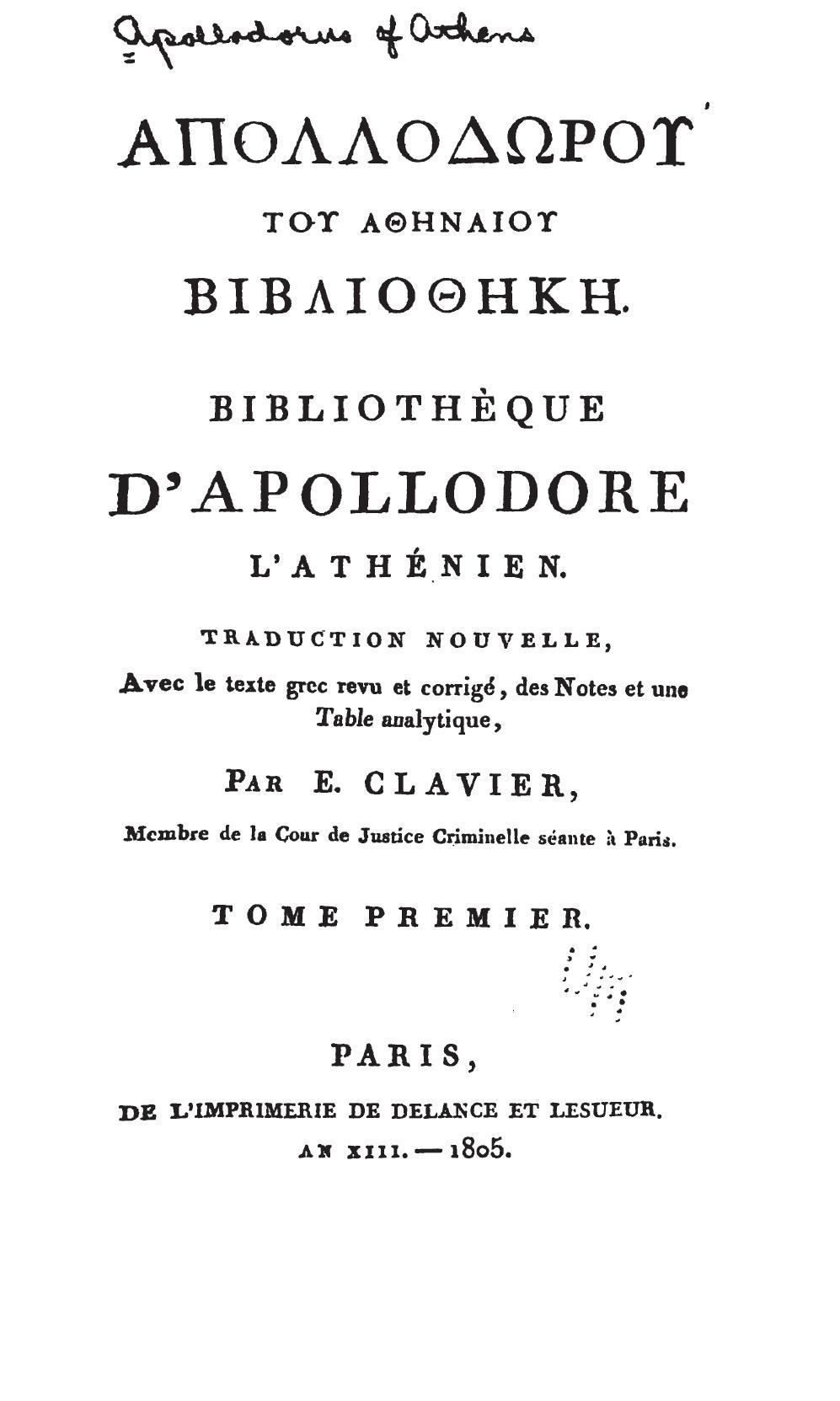
The title page of Étienne Clavier's 1805 edition and French translation of the Bibliotheca

The Bibliotheca (Ancient Greek: Βιβλιοθήκη, romanized: Bibliothēkē, lit. 'Library') is a compendium of Greek myths and heroic legends, genealogical tables and histories arranged in three books, generally dated to the first or second century AD. The work is commonly described as having been written by Apollodorus (or sometimes Pseudo-Apollodorus), a result of its false attribution to the 2nd-century BC scholar Apollodorus of Athens.

== Overview ==
The Bibliotheca of Apollodorus is a comprehensive collection of myths, genealogies and histories that presents a continuous history of Greek mythology from the earliest gods and the origin of the world to the death of Odysseus. The narratives are organized by genealogy, chronology and geography in summaries of myth. The myths are sourced from a wide number of sources like early epic, early Hellenistic poets, and mythographical summaries of tales. Homer and Hesiod are the most frequently named along with other poets. Oral tradition and the plays written by Aeschylus, Sophocles and Euripides also factored into the compilation of myth in the Bibliotheca. The Bibliotheca was written in the first or second century CE by an author who is referred to as Pseudo-Apollodorus to differentiate from Apollodorus of Athens, who did not write the Bibliotheca. Most extant manuscripts of the text end during the narration of Theseus's exploits, with there surviving only two codices, discovered in the 19th century, which transmit the remainder of the work. In the later scholarship it is used as a reference material.

== Authorship ==
A certain "Apollodorus" is indicated as author on some surviving manuscripts, this Apollodorus has been mistakenly identified with Apollodorus of Athens (born c. 180 BCE), a student of Aristarchus of Samothrace who also worked in Alexandria. It is known—from references in the minor scholia on Homer—that Apollodorus of Athens did leave a similar comprehensive repertory on mythology, in the form of a verse chronicle. The mistaken attribution was made by scholars following mention of the name by Photius I of Constantinople, though Photius did not name him as the Athenian and the name was in common use at the time. For chronological reasons, Apollodorus of Athens could not have written the book, the author of the Bibliotheca is at times referred to as the "Pseudo-Apollodorus", to distinguish him from Apollodorus of Athens. Modern works often simply call him "Apollodorus". The work is generally dated to the first or second centuries AD.

== Manuscript tradition ==
The first mention of the work is by Photius, patriarch of Constantinople in 9th century CE, in his "account of books read". The last section of the Bibliotheca, which breaks off during the section on Theseus, is missing in surviving manuscripts. However, Photius had the full work and mentions that the lost section had myths about the heroes of the Trojan War. Byzantine author John Tzetes, who lived in Constantinople in the twelfth century, often cited the Bibliotheca in his writings. The Bibliotheca was almost lost in the 13th century, surviving in one now-incomplete manuscript, which was copied for Cardinal Bessarion in the 15th century. (Note: Bessarion's copy, deposited in the Biblioteca Marciana, Venice, found its way into the Greek manuscripts of Archbishop Laud and came with them to the Bodleian Library in 1636. (Diller 1935:308, 310).) Any surviving manuscripts of the Bibliotheca are descended from a fourteenth-century manuscript in the Bibliothèque nationale de France, in Paris.

== Printed editions ==
The first printed edition of the Bibliotheca of Pseudo-Apollodorus was published in Rome in 1555. Benedetto Egio (Benedictus Aegius) of Spoleto, was the first to divide the text in three books. (Note: He based his division on attributions in the scholia minora on Homer to Apollodorus, in three books. (Diller (1935, pp. 298, 308–9)).) Hieronymus Commelinus published an improved text at Heidelberg, 1559. The first text based on comparative manuscripts was that of Christian Gottlob Heyne, Göttingen, 1782–83. Subsequent editions Jurgen Muller (1841) and Richard Wagner (1894) collated earlier manuscripts. In 1921 Sir James George Frazer published an epitome of the book by conflating two manuscript summaries of the text, which included the lost section.

== Scholarship ==
The Bibliotheca has been referenced in scholarship throughout history. As a mythographical work it has influenced scholarship on Greek mythology. An epigram recorded by the important intellectual Patriarch Photius I of Constantinople expressed its purpose: (Note: Victim of its own suggestions, the epigraph, ironically, does not survive in the manuscripts. For the classic examples of epitomes and encyclopedias substituting in Christian hands for the literature of Classical Antiquity itself, see Isidore of Seville's Etymologiae and Martianus Capella.)

It has the following not ungraceful epigram: "Draw your knowledge of the past from me and read the ancient tales of learned lore. Look neither at the page of Homer, nor of elegy, nor tragic muse, nor epic strain. Seek not the vaunted verse of the cycle; but look in me and you will find in me all that the world contains".

Photius is one of the first surviving reviews of the use of the Bibliotheca in the field. Throughout the 12th and 13th centuries CE, the Bibliotheca was referred to in scholarship about Ancient Greece most often found in letters from scholars of the time. Much of the modern scholarship on the work has focused on the interpretation of its manuscripts by various translators and compilers of the Bibliotheca in later editions. A critical view of past interpretations, compilations, and organization has also been a source of contention. The sources of information that may have informed the creation of the Bibliotheca are also studied in the modern scholarship. The question of authorship is another area of study that has shaped the interpretation of the work throughout history.
