= Étienne Clavier =

18th/19th century French academic and magistrate

- Portrait of Étienne Clavier
- Born: December 26, 1762; Lyon, France
- Died: November 18, 1817; Paris, France
- Occupations: Magistrate, Hellenist, writer
- Known for: Member of the Académie des inscriptions et belles-lettres, judge in the trial of General Moreau

Étienne Clavier (26 December 1762 in Lyon – 18 November 1817 in Paris) was a French Hellenist and magistrate.

The son of a wealthy merchant of Lyon, he made early studies of the Classical languages, followed by studies of law in Paris. In 1788 he purchased a commission as conseiller au Châtelet of which he was soon deprived during the French Revolution. He entered the magistracy under the Directoire, serving as a judge in the criminal tribunal of the Seine, where he made himself prominent by the independence of his character in the trial of General Moreau. Pressured by Joachim Murat, who urged him to pronounce the capital sentence, with the assurance that Napoleon would grant clemency, he made the famous reply, "Et à nous, qui nous la fera?" He was finally discharged from his post in the reorganization of the tribunals of 1811.

In 1809 he was elected member of the Académie des inscriptions et belles-lettres succeeding Charles-Francois Dupuis. He was appointed to the chair in history and ethics at the Collège de France in 1812 and was named censeur royal at the Bourbon Restoration.

Étienne Clavier contributed several memoirs to the Académie des inscriptions. In one on the Oracles of the Ancients, he asserted that the priesthood of Antiquity were under no necessity of fraud in producing their miracles, which were easily explained by the confidence and credulity of the people. As a Hellenist, his work has lost its value, his translations, such as the Bibliotheke attributed to Apollodorus (Paris, 1805), lacking the accuracy demanded by later generations, and his erudition, such as his corrections to Jacques Amyot's translation of Plutarch, ill-directed. His principal merit, according to Pierre Larousse, is to have pursued classical studies during a period that lacked classicists of the first order.
