= Torben Iversen =

Danish political economist

Torben Iversen is a Danish political economist, currently Harold Hitchings Burbank Professor of Political Economy at Harvard University. In 2016, he was named BP Centennial Professor at the London School of Economics.
