= List of International Financial Reporting Standards =

This is a list of the International Financial Reporting Standards (IFRSs) and official interpretations, as set out by the IFRS Foundation. It includes accounting standards either developed or adopted by the International Accounting Standards Board (IASB), the standard-setting body of the IFRS Foundation.

The IFRS include

- The Conceptual Framework for Financial Reporting；
- The International Accounting Standards (IAS) and the International Financial Reporting Standards (IFRS) —developed by the International Accounting Standards Committee (IASC) and adopted by the International Accounting Standards Board (IASB);
- The Interpretations —developed by the International Financial Reporting Interpretations Committee (IFRIC) and the Standing Interpretations Committee (SIC)；
- The IFRS Practice Statements.

The list contains all standards, interpretations and practice statements regardless whether they have been suspended.

== List of the International Accounting Standards (IAS) and the International Financial Reporting Standards (IFRS) ==
N°	Title	Originally issued	Effective	Fully withdrawn	Superseded by
IAS 1	Disclosure of Accounting Policies (1975); Presentation of Financial Statements (1997)	1975	January 1, 1975	January 1, 2027	IFRS 18
IAS 2	Valuation and Presentation of Inventories in the Context of the Historical Cost System (1975) Inventories (1993)	1976	January 1, 1976		
IAS 3	Consolidated Financial Statements	1976	January 1, 1977	January 1, 1990	IAS 27 and IAS 28
IAS 4	Depreciation Accounting	1976	January 1, 1977	July 1, 1999	IAS 36
IAS 5	Information to Be Disclosed in Financial Statements	1976	January 1, 1977	July 1, 1998	IAS 1
IAS 6	Accounting Responses to Changing Prices	1977	January 1, 1978	January 1, 1983	IAS 15
IAS 7	Statement of Changes in Financial Position (1977) Cash Flow Statements (1992); Statement of Cash Flows (2007)	1977	January 1, 1979		
IAS 8	Unusual and Prior Period Items and Changes in Accounting Policies (1978) Net Profit or Loss for the Period, Fundamental Errors and Changes in Accounting Policies (1993); Accounting Policies, Changes in Accounting Estimates and Errors (2003)	1978	January 1, 1979		
IAS 9	Accounting for Research and Development Activities	1978	January 1, 1980	July 1, 1999	IAS 38
IAS 10	Contingencies and Events Occurring After the Balance Sheet Date (1978) Events After the Balance Sheet Date (1999); Events after the Reporting Period (2007)	1978	January 1, 1980		
IAS 11	Accounting for Construction Contracts (1979) Construction Contracts (1993)	1979	January 1, 1980		IFRS 15
IAS 12	Accounting for Taxes on Income (1979) Income Taxes (1996)	1979	January 1, 1981		
IAS 13	Presentation of Current Assets and Current Liabilities	1979	January 1, 1981	July 1, 1998	IAS 1
IAS 14	Reporting Financial Information by Segment (1981) Segment reporting (1997)	1981	January 1, 1983	January 1, 2009	IFRS 8
IAS 15	Information Reflecting the Effects of Changing Prices	1981	January 1, 1983	January 1, 2005	N/A
IAS 16	Accounting for Property, Plant and Equipment (1982) Property, Plant and Equipment (1993)	1982	January 1, 1983		
IAS 17	Accounting for Leases (1982) Leases (1997)	1982	January 1, 1984	January 1, 2019	IFRS 16
IAS 18	Revenue Recognition (1982) Revenue (1993)	1982	January 1, 1984	January 1, 2018	IFRS 15
IAS 19	Accounting for Retirement Benefits in Financial Statements of Employers (1983) Retirement Benefit Costs (1993); Employee Benefits (1998)	1983	January 1, 1985		
IAS 20	Accounting for Government Grants and Disclosure of Government Assistance	1983	January 1, 1984		
IAS 21	Accounting for the Effects of Changes in Foreign Exchange Rates (1983) The Effects of Changes in Foreign Exchange Rates (1993)	1983	January 1, 1985		
IAS 22	Accounting for Business Combinations (1983) Business Combinations (1993)	1983	January 1, 1985	April 1, 2004	IFRS 3
IAS 23	Capitalisation of Borrowing Costs (1984) Borrowing Costs (1993)	1984	January 1, 1986		
IAS 24	Related Party Disclosures	1984	January 1, 1986		
IAS 25	Accounting for Investments	1986	January 1, 1987	January 1, 2001	IAS 39 and IAS 40
IAS 26	Accounting and Reporting by Retirement Benefit Plans	1987	January 1, 1988		
IAS 27	Consolidated Financial Statements and Accounting for Investments in Subsidiaries (1989) Consolidated and Separate Financial Statements (2003); Separate Financial Statements (2011)	1989	January 1, 1990		
IAS 28	Accounting for Investments in Associates (1989) Investments in Associates & ASSOCIATES (2003); Investments in Associates and Joint Ventures (2011)	1989	January 1, 1990		
IAS 29	Financial Reporting in Hyperinflationary Economies	1989	January 1, 1990		
IAS 30	Disclosures in the Financial Statements of Banks and Similar Financial Institutions	1990	January 1, 1991	January 1, 2007	IFRS 7
IAS 31	Financial Reporting of Interests in Joint Ventures (1990) Interests in Joint Ventures (2003)	1990	January 1, 1992	January 1, 2013	IFRS 11 and IFRS 12
IAS 32	Financial Instruments: Disclosure and Presentation (1995) Financial Instruments: Presentation (2005)	1995	January 1, 1996		
IAS 33	Earnings per Share	1997	January 1, 1999		
IAS 34	Interim Financial Reporting	1998	January 1, 1999		
IAS 35	Discontinuing Operations	1998	July 1, 1999	January 1, 2005	IFRS 5
IAS 36	Impairment of Assets	1998	July 1, 1999		
IAS 37	Provisions, Contingent Liabilities and Contingent Assets	1998	July 1, 1999		
IAS 38	Intangible Assets	1998	July 1, 1999		
IAS 39	Financial Instruments: Recognition and Measurement	1998	January 1, 2001	January 1, 2018	IFRS 9
IAS 40	Investment Property	2000	January 1, 2001		
IAS 41	Agriculture	2000	January 1, 2003		
IFRS 1	First-time Adoption of International Financial Reporting Standards	2003	January 1, 2004		
IFRS 2	Share-based Payment	2004	January 1, 2005		
IFRS 3	Business Combinations	2004	April 1, 2004		
IFRS 4	Insurance Contracts	2004	January 1, 2005	January 1, 2023	IFRS 17
IFRS 5	Non-current Assets Held for Sale and Discontinued Operations	2004	January 1, 2005		
IFRS 6	Exploration for and Evaluation of Mineral Resources	2004	January 1, 2006		
IFRS 7	Financial Instruments: Disclosures	2005	January 1, 2007		
IFRS 8	Operating Segments	2006	January 1, 2009		
IFRS 9	Financial Instruments	2009 (updated 2014)	January 1, 2018		
IFRS 10	Consolidated Financial Statements	2011	January 1, 2013		
IFRS 11	Joint Arrangements	2011	January 1, 2013		
IFRS 12	Disclosure of Interests in Other Entities	2011	January 1, 2013		
IFRS 13	Fair Value Measurement	2011	January 1, 2013		
IFRS 14	Regulatory Deferral Accounts	2014	January 1, 2016		
IFRS 15	Revenue from Contracts with Customers	2014	January 1, 2018		
IFRS 16	Leases	2016	January 1, 2019		
IFRS 17	Insurance contracts	2017	January 1, 2023		
IFRS 18	Presentation and Disclosure in Financial Statements	2024	January 1, 2027		
IFRS 19	Subsidiaries without Public Accountability: Disclosures	2024	January 1, 2027		

== List of the Interpretations (IFRIC and SIC) ==
N°	Title	Originally issued	Effective	Fully withdrawn	Superseded by
IFRIC 1	Changes in Existing Decommissioning, Restoration and Similar Liabilities	2004	September 1, 2004		
IFRIC 2	Members’ Shares in Co-operative Entities and Similar Instruments	2004	January 1, 2005		
IFRIC 3	Emission Rights	2004	March 1, 2005	July 1, 2005	N/A
IFRIC 4	Determining whether an Arrangement contains a Lease	2004	January 1, 2006	January 1, 2019	IFRS 16
IFRIC 5	Rights to Interests arising from Decommissioning, Restoration and Environmental Rehabilitation Funds	2004	January 1, 2006		
IFRIC 6	Liabilities arising from Participating in a Specific Market—Waste Electrical and Electronic Equipment	2005	December 1, 2005		
IFRIC 7	Approach under IAS 29 Financial Reporting in Hyperinflationary Economies	2005	March 1, 2006		
IFRIC 8	Scope of IFRS 2	2006	May 1, 2006	January 1, 2010	IFRS 2
IFRIC 9	Reassessment of Embedded Derivatives	2006	June 1, 2006	October 8, 2010	IFRS 9
IFRIC 10	Interim Financial Reporting and Impairment	2006	November 1, 2006		
IFRIC 11	IFRS 2-Group and Treasury Share Transactions	2006	March 1, 2007	January 1, 2010	IFRS 2
IFRIC 12	Service Concession Arrangements	2006	January 1, 2008		
IFRIC 13	Customer Loyalty Programmes	2007	July 1, 2008	January 1, 2018	IFRS 15
IFRIC 14	IAS 19 - The Limit on a Defined Benefit Asset, Minimum Funding Requirements and their Interaction	2007	January 1, 2008		
IFRIC 15	Agreements for the Construction of Real Estate	2008	January 1, 2009	January 1, 2018	IFRS 15
IFRIC 16	Hedges of a Net Investment in a Foreign Operation	2008	October 1, 2008		
IFRIC 17	Distributions of Non-cash Assets	2008	July 1, 2009		
IFRIC 18	Transfers of Assets from Customers	2009	July 1, 2009	January 1, 2018	IFRS 15
IFRIC 19	Extinguishing Financial Liabilities with Equity Instruments	2009	July 1, 2010		
IFRIC 20	Stripping Costs in the Production Phase of a Surface Mine	2011	January 1, 2013		
IFRIC 21	Levies	2013	January 1, 2014		
IFRIC 22	Foreign Currency Transactions and Advance Considerations	2016	January 1, 2018		
IFRIC 23	Uncertainty over Income Tax Treatments	2017	January 1, 2019		
SIC 1	Consistency - Different Cost Formulas for Inventories	1997	January 1, 1999	January 1, 2005	IAS 2
SIC 2	Consistency - Capitalisation of Borrowing Costs	1997	January 1, 1998	January 1, 2005	IAS 8
SIC 3	Elimination of Unrealised Profits and Losses on Transactions with Associates	1997	January 1, 1998	January 1, 2005	IAS 28
SIC 5	Classification of Financial Instruments - Contingent Settlement Provisions	1997	June 1, 1998	January 1, 2005	IAS 32
SIC 6	Costs of Modifying Existing Software	1997	June 1, 1998	January 1, 2005	IAS 16
SIC 7	Introduction of the Euro	1997	June 1, 1998		
SIC 8	First-Time Application of IASs as the Primary Basis of Accounting	1998	August 1, 1998	January 1, 2004	IFRS 1
SIC 9	Business Combinations - Classification either as Acquisitions or Unitings of Interests	1998	August 1, 1998	April 1, 2004	IFRS 3
SIC 10	Government Assistance-No Specific Relation to Operating Activities	1998	August 1, 1998		
SIC 11	Foreign Exchange - Capitalisation of Losses Resulting from Severe Currency Devaluations	1998	August 1, 1998	January 1, 2005	IAS 21
SIC 12	Consolidation-Special Purpose Entities	1998	July 1, 1999	January 1, 2013	IFRS 10
SIC 13	Jointly Controlled Entities-Non-Monetary Contributions by Venturers	1998	January 1, 1999	January 1, 2013	IFRS 10
SIC 14	Property, Plant and Equipment - Compensation for the Impairment or Loss of Items	1998	July 1, 1999	January 1, 2005	IAS 16
SIC 15	Operating Leases-Incentives	1998	January 1, 1999	January 1, 2019	IFRS 16
SIC 16	Share Capital - Reacquired Own Equity Instruments (Treasury Shares)	1998	July 1, 1999	January 1, 2005	IAS 32
SIC 17	Equity - Costs of an Equity Transaction	1999	January 30, 2000	January 1, 2005	IAS 32
SIC 18	Consistency - Alternative Methods	1999	July 1, 2000	January 1, 2005	IAS 8
SIC 19	Reporting Currency - Measurement and Presentation of Financial Statements under IAS 21 and IAS 29	2000	January 1, 2001	January 1, 2005	IAS 21
SIC 20	Equity Accounting Method - Recognition of Losses	1999	July 15, 2000	January 1, 2005	IAS 28
SIC 21	Income Taxes-Recovery of Revalued Non-Depreciable Assets	1999	July 15, 2000	January 1, 2012	IAS 12
SIC 22	Business Combinations - Subsequent Adjustment of Fair Values and Goodwill Initially Reported	1999	July 15, 2000	April 1, 2004	IFRS 3
SIC 23	Property, Plant and Equipment - Major Inspection or Overhaul Costs	1999	July 15, 2000	January 1, 2005	IAS 16
SIC 24	Earnings Per Share - Financial instruments and other contracts that may be settled in shares	2000	December 1, 2000	January 1, 2005	IAS 33
SIC 25	Income Taxes-Changes in the Tax Status of an Entity or its Shareholders	1999	July 15, 2000		
SIC 26	Draft only - not issued: Property, Plant and Equipment – Results of Incidental Operations	N/A	N/A	N/A	IAS 16
SIC 27	Evaluating the Substance of Transactions Involving the Legal Form of a Lease	2000	January 1, 2002	January 1, 2019	IFRS 16
SIC 28	Business Combinations - 'Date of Exchange' and Fair Value of Equity Instruments	2001	December 31, 2001	April 1, 2004	IFRS 3
SIC 29	Disclosure-Service Concession Arrangements	2001	January 1, 2002		
SIC 30	Reporting Currency - Translation from Measurement Currency to Presentation Currency	2001	January 1, 2002	January 1, 2005	IAS 21
SIC 31	Revenue-Barter Transactions Involving Advertising Services	2001	January 1, 2002	January 1, 2018	IFRS 15
SIC 32	Intangible Assets-Web Site Costs	2001	March 25, 2002		
SIC 33	Consolidation and equity method - Potential voting rights and allocation of ownership interests	2001	January 1, 2002	January 1, 2005	IAS 27 and IAS 28

== List of the Practice Statements ==
N°	Title	Originally issued
Practice Statement 1	Management Commentary Practice Statement	2010
Practice Statement 2	Materiality Practice Statement	2017
