= IAS 16 =

International financial reporting standard

International Accounting Standard 16 Property, Plant and Equipment or IAS 16 is an international financial reporting standard adopted by the International Accounting Standards Board (IASB). It concerns accounting for property, plant and equipment (known more generally as fixed assets), including recognition, determination of their carrying amounts, and the depreciation charges and impairment losses to be recognised in relation to them.

IAS 16 was issued in December 1993 by the International Accounting Standards Committee, the predecessor to the IASB. It was reissued in December 2003 and has been amended multiple times, most recently in 30 June 2014.

== Overview ==
IAS 16 applies to property, plant and equipment (PPE). The standard itself defines PPE as "tangible items that are held for use in the production or supply of goods or services, for rental to others, or for administrative purposes; and are expected to be used during more than one [accounting] period."

The standard does not apply to assets classified as held for sale in accordance with IFRS 5 Non-current Assets Held for Sale and Discontinued Operations and assets which require more specialised accounting, such as biological (IAS 41 Agriculture), exploration and evaluation assets (IFRS 6 Exploration for and Evaluation of Mineral Resources), mineral rights and reserves such as oil, natural gas and similar non-regenerative resources.

=== Recognition and measurement ===
IAS 16 prescribes that an item of property, plant and equipment should be recognised (capitalised) as an asset if it is probable that the future economic benefits associated with the asset will flow to the entity and the cost of the asset can be measured reliably. Future economic benefits occur when the risks and rewards of the asset's ownership have passed to the entity.

The standard also discusses the accounting treatment of parts of property, plant and equipment which may require replacement at regular intervals and the capitalisation of inspection costs.

Items of property, plant and equipment should be measured at cost, which includes its original purchase price, any costs necessary to bring the asset to the location and condition for its intended use (e.g. site preparation, delivery and handling, installation, related professional fees for architects and engineers), and the estimated cost of dismantling and removing the asset and restoring the site.

=== Measurement after recognition ===
IAS 16 permits two accounting models for measurement of the asset in periods subsequent to its recognition, namely the cost model and the revaluation model.

- Under the cost model, the carrying amount of the asset is measured at cost less accumulated depreciation and eventual impairment (similar to the inventory's Lower of cost or market prudent principle). Under the cost model, the impairment is always recognised (debited) as expense.
- Under the revaluation model, the asset is carried at its revalued amount, being its fair value at the date of revaluation less subsequent depreciation and impairment, provided that fair value can be determined reliably.
  - If a revaluation results in an increase in value, it should be credited to equity (through other comprehensive income), unless it represents the reversal of a revaluation decrease of the same asset previously recognised as an expense, in which case it should be recognised as income.
  - An asset should also be impaired in accordance with IAS 36 Impairment of Assets if its recoverable amount falls below its carrying amount. Recoverable amount is the higher of an asset's fair value less costs to sell and its value in use (estimate of future cash flows the entity expects to derive from the asset). An impairment cost under the revaluation model is treated as a revaluation decrease (decrease of other comprehensive income) to the extent of previous revaluation surpluses. Any loss that takes the asset below historical depreciated cost is recognised in the income statement.

Depreciation: The depreciable amount (cost less residual value) should be allocated on a systematic basis over the asset's useful life. That is, the mark-down in value of the asset should be recognised as an expense in the income statement every accounting period throughout the asset's useful life. The useful life of the asset is determined by taking into account expected usage, physical wear and tear, technical or commercial obsolescence arising from changes in production or market demand and legal limits on its use. In addition, the depreciation in each accounting period of the asset's useful life should reflect the pattern which the asset's economic benefits are expected to be consumed by the entity.

=== Derecognition ===
Items of property, plant and equipment are derecognised on disposal or when no future economic benefit is expected from its use. An entity should recognise any gain or loss on disposal in its income statement. The gain or loss on disposal is the difference between the proceeds received in exchange for the asset disposed and the carrying amount at the time of disposal.

== Disclosure ==
IAS 16 requires an entity to disclose in its financial statements for each class of property, plant and equipment:

- the basis for measuring carrying amount
- the depreciation method(s) used
- the useful lives or depreciation rates
- the gross carrying amount and accumulated depreciation and impairment losses
- a reconciliation of the carrying amount at the beginning and the end of the period, showing:
  - additions
  - disposals
  - acquisitions through business combinations
  - revaluation increases or decreases
  - impairment losses
  - reversals of impairment losses
  - depreciation
  - net foreign exchange differences on translation
  - other movements
