= IFRS 4 =

IFRS 4 is an International Financial Reporting Standard (IFRS) issued by the International Accounting Standards Board (IASB) providing guidance for the accounting of insurance contracts. The standard was issued in March 2004, and was amended in 2005 to clarify that the standard covers most financial guarantee contracts. Paragraph 35 of IFRS also applies the standard to financial instruments with discretionary participation features.

IFRS 4 was intended to provide limited improvements to accounting for insurance contracts until the IASB completed the second, more comprehensive phase of its insurance accounting project. The replacement standard, IFRS 17 was issued in May 2017 and will become effective on January 1, 2023, supplanting IFRS 4 at that time.

== Provisions ==
Generally, IFRS 4 permitted companies to continue previous accounting practices for insurance contracts, but did enhance the disclosure requirements. IFRS 4 defines an insurance contract as a "contract under which one party (the insurer) accepts significant insurance risk from another party (the policyholder) by agreeing to compensate the policyholder if a specified uncertain future event (the insured event) adversely affects the policyholder." The standard provides definitions to distinguish "insurance risk" from "financial risk." IFRS 4 exempts insurance companies from certain other IFRS standards, including IAS 8 on changes in accounting policies, until phase II is complete, but IFRS 4 does introduce its own requirements for changes in accounting policies.

Among the accounting requirements IFRS 4 introduced are a requirement to test that insurance liabilities are adequate and that reinsurance assets are not impaired. It also prohibits setting up a liability for insurance claims that have not been incurred. Although insurance contracts are subject to the requirements of IFRS 9 that embedded derivatives within other contracts be measured separately at fair value, IFRS 4 makes a limited exception for embedded derivatives that meet the definition of an insurance contract. Such embedded derivatives within insurance contracts do not need to be measured separately.

== Criticism ==
6 of the 14 IASB board members dissented from issuing IFRS 4. Board members James J. Leisenring, Mary E. Barth, Robert P. Garnett, Gilbert Gélard and John T. Smith dissented because they disagreed with the temporary exemption from the accounting policy changes of IAS 8. Leisenring, Barth, Garnett and Smith further objected to the certain practices permitted by IFRS 4 related to the accounting for assets backing insurance companies, including "shadow accounting." Leisenring, Barth and Smith also objected to the inclusion of financial instruments with discretionary participation features within IFRS 4 rather than within the accounting guidance for financial instruments (which at the time was IAS 39), and Smith raised other objections as well, including the exception to separately measure embedded derivatives that meet the definition of insurance. Board member Tatsumi Yamada dissented separately because he did not believe that IFRS 4 appropriately addressed mismatches between the accounting for insurance contracts and the assets backing the insurance contracts.

Leisenring continued to criticize IFRS 4 after its issue, including a statement that "IFRS 4 is a gift of the IASB to the insurance community that keeps on giving."
