= IAS 10 =

International financial reporting standard

International Accounting Standard 10 Events after the Reporting Period or IAS 10 is an international financial reporting standard adopted by the International Accounting Standards Board (IASB). It contains requirements for when events between the end of the reporting period and the date on which the financial statements are authorised for issue should be reflected in the financial statements.

The principal factor for determining if an event is an adjusting event—and hence requiring adjustment in the financial statements—is whether the event provided evidence of conditions existing at the end of the reporting period. Non-adjusting events need also be disclosed where material.

IAS 10 (titled Events After the Balance Sheet Date) was issued in May 1999 by the International Accounting Standards Committee, the predecessor to the IASB. It was reissued by the IASB in December 2003 and retitled Events After the Reporting Period in September 2007 as a consequential amendment resulting from revisions to IAS 1 Presentation of Financial Statements.

== Overview ==
Usually, a period of time elapses between the balance sheet date and the date on which the financial statements are authorised for issue. This is the period during which the preparers are finalising the financial statements.

Events which occur during the period (that is, 'events after the reporting period') can be either adjusting or non-adjusting events.

Adjusting events are those that provide evidence of conditions that existed at the end of the reporting period. Examples include the bankruptcy of a customer that occurs after year end which confirms the non-recoverability of a trade receivable or determination after year end of the cost of assets purchased, or the proceeds from assets sold, before year end.

Non-adjusting events are those that are indicative of conditions that arose after the reporting period. For example, announcing a plan to discontinue an operation after the year end, or the decline in market value of investments after year end. These events do not relate to the condition at the end of the reporting period, but reflects circumstances that have arisen subsequently.

=== Recognition and measurement ===
IAS 10 requires an entity to adjust the amounts recognised in its financial statements to reflect adjusting events after the reporting period. For instance, the settlement after the reporting period of a court case that confirms that the entity had a present obligation at the end of the reporting period. The bankruptcy of a customer who owed a debt to the entity at the balance sheet date usually confirms the loss of the debt. Sale of goods after the reporting period may also give evidence about their net realisable value at the balance sheet date.

An entity shall not adjust the amounts recognised in its financial statements to reflect non-adjusting events after the reporting period. Nonetheless, if the event is material—that is, it could influence the economic decisions made by users of the financial statements—an entity must disclose the nature of the event and an estimate of its financial effect (or state that such an estimate cannot be made). Examples of material non-adjusting events include a major acquisition or disposal of an asset of subsidiary, discontinuing an operation, destruction of a major production plant by fire, announcement or implementation of a major restructuring and commencing major litigation arising solely out of events that occurred after the reporting period.

Dividends declared after the reporting period shall also not be recognised as a liability at the end of the reporting period because no obligation exists at that time.

=== Going concern ===
If an entity's management decides after the reporting period to liquidate the entity or to cease trading, or that it has no alternative but to do so—the entity is no longer a going concern—IAS 16 considers this effect so pervasive that a fundamental change in basis of accounting would be required. In such instances, an entity shall not prepare its financial statements on a going concern basis.
