= Impaired asset =

Asset whose market value is lower than that listed in its owner's balance sheet

In accounting, an impaired asset is an asset which has a market value less than the value listed on its owner's balance sheet.

According to U.S. accounting rules (known as US GAAP), the value of an asset is impaired when the sum of estimated future cash flows from that asset is less than its book value. At this point an impairment loss should be recognized, which is done by taking the difference between the fair market value (FMV) and the book value and recording this amount as the loss. This basically records the asset as if it were being acquired brand new at its FMV, recording this as its new book value. This is a common occurrence for goodwill where a company will purchase a target company for more than the value of its net assets. Under US GAAP, goodwill is tested annually for impairment.

An impairment cost must be included under expenses when the book value of an asset exceeds the recoverable amount. Fixed assets, commonly known as PPE (Property, Plant & Equipment), refers to long-lived assets such as buildings, land, machinery, and equipment; these assets are the most likely to experience impairment, which may be caused by several factors.

== History ==
Asset impairment was first addressed by the International Accounting Standards Board (IASB) in IAS 16, which became effective in 1983. It was replaced by IAS 36, effective July 1999.

In United States GAAP, the Financial Accounting Standards Board (FASB) introduced the concept in 1995 with the release of SFAS 121. SFAS 121 was subsequently replaced by SFAS 144 in August 2001.

The issue of impairment of financial assets exposed deficiencies in the IAS 36 framework during the 2008 financial crisis, and the IASB issued an exposure draft in November 2009 that proposed an impairment model based on expected losses rather than incurred losses for all financial assets recorded at amortised cost. The IASB and FASB made joint efforts to devise a common impairment model, but the FASB eventually decided to propose an alternative scheme in January 2011. The IASB issued a new exposure draft in January 2013, which later led to the adoption of IFRS 9 in July 2014, effective for annual periods beginning on or after January 1, 2018. The FASB is still considering the matter.

== Scope ==
Impairment is discussed in several international accounting standards:

Standard	Title
IAS 2	Inventories
IAS 4	Insurance Contract assets
IAS 5	Non-current assets held for sale
IAS 11	Assets arising from construction contracts
IAS 12	Deferred tax assets
IAS 19	Assets arising from employee benefits
IAS 36	Impairment of assets
IAS 39	Financial assets
IAS 40	Investment property carried at fair value
IAS 41	Agricultural assets carried at fair value

The FASB Accounting Standards Codification addresses impairment in the following sections:

Section	Title
310	Receivables
320	Investments
323	Investments
325	Investments
330	Inventories
340	Other Assets & Deferred Costs
350	Goodwill & Intangibles
360	Plant, Property & Equipment

== IAS 36 framework ==
Impairment is currently governed by IAS 36. The impairment cost is calculated using either the Incurred Loss Model or the Expected Loss Model.

=== Incurred loss model ===
An investment is recognized as impaired when there is no longer reasonable assurance that the future cash flows associated with it will be collected either in their entirety or when due. Entities look for evidence of situations that would indicate impairment. Such triggering events include when the entity:

- is experiencing notable financial difficulties, or
- has defaulted on or is late making interest payments or principal payments, or
- is likely to undergo a major financial reorganization or enter bankruptcy, or
- is in a market that is experiencing significant negative economic change.

If such evidence exists, the next step is to estimate the recoverable amount of investments. The impairment cost would then be calculated as follows:

$$\mbox{Impairment Cost} = {\mbox{Recoverable Amount} - \mbox{Carrying Value}}$$

The carrying value is defined as the value of the asset appearing on the balance sheet. The recoverable amount is the higher of either the asset's future value for the company or the amount it can be sold for, minus any transaction costs.

=== Expected loss model ===
Estimates of future cash flows used to determine the present value of an investment are made on a continuous basis and do not rely on a triggering event to occur. Even though there may be no objective evidence that an impairment loss has been incurred, revised cash flow projections may indicate changes in credit risk. These revised expected cash flows are discounted at the same effective interest rate used when the instrument was first acquired, therefore retaining a cost-based measurement. Calculating the impairment cost is the same as under the Incurred Loss Model.

For example, assume a company has an investment in Company A bonds with a carrying amount of $37,500. If their market value falls to $33,000, an impairment loss of $4,500 is indicated and the impairment cost calculated as follows:

$$\$37500-\$33000 = \$4500$$

This is recorded as a loss of $4,500 in the income statement. Using the 'T' account system, there will be a debit in the Loss on Impairment account and a credit in the Investment account. This will mean the double-entry bookkeeping principle is satisfied.

Debit: Loss on Impairment $4,500

Credit: Investment $4,500

=== Effect on depreciation ===
To calculate depreciation on the asset, the new non-current asset value is considered. Continuing with the previous example and using the Straight line Depreciation method at say, 20%, depreciation would be:

$$\$33000\cdot 0.2=\$6600$$

The depreciation charge is smaller than if the original non-current asset value had been used.

=== Consequential asset value increases ===
Reversal of impairment losses is required for investments in debt instruments, but no reversal is permitted under IFRS for any impairment changes recognized in net income for equity instruments accounted for in OCI; however, subsequent changes in the equity investment's fair value are recognized in OCI.

== See also ==
- Lower of cost or market
