= Impairment =

Impairment may refer to:

- Impairment, or disability, refers to any loss or abnormality of physiological, psychological, or anatomical structure or function, whether permanent or temporary.
- Impairment (financial reporting), a decrease in the net value of an asset when its carrying amount exceeds its recoverable amount.
- A classification of poor water quality for a surface water body under the U.S. Clean Water Act.
