= Fixed asset =

Assets and property that cannot easily be converted into cash

Fixed assets (also known as long-lived assets or property, plant and equipment; PP&E) is a term used in accounting for assets and property that may not easily be converted into cash. They are contrasted with current assets, such as cash, bank accounts, and short-term debts receivable. In most cases, only tangible assets are referred to as fixed.

While IAS 16 (International Accounting Standard) does not define the term fixed asset, it is often colloquially considered a synonym for property, plant and equipment. According to IAS 16.6, property, plant and equipment are tangible items that:

(a) are held for use in the production or supply of goods or services, for rental to others, or for administrative purposes and

(b) are expected to be used during more than one period.

Fixed assets are of two types:

- those which are purchased with legal right of ownership (in the case of property, known as freehold assets), and
- those for which the owner has temporary ownership rights for a stated period of time (in the case of property, known as leasehold assets).

A fixed asset can also be defined as an asset not directly sold to a firm's consumers or end-users.

== Non-current assets ==
In modern financial accounting usage, the term fixed assets can be ambiguous. Instead, the term non-current assets (used by the IFRS and U.S. Generally Accepted Accounting Principles (GAAP) XBRL reporting taxonomies) is preferred when referring to assets that will not be liquidated in the current fiscal period. Specific non-current assets (Property, plant and equipment, Investment property, Goodwill, Intangible assets other than goodwill, etc.) should be referred to by name.

A bakery's current assets include its inventory—such as flour, yeast, and other ingredients—the value of sales owed to the business from credit transactions (accounts receivable), and cash held in the bank. Its non-current assets consist of items like the ovens used for baking, delivery vehicles, and cash registers. While these non-current assets hold value, they are not intended for direct sale to customers and cannot be readily converted into cash.

Non-current (fixed) assets are items of value that the organization has bought and will use for an extended period of time, typically including land and buildings, motor vehicles, furniture, office equipment, computers, fixtures and fittings, and plant and machinery. These often receive a favorable tax treatment (in the form of a depreciation allowance) in contrast to short-term assets.

Note that the cost of a fixed asset is its purchase price including import duties, after subtracting any deductible trade discounts and rebates. It also includes the cost of transporting and installing the asset on-site and an estimate of the cost of dismantling and removal once it is no longer needed due to obsolescence or irreparable breakdown.

== Accounting treatment ==
The primary objective of a business entity is to be profitable and increase the wealth of its owners. To do so, management must exercise due care and diligence by matching the expenses for a given period with the revenues of the same period. The period of use of revenue generating assets is usually more than a year, i.e. long term. To accurately determine the Net Income (profit) for a period, incremental depreciation of the total value of the asset must be charged against the revenue of the same period. Doing so is necessary for determining Net Revenue.

Net book value of an asset is the difference between the historical cost of that asset and its associated depreciation. Under most financial accounting standards (Standard Accounting Statement (SAS) 3 and IAS 16), the value of fixed assets are recorded and reported at net book value. Also, carrying assets at net book value is the most meaningful way to capture asset values for the owners of the business and potential investors.

== Depreciating a fixed asset ==
Depreciation is the expense generated by using an asset. It is the wear and tear and thus diminution in the historical value due to usage. It is also the cost of the asset less any salvage value over its estimated useful life. A fixed asset can be depreciated using the straight line method which is the most common form of depreciation, the units of production method, or the accelerated method. Tax depreciation is commonly calculated differently than depreciation for financial reporting.

=== Straight-line depreciation ===
Straight-line depreciation is the simplest and most often used method. The straight-line depreciation is calculated by dividing the difference between assets pagal sale cost and its expected salvage value by the number of years for its expected useful life. (The salvage value may be zero, or even negative due to costs required to retire it; however, for depreciation purposes salvage value is not generally calculated at below zero.) The company will then charge the same amount to depreciation each year over that period, until the value shown for the asset has reduced from the original cost to the salvage value.

Straight-line method:

$$\mbox{annual depreciation expense} = {\mbox{cost of fixed asset} - \mbox{residual value} \over \mbox{useful life of asset} (years)}$$

=== Units of production depreciation ===
Units of production depreciation is a method where the depreciation expense is calculated based on the actual usage or production output of the asset. This approach allocates the cost of the asset more accurately over its useful life, as it correlates the depreciation expense with the asset's actual usage rather than time. In other words, a business who uses more of the fixed asset would depreciate it more while companies who use less of the asset would depreciate it less. Usage can be measured in production from the asset or mileage from a vehicle. To calculate the units of depreciation method, you need to subtract the salvage value from the capitalized cost which will result in the depreciable cost. Then you estimate the amount of hours used of the asset or the amount of units used in its useful life which will then be divided from the net depreciable cost resulting in depreciation cost per hour or production. Finally you multiply by the depreciation cost per hour or production by the actual amount of time or production which will result in the depreciation expense in the accounting period. For example, if you bought machinery for $100,000 expecting it to make 500,000 units with an estimated $10,000 salvage value, it would result in $0.18 in depreciation per unit as (100,000-10,000)/500,000=0.18. If the machine then produces 50,000 units in one year, you would multiply $0.18 depreciation per unit times 50,000 units equaling $9000 in depreciation expense.

=== Accelerated method ===
The acceleration method is a faster depreciation method in which the asset depreciates faster in the early years of useful life. This method is often used to match the wear and tear in the early years due to machinery being more productive and to defer tax liability to the next years. There are two commons methods double declining method and sum of the years digit method.

==== double declining method ====
The double declining method is calculated by using straight line depreciation rate*book value of each year.

== See also ==
- Bentley Infrastructure 500
- Capital asset
- Depreciation
- DIRTI 5
- Fixed asset turnover
- Fixed assets management
- Fixed assets register
- Like-kind exchange
- Revaluation of fixed assets
