= IFRS 10, 11 and 12 =

IFRS 10, IFRS 11 and IFRS 12 are three International Financial Reporting Standards (IFRS) promulgated by the International Accounting Standards Board (IASB) providing accounting guidance related to consolidation and joint ventures. The standards were issued in 2011 and became effective in 2013. IFRS 10 addresses consolidated financial statements, IFRS 11 addresses joint ventures and IFRS 12 address disclosures of interests in other entities. The standards were developed in part due to the 2008 financial crisis. During the crisis, accounting rules were criticized for permitting certain risky arrangements to be excluded from company balance sheets. IFRS 10 revised the definition of having "control" of another entity, and thus requiring that entity to be consolidated onto the controlling entity's balance sheet. The revised definition is expected to increase the likelihood that an entity is deemed to have control over another. IFRS 11 largely retained previous accounting guidance for joint ventures, but adopted the IFRS 10 definition of "control," meaning that "joint control" would be deemed to exist in some circumstances where it wasn't previously, and vice versa. IFRS 12 requires the disclosures related to subsidiaries, joint ventures and interests in other entities which are not consolidated to be combined into a single disclosure. It also requires disclosures about judgements used to determine whether control exists, why it determined that control did not exist and its relationship with entities it did not consolidate. These extra disclosures were also in response of criticism of the previous accounting guidance after the 2008 financial crisis.

The Financial Accounting Standards Board (FASB), which promulgates accounting standards in the United States, also revised its consolidation rules due to the 2008 financial crisis, although its revised guidance is not identical to IFRS 10, 11 and 12. However, IFRS 11 is very close to the FASB guidance for joint ventures.
