= IAS 11 =

The IAS 11 standard of International Accounting Standards set out requirements for the accounting treatment of the revenue and costs associated with long-term construction contracts. By their nature, construction activities and contracts are long-term projects, often beginning and ending in different accounting periods. Until its replacement with IFRS 15 in January 2018, IAS 11 helped accountants with measuring to what extent costs, revenue and possible profit or loss on the project are incurred in each period.

== History ==
This is a timeline of IAS 11:

December 1977	Exposure Draft E11 Accounting for Construction Contracts
March 1979	IAS 11 Accounting for Construction Contracts
January 1980	Effective date of IAS 11
May 1992	Exposure Draft E42 Construction Contracts
December 1993	IAS 11 (1993) Construction Contracts (revised as part of the 'Comparability of Financial Statements' project)
January 1995	Effective date of IAS 11 (1993)
January 2018	IAS 11 and IAS 18, Revenue, were superseded by IFRS 15, Revenue from Contracts with Customers

== Content ==
How accounting revenue and costs are to be recognized depends first on whether the stage of completion of a project can be reliably measured. If this is the case, cost and revenue (including profit if any) can be recognized up to the percentage of completion during the current accounting period. If the stage of completion of a project cannot be reliably measured, the revenue can only be recognized up to the costs that have been incurred and any profit is only recognized at the end of the last accounting period. In the case a company is expecting to make a loss on the contract, this loss will be immediately recognized in the current accounting period.
