= IFRS 7 =

Accounting standard titled "Financial Instruments: Disclosures"

IFRS 7, titled Financial Instruments: Disclosures, is an International Financial Reporting Standard (IFRS) published by the International Accounting Standards Board (IASB). It requires entities to provide certain disclosures regarding financial instruments in their financial statements. The standard was originally issued in August 2005 and became applicable on 1 January 2007, superseding the earlier standard IAS 30, Disclosures in the Financial Statements of Banks and Similar Financial Institutions, and replacing the disclosure requirements of IAS 32, previously titled Financial Instruments: Disclosure and Presentation.

== Disclosure requirements ==
IFRS 7 requires entities to provide disclosures about:

- The significance of financial instruments for the entity's financial position and performance.
- The carrying amount of each class of financial instrument on the statement of financial position or within the notes.
- Items of income, expense, gains and losses for each class of financial instrument, either in the statement of profit or loss and other comprehensive income or within the notes.
- The nature and extent of risks (credit risk, liquidity risk, market risk) faced by the entity due to the financial instruments. This must cover the entity's exposure to risk, management's objectives and policies for managing those risks, and any changes in the year.
- Accounting policies that the entity adopts regarding financial instruments.
- Qualitative and quantitative information about hedges and hedge accounting.

== Fair value measurement ==
The three-level "fair value hierarchy" is used to measure the fair values of each class of financial instruments with as little involvement of judgement as possible.

Level 1
The preferred inputs to valuation methods are unadjusted quoted prices of identical instruments in active markets. However, such quoted prices are often unavailable and assumptions have to be made in determining the fair values.
Level 2
If the inputs to valuation techniques include directly observable data from less active markets or of instruments that are similar but not the same as the entity's instruments, such a fair value estimate is classified as level 2.
Level 3
These inputs are not based on observable market data from independent sources, and include the entity's own data.

Disclosure of fair value is not required if the carrying amount of a financial instrument is a reasonable approximation of fair value or if the fair value cannot be reliably ascertained.

== See also ==
- IFRS 9, Financial Instruments
- List of International Financial Reporting Standards
