= IFRS 1 =

International Financial Reporting Standard 1: First-time Adoption of International Financial Reporting Standards or IFRS 1 is an international financial reporting standard issued by the International Accounting Standards Board (IASB). It sets out requirements on the preparation and presentation of financial statements and interim financial reports by entities that are adopting the IFRS for the first time, to ensure that they contain high-quality information.

IFRS 1 has been cited by Association of Chartered Certified Accountants (ACCA) as having "great practical significance" in jurisdictions that are adopting the IFRSs. The standard has been endorsed by the European Commission for use in the European Union, with the Commission Services finding in 2009 that the latest version of IFRS 1 has benefits that outweigh the costs of adoption.

== Overview of IFRS 1 ==
IFRS 1 aims to ensure that an entity's first financial statements after adopting IFRS, and interim statements for partial periods under IFRS, will:

- be transparent and comparable;
- provide a "suitable starting point" for the entity's accounting under IFRS; and
- have benefits that exceed the cost of preparation.

=== Scope ===
IFRS 1 applies to an entity's "first IFRS financial statements" and interim financial reports for parts of the period covered by the first IFRS financial statements.

The standard defines an entity's first financial statement as "the first annual financial statements in which the entity adopts IFRSs, by an explicit and unreserved statement in those financial statements of compliance with IFRSs". Specific cases include financial statements of firms whose most recent financial statements were prepared by national requirements not consistent with IFRS or that did not present financial statements in previous periods.

=== Recognition and Measurement ===
In the first financial statement, IFRS 1 requires entities to present an opening IFRS statement of financial position using accounting policies in compliance with each IFRS effective as of the end of its first IFRS reporting period. However, accounting estimates at the date of transition to IFRSs are to be consistent with estimates made by the previously used GAAP.

Any adjustments due to the previous use of a different GAAP are to be recognized directly in retained earnings or another category of equity if appropriate.

=== Presentation and Disclosure ===
IFRS 1 requires entities to explain the effect of the transition to IFRS on their financial position, financial performance, and cash flows. For example, it requires entities to present certain reconciliations between accounting amounts under the previous GAAP and that under IFRS.

An entity is permitted to use the fair value of an item of property, plant and equipment at the date of transition to IFRSs as its deemed cost at that date. If it does so, the entity is required to disclose the aggregate of these fair values and aggregate adjustments from the previous GAAP.

Additionally, interim financial reports covering part of the period of the first IFRS financial statement are also required to include reconciliations from the previous GAAP, among other requirements.

== History and Amendments ==
The project on the first-time adoption of IFRSs was added to IASB's agenda in September 2001, IFRS 1 was issued in June 2003, and a restructured version was issued on November 24, 2008. There have been several amendments to the standard since it was released, including an amendment in December 2010 to guide entities emerging from severe hyperinflation.
