= IAS 23 =

International financial reporting standard

International Accounting Standard 23: Borrowing Costs or IAS 23 is an international financial reporting standard adopted by the International Accounting Standards Board (IASB). Borrowing costs refer to the interest & other costs that an entity incurs in connection with the borrowing of funds. IAS 23 provides guidance on how to measure borrowing costs, particularly when the costs of acquisition, construction or production are funded by an entity’s general borrowings. The standard mandates that borrowing costs that are directly attributable to the acquisition, construction or production of a qualifying asset must be capitalized as part of that asset. Other borrowing costs are recognised as an expense.

IAS 23 was issued in 1984 and came into effect on January 1, 1986.

== Definitions ==
Borrowing costs may include the following:

- interest expense calculated using the effective interest method as described in IFRS 9
- interest in respect of lease liabilities recognised in accordance with IFRS 16 Leases; and
- exchange differences arising from foreign currency borrowings to the extent that they are regarded as an adjustment to interest costs.

Depending on the circumstances, any of the following may be qualifying assets:

- inventories
- manufacturing plants
- power generation facilities
- intangible assets
- investment properties
- bearer plants.

== Recognition ==
An entity shall capitalise borrowing costs that are directly attributable to the acquisition, construction or production of a qualifying asset as part of the cost of that asset. An entity shall recognise other borrowing costs as an expense in the period in which it incurs them. Where funds are borrowed specifically, costs eligible for capitalisation are the actual costs incurred less any income earned on the temporary investment of such borrowings (IAS 23.12). Where funds are part of a general pool, the eligible amount is determined by applying a capitalisation rate to the expenditure on that asset. The capitalisation rate will be the weighted average of the borrowing costs applicable to the general pool (IAS 23.14).

=== Commencement of Capitalization ===
The capitalisation begins when the entity first meets all of the following conditions: (IAS 23.17)

1. It incurs expenditures for the asset;
2. It incurs borrowing costs; and
3. It undertakes activities necessary to prepare asset for its intended use.

=== Suspension of Capitalization ===
An entity shall suspend capitalisation of borrowing costs during extended periods in which it suspends active development of a qualifying asset (IAS 23.20).

=== Cessation of Capitalization ===
An entity shall cease capitalising borrowing costs when substantially all the activities necessary to prepare the qualifying asset for its intended use or sale are complete (IAS 23.22).

== Disclosure Requirements ==
An entity shall disclose:

1. the amount of borrowing costs capitalised during the period; and
2. the capitalisation rate used to determine the amount of borrowing costs eligible for capitalisation.

== See also ==
- List of International Financial Reporting Standards
- International Financial Reporting Standards requirements
