= IAS 2 =

International standard

IAS 2 is an international financial reporting standard produced and disseminated by the International Accounting Standards Board (IASB) to provide guidance on the valuation and classification of inventories.

== Overview ==
IAS 2 defines inventories as assets which are:

- held for sale in the ordinary course of business,
- in the process of production for such sale, or
- in the form of materials or supplies to be consumed in the production or rendering of services.

IAS 2 requires that those assets that are considered inventory should be recorded at the lower of cost or net realisable value. Cost not only includes the purchase cost but also the conversion costs, which are the costs involved in bringing inventory to its present condition and location, such as direct labour. IAS 2 also allows for the capitalisation of variable overheads and fixed overheads so long as the fixed overheads are allocated on a systematic and consistent basis and in respect to usual output levels. Where output is lower than expected the resultant excessive overhead should be considered an expense and not capitalised but when output is abnormally high the fixed overhead allocated to each unit must be decreased so as not to overvalue the inventory.

In the event of there being multiple products produced from one process, such as a main product and a by-product, where the costs are not clearly separated, the costs should be allocated “on a rational and consistent basis”, such as based on the market value of each unit once the two products become separate.

IAS 2 does not allow for the capitalisation of:

- (a) the cost of abnormal levels of waste,
- (b) storage costs where the storage is not part of the production process,
- (c) administrative costs,
- (d) selling costs.

The valuation of work in progress on construction and service contracts falls outside IAS 2 (IFRS 15 applies instead); similarly for financial instruments, IAS 32 and IFRS 9 apply and for biological assets arising from agricultural activity, IAS 41 applies instead of IAS 2. For the capitalisation of borrowing costs in inventories, consult “IAS 23 Borrowing Costs”.

IAS 2 allows for two methods of costing, the standard technique and the retail technique. The standard technique requires that inventory be valued at the standard cost of each unit; that is, the usual cost per unit at the normal level of output and efficiency. The retail technique values the inventory by taking its sales value and then reducing it by the relevant gross profit margin. Where items of inventory are not ordinarily interchangeable or where certain items are earmarked for specific projects, these items are required to have their specific costs identified and assigned to them individually.

IAS 2 also requires the use of the First-in, First-out (FIFO) principle whereby those items which have been in stock the longest are considered to be the items that are being used first, ensuring that those items which are held in inventory at the reporting date are valued at the most recent price. As an alternative, costs of inventories may be assigned by using the weighted average cost formula.

The value of inventories must be recorded at the lower of cost or net realisable value. Where net realisable value drops to below the cost of inventory the loss is to be recognised as an expense in the period in which the drop of value occurs.
