= Book value =

Value of an asset according to its balance sheet account balance

In accounting, book value (or carrying value) is the value of an asset according to its balance sheet account balance. For assets, the value is based on the original cost of the asset less any depreciation, amortization or impairment costs made against the asset. Traditionally, a company's book value is its total assets minus intangible assets and liabilities. However, in practice, depending on the source of the calculation, book value may variably include goodwill, intangible assets, or both. The value inherent in its workforce, part of the intellectual capital of a company, is always ignored. When intangible assets and goodwill are explicitly excluded, the metric is often specified to be tangible book value.

In the United Kingdom, the term net asset value may refer to the book value of a company.

== Asset book value ==
An asset's initial book value is its actual cash value or its acquisition cost. Cash assets are recorded or "booked" at actual cash value. Assets such as buildings, land and equipment are valued based on their acquisition cost, which includes the actual cash cost of the asset plus certain costs tied to the purchase of the asset, such as broker fees. Not all purchased items are recorded as assets; incidental supplies are recorded as expenses. Some assets might be recorded as current expenses for tax purposes. An example of this is assets purchased and expensed under Section 179 of the U.S. tax code.

=== Depreciable, amortizable and depletable assets ===
Monthly or annual depreciation, amortization and depletion are used to reduce the book value of assets over time as they are "consumed" or used up in the process of obtaining revenue. These non-cash expenses are recorded in the accounting books after a trial balance is calculated to ensure that cash transactions have been recorded accurately. Depreciation is used to record the declining value of buildings and equipment over time. Land is not depreciated. Amortization is used to record the declining value of intangible assets such as patents. Depletion is used to record the consumption of natural resources.

Depreciation, amortization and depletion are recorded as expenses against a contra account. Contra accounts are used in bookkeeping to record asset and liability valuation changes. Accumulated depreciation is a contra-asset account used to record asset depreciation.

Sample general journal entry for depreciation

- Depreciation expenses: building... debit = $150, under expenses in retained earnings
- Accumulated depreciation: building... credit = $150, under assets

The balance sheet valuation for an asset is the asset's cost basis minus accumulated depreciation. Similar bookkeeping transactions are used to record amortization and depletion.

"Discount on notes payable" is a contra-liability account which decreases the balance sheet valuation of the liability.

When a company sells (issues) bonds, this debt is a long-term liability on the company's balance sheet, recorded in the account Bonds Payable based on the contract amount. After the bonds are sold, the book value of Bonds Payable is increased or decreased to reflect the actual amount received in payment for the bonds. If the bonds sell for less than face value, the contra account Discount on Bonds Payable is debited for the difference between the amount of cash received and the face value of the bonds.

== Net asset value ==
A mutual fund is an entity which primarily owns financial assets or capital assets such as bonds, stocks and commercial paper. The net asset value of a mutual fund is the market value of assets owned by the fund minus the fund's liabilities. This is similar to shareholders' equity, except the asset valuation is market-based rather than based on acquisition cost. In financial news reporting, the reported net asset value of a mutual fund is the net asset value of a single share in the fund. In the mutual fund's accounting records, the financial assets are recorded at acquisition cost. When assets are sold, the fund records a capital gain or capital loss.

Financial assets include stock shares and bonds owned by an individual or company. These may be reported on the individual or company balance sheet at cost or at market value.

== Corporate book value ==
A company or corporation's book value, as an asset held by a separate economic entity, is the company or corporation's shareholders' equity, the acquisition cost of the shares, or the market value of the shares owned by the separate economic entity.

A corporation's book value is used in fundamental financial analysis to help determine whether the market value of corporate shares is above or below the book value of corporate shares. Neither market value nor book value is an unbiased estimate of a corporation's value. The corporation's bookkeeping or accounting records do not generally reflect the market value of assets and liabilities, and the market or trade value of the corporation's stock is subject to variations.

== Tangible common equity ==
A variation of book value, tangible common equity, has recently come into use by the U.S. federal government in the valuation of troubled banks. Tangible common equity is calculated as total book value minus intangible assets, goodwill, and preferred equity, and can thus be considered the most conservative valuation of a company and the best approximation of its value should it be forced to liquidate.

Since tangible common equity subtracts preferred equity from the tangible book value, it does a better job estimating what the value of the company is to holders of specifically common stock compared to standard calculations of book value.

== Stock pricing book value ==
To clearly distinguish the market price of shares from the core ownership equity or shareholders' equity, the term book value is often used since it focuses on the values that have been added and subtracted in the accounting books of a business (assets – liabilities). The term is also used to distinguish between the market price of any asset and its accounting value which depends more on historical cost and depreciation. It may be used interchangeably with carrying value. While it can be used to refer to the business' total equity, it is most often used:

- As a per share value: The balance sheet equity value is divided by the number of shares outstanding at the date of the balance sheet (not the average o/s in the period).
- As a diluted per share value: The equity is bumped up by the exercise price of the options, warrants or preferred shares. Then it is divided by the number of shares that has been increased by those added.

=== Uses of books ===
1. Book value is used in the financial ratio price/book. It is a valuation metric that sets the floor for stock prices under a worst-case scenario. When a business is liquidated, the book value is what may be left over for the owners after all the debts are paid. Paying only a price/book = 1 means the investor will get all his investment back, assuming assets can be resold at their book value. Shares of capital intensive industries trade at lower price/book ratios because they generate lower earnings per dollar of assets. Business depending on human capital will generate higher earnings per dollar of assets, so will trade at higher price/book ratios.
2. Book value per share can be used to generate a measure of comprehensive earnings, when the opening and closing values are reconciled. BookValuePerShare, beginning of year – Dividends + ShareIssuePremium + Comprehensive EPS = BookValuePerShare, end of year.

=== Changes are caused by ===
1. The sale of shares/units by the business increases the total book value. Book/sh will increase if the additional shares are issued at a price higher than the pre-existing book/sh.
2. The purchase of its own shares by the business will decrease total book value. Book/shares will decrease if more is paid for them than was received when originally issued (pre-existing book/sh).
3. Dividends paid out will decrease book value and book/sh.
4. Comprehensive earnings/losses will increase/decrease book value and book/sh. Comprehensive earnings, in this case, includes net income from the Income Statement, foreign exchange translation changes to Balance Sheet items, accounting changes applied retroactively, and the opportunity cost of options exercised.

=== New share issues and dilution ===
The issue of more shares does not necessarily decrease the value of the current owner. While it is correct that when the number of shares is doubled the EPS will be cut in half, it is too simple to be the full story. It all depends on how much was paid for the new shares and what return the new capital earns once invested. See the discussion at stock dilution.

=== Net book value of long term assets ===
Book value is often used interchangeably with net book value or carrying value, which is the original acquisition cost less accumulated depreciation, depletion or amortization. Book value is the term which means the value of the firm as per the books of the company. It is the value at which the assets are valued in the balance sheet of the company as on the given date.

== See also ==
- Capital formation
- Fixed capital
- List of accounting topics
- Market value
- Equity (finance)
- Stock dilution
- Tangible common equity
