= Convention of disclosure =

The convention of disclosure requires that all material facts must be disclosed in the financial statements. For example, in the case of sundry debtors, not only the total amount of sundry debtors should be disclosed, but also the amount of good and secured debtors, the amount of good but unsecured debtors and amount of doubtful debts should be stated. This does not mean disclosure of each and every item of information. It only means disclosure of such information which is of significance to owners, investors and creditors.

== See also ==
- IFRS 7, Financial Instruments: Disclosures
