= Hedge accounting =

Accounting method aligning hedging gains and losses with the hedged item

Hedge accounting is an accountancy practice, the aim of which is to provide an offset to the mark-to-market movement of the derivative in the profit and loss account.

== Types ==
There are two types of hedge recognized. For a fair value hedge, the offset is achieved either by marking-to-market an asset or a liability which offsets the P&L movement of the derivative. For a "cash flow hedge", variability in the position's cash flows is reduced, and placed into a separate component of the entity's equity called the "cash flow hedge reserve".

Where a hedge relationship is effective (meets the 80%–125% rule), most of the mark-to-market derivative volatility will be offset in the profit and loss account. Hedge accounting entails much compliance - involving documenting the hedge relationship and both prospectively and retrospectively proving that the hedge relationship is effective.

== Necessity ==
All entities are exposed to some form of market risk. For example, gold mines are exposed to the price of gold, airlines to the price of jet fuel, borrowers to interest rates, and importers and exporters to exchange rate risks.

Many financial institutions and corporate businesses (entities) use derivative financial instruments to hedge their exposure to different risks (for example interest rate risk, foreign exchange risk, commodity risk, etc.).

Accounting for derivative financial instruments under International Accounting Standards is covered by IAS39 (Financial Instrument: Recognition and Measurement).

IAS39 requires that all derivatives are marked-to-market with changes in the mark-to-market being taken to the profit and loss account. For many entities this would result in a significant amount of profit and loss volatility arising from the use of derivatives.

An entity can mitigate the profit and loss effect arising from derivatives used for hedging, through an optional part of IAS39 relating to hedge accounting.

== Foreign currency exposure ==
A specific type of hedging transaction that entities can engage in aims to manage foreign currency exposure. These hedges are undertaken for the economic aim of reducing potential loss from fluctuations in foreign exchange rates. However, not all hedges are designated for special accounting treatment. Accounting standards enable hedge accounting for three different designated forex hedges:

- A cash flow hedge may be designated for a highly probable forecasted transaction, a firm commitment (not recorded on the balance sheet), foreign currency cash flows of a recognized asset or liability, or a forecasted intercompany transaction.
- A fair value hedge may be designated for a firm commitment (not recorded) or foreign currency cash flows of a recognized asset or liability.
- A net investment hedge may be designated for the net investment in a foreign operation.

== See also ==
- IFRS 9 Financial Instruments (replacement of IAS 39), of the International Accounting Standards Board
- IAS 39 Financial Instruments: Recognition and Measurement, of the International Accounting Standards Board
- Fair value accounting

== Sources ==
- A summary of the IAS39 by Deloitte Touche Tohmatsu.
