= International Accounting Standards Committee =

International organization

The International Accounting Standards Committee (IASC) was founded in June 1973 in London at the initiative of Sir Henry Benson, former president of the Institute of Chartered Accountants in England and Wales. The IASC was created by national accountancy bodies from a number of countries with a view to harmonizing the international diversity of company reporting practices. Between its founding in 1973 and its dissolution in 2001, it developed a set of International Accounting Standards (IAS) that gradually acquired a degree of acceptance in countries around the world. Although the IASC came to include some organizations representing preparers and users of financial statements, it largely remained an initiative of the accountancy profession. On 1 April 2001, it was replaced by the International Accounting Standards Board (IASB), an independent standard-setting body. The IASB adopted the extant corpus of IAS which it continued to develop as International Financial Reporting Standards.

== Membership ==
The IASC was founded as a result of an agreement between accountancy bodies in the following countries:

- Australia (Institute of Chartered Accountants in Australia (ICAA) and the CPA Australia (formerly known as Australian Society of Certified Practising Accountants (ASCPA))
- Canada (Canadian Institute of Chartered Accountants (CICA))
- France (Ordre des Experts Comptables et des Comptables Agréés (Order of Accounting Experts and Qualified Accountants))
- Germany (Institut der Wirtschaftsprüfer in Deutschland (IDW) (Institute of Auditors in Germany) and the Wirtschaftsprüferkammer (WPK) (Chamber of Auditors))
- Japan Nihon Kouninkaikeishi Kyoukai (Japanese Institute of Certified Public Accountants, JICPA))
- Mexico (Instituto Mexicano de Contadores Públicos (IMCP) (Mexican Institute of Public Accountants)) (removed from the board in 1987 due to non-payment of dues; resumed in 1995).
- the Netherlands (Nederlands Instituut van Registeraccountants (NIVRA) (Netherlands Institute of Registered Auditors))
- the United Kingdom and Ireland (counted as one) (Institute of Chartered Accountants in England and Wales (ICAEW), Institute of Chartered Accountants of Scotland (ICAS), Institute of Chartered Accountants in Ireland (ICAI), Association of Chartered Certified Accountants (ACCA), Chartered Institute of Management Accountants (CIMA), and the Chartered Institute of Public Finance and Accountancy (CIPFA)
- the United States of America (American Institute of Certified Public Accountants (AICPA))

Membership of the committee (later known as the board) was on an institutional, not at an individual basis. Each institution represented on the board could send a delegation of two representatives and a staff observer to committee meetings. Each delegation wielded one vote. According to the IASC's original Constitution, membership was limited to the founding member bodies. Other accountancy bodies could join as associate members. This allowed them to propose members for working parties and so to contribute to the setting of the standards, but did not give them representation or a vote at board meetings. In 1977, the IASC's Constitution was changed to allow for the appointment of two additional board members for four-year terms, on a rotating basis. In a further change to the Constitution in 1982, the terms of all board members were limited to five years. The distinction between founding and associate members was abolished, as all member bodies of the International Federation of Accountants (IFAC) became members of the IASC. Board members were since then appointed by the IFAC Council. Because of an agreement reached in 1981 between IFAC and the IASC, the founding member bodies continued to be reappointed (with the exception of Mexico in 1987) and de facto retained their permanent seats. Under these arrangements, the following changes in board membership took place:

- The National Council of Chartered Accountants (South Africa, subsequently known as the South African Institute of Chartered Accountants, SAICA) became an associate member in 1974 and joined the board in 1978. Because of continued reappointments, South Africa became in effect a permanent member of the board. In 1995 the South Africans began sharing their representation on the board with the Institute of Chartered Accountants of Zimbabwe.
- The Institute of Chartered Accountants of Nigeria became an associate member in 1976 and was a member of the board from 1979 to 1987.
- The Consiglio Nazionale dei Dottori Commercialisti (Italy) joined the IASC board in 1983 and remained until 1995.
- The National Federation of Certified Public Accountants Associations of the Republic of China became a member of IFAC Council in 1983 and in 1984 began a three-year term as the second accountancy body from East Asia, after Japan, represented on the IASC Board.
- Denmark became a member in 1988, replaced in 1990 by the Nordic Federation of Public Accountants (represented by Danes, Swedes and Norwegians, since the Fins and Icelandics were not interested in participating).
- Korea sent a delegation from 1988 to 1992.
- A Jordanian delegation served on the Board from 1989 to 1995 which was constituted by the Arab Society of Certified Accountants.
- The Institute of Chartered Accountants of India (ICAI) became an associate member in 1974 and joined the board in 1993. In 1995, India began sharing the delegation with the Institute of Chartered Accountants of Sri Lanka.
- The Malaysian Association of Certified Public Accountants became an associate member in 1975 (later joined by the Institut Akauntan Malaysia, the Malaysian Institute of Accountants), and was a member of the board from 1995 to 2000.

Between 1973 and the change in the IASC's Constitution which made all IFAC members IASC members, a total of 46 accountancy bodies were admitted as associate members, including: the New Zealand Society of Accountants (1974); the Institute of Chartered Accountants of Pakistan and the Pakistan Institute of Industrial Accountants (1974); the Singapore Society of Accountants (1975); the Hong Kong Society of Accountants (1975).

The IASC's constitution as revised in 1982 provided for a limited expansion of the board's membership beyond the organized accountancy profession. Up to four organizations having an interest in financial reporting could now be invited to be represented on the board. As a result, three non-auditor delegations were added over time, all remaining on the board until the end of the IASC:

- 1986: The International Co-ordinating Committee of Financial Analysts Associations (since 1988 known as the International Council of Investment Associations).
- 1995: The Federation of Swiss Industrial Holding Companies.
- 1996: The International Association of Financial Executives Institutes.

== Organization ==
At the core of the IASC was the committee, or board, consisting of delegations from the member bodies. The board typically met three to four times a year for two or three days in locations around the world. It was served by a permanent secretariat based in London. The technical agenda of the board was prepared by working groups known as steering committees, each appointed to develop proposals for a new or modified standard on a specific topic. Steering committee membership was on an individual, not institutional, basis, but appointment was based on recommendation by an IASC member body, industry organization or similar grouping.

From the start, the IASC adopted the practice of issuing draft standards (exposure drafts) for public comment before agreeing on a final standard. This allowed a degree of wider participation in the standard-setting work even though in practice a large proportion of the responses came from accountancy bodies, audit firms and national accounting standard setters. In 1981, the IASC established a Consultative Group, with a view to engaging a broader set of organizations in its work.

In 1996, the IASC set up a Standing Interpretations Committee (SIC), charged with issuing interpretations of standards on relatively narrow issues arising in practice.

Leadership of the IASC was provided by the chairman of the board and head of the secretariat (the Secretary, known since 1984 as Secretary-General):

=== Chairmen of the IASC ===
- Sir Henry Benson (UK, 1973-1976)
- Joseph Cummings (USA, 1976-1978)
- John Hepworth (Australia, 1978-1980)
- Hans Burggraaff (The Netherlands, 1980-1982)
- Stephen Elliott (Canada, 1982-1985)
- John Kirkpatrick (UK, 1985-1987)
- George Barthès de Ruyter (France, 1985-1987)
- Arthur Wyatt (US, 1990-1992)
- Eiichi Shiratori (Japan, 1993-1995)
- Michael Sharpe (Australia, 1995-1997)
- Stig Enevoldsen (Denmark, 1998-2000)
- Thomas Jones (US, 2000-2001)

All but Enevoldsen were from one of the founder member countries. All but Jones were partners in audit firms.

=== Secretaries and Secretaries-General ===
- Paul Rosenfield (US, 1973-1975)
- John Brennan (Canada, 1975-1977)
- Roy Nash (US, 1977-1979)
- Allan Cook (UK, 1979-1981)
- Geoffrey Mitchell (Australia, 1982-1985)
- David Cairns (UK, 1985-1994)
- Liesel Knorr (Germany, 1995-1995)
- Sir Bryan Carsberg (UK, 1995-2001)

== Standards ==
Starting with IAS 1 Disclosure of Accounting Policies, published in 1975, the IASC issued 41 International Accounting Standards, each dealing with a specific financial reporting topic. Over time, standards were amended or replaced. When the IASC was replaced by the IASB, 34 standards were still extant and adopted by the IASB.

The original aim of the IASC was to issue 'basic' standards. In practice, this meant that the standards often reflected common, rather than best practices in the board member countries. Several standards contained alternative treatments (options), reflecting the diversity of practice. For instance, IAS 2 Valuation and Presentation of Inventories in the Context of the Historical Cost System (1975) allowed a variety of practices including the LIFO, FIFO and base stock methods. For this reason, the IASC was sometimes criticized for taking a 'lowest common denominator' approach. However, some of the early standards prescribed practices that were not yet commonly followed in many countries, including several board member countries. IAS 3 Consolidated Financial Statements and the Equity Method of Accounting (1976) required the presentation of consolidated financial statements by parents of subsidiary companies. This was well before the Seventh Company Law Directive (1983) made this mandatory in the member states of the European Economic Community. IAS 17 Accounting for Leases (1982) required the capitalization of finance leases, a practice that was as yet unusual or unknown outside the United States.

In 1987, the IASC adopted a new strategy of strengthening its standards to make them a suitable basis for financial reporting by companies seeking cross-border stock market listings. In doing so, it was encouraged by the International Organization of Securities Commissions (IOSCO) which in 1988 signaled its willingness to consider an improved set of IAS as the basis for preparing financial information in multinational prospectuses. As US capital markets were among the most important in the world, this meant above all that the IASC had to bring its standards more in line with US Generally Accepted Accounting Principles (US GAAP) in order to gain acceptance by the US Securities and Exchange Commission (SEC), a key IOSCO member. In 1987, the IASC embarked on a project to revise its extant standards. The revisions included the elimination of options, the expansion of disclosure requirements and additional guidance for the application of the standards. The revisions were completed in 1992. As this did not yet satisfy IOSCO, the IASC embarked on a new work programme to revise its standards, and to add standards on topics that were not yet, or only partially covered, such as accounting for financial instruments. This 'core standards' programme was completed under strong time pressure in 1998 with the publication of IAS 39 Financial Instruments: Recognition and Measurement.

== Impact ==
According to the IASC's Constitution, the member bodies were committed to use their 'best endeavours' with reporting companies, their auditors, governments and securities market regulators to ensure that published financial statements complied with IAS, and that audit reports referred to any non-compliance. In the absence of large-scale global surveys of corporate reporting practices for the 1970s and 1980s, it is not possible to assess with any degree of precision to what degree reporting companies adopted IAS. In the early 1980s, a number of Canadian listed companies began to assert compliance with IAS in their financial statements, but this seems to have been the case in few other countries. One explanation of this limited direct impact is that in most countries, national accountancy bodies had no authority to force companies to adopt IAS. This does not rule out an indirect influence of IAS, as national accounting standards in a range of countries incorporated elements of the national standards in national requirements.

The efforts of the IASC, from 1987 onwards, to improve its standards in order to make them an acceptable basis for cross-border listings led to greater recognition. During the 1990s, a number of major European companies began to prepare financial statements on the basis of US GAAP because of actual or planned listings in the United States. Others adopted IAS which was increasingly seen as a set of standards of sufficient quality for international capital markets. In 1998, German companies were allowed to satisfy their legal reporting requirements in Germany by publishing consolidated financial statements based on 'internationally recognized principles of accounting', which in practice meant either US GAAP or IAS.
