= IFRS 16 =

International guidance on keeping record of lease transactions

IFRS 16 is an International Financial Reporting Standard (IFRS) promulgated by the International Accounting Standards Board (IASB) providing guidance on accounting for leases. IFRS 16 was issued in January 2016 and is effective for most companies that report under IFRS since 1 January 2019. Upon becoming effective, it replaced the earlier leasing standard, IAS 17.

IFRS 16 has a substantial impact on the financial statements of lessees of property and equipment – requiring that leases be placed on-balance sheet by recognising a ‘right-of-use’ asset and a lease liability.

== Motivation to introduce IFRS 16 ==
According to IASB chairman Hans Hoogervorst, “These new accounting requirements bring lease accounting into the 21st century, ending the guesswork involved when calculating a company’s often-substantial lease obligation. The new standard will provide much-needed transparency on companies’ lease assets and liabilities, meaning that off balance sheet lease financing is no longer lurking in the shadows. It will also improve comparability between companies that lease and those that borrow to buy.”

Disclosures made by public companies about the impact of IFRS 16 on their financial statements are a point of focus of European financial regulatory authorities.

== Accounting by lessors ==
IFRS 16 substantially carries forward the lessor accounting requirements in IAS 17. Accordingly, a lessor continues to classify its leases as operating leases or finance leases.

== Transition from IAS 17 ==
Lessees are not required to follow the retrospective application requirements of IAS 8. IFRS 16 allows a modified retrospective approach under which comparative periods are not restated. Instead, the cumulative effects of applying IFRS 16 are recognised as an adjustment to the opening balance of equity at the application date.

== Convergence with US GAAP ==
IFRS 16 was developed in collaboration with the Financial Accounting Standards Board (FASB) in the United States, but while the new FASB leasing standard shares many common features with IFRS 16, such as reporting all large leases on the balance sheet, there will be some significant differences between the two standards. In particular, lessees no longer classify their leases between operating and finance under IFRS 16, but will continue to do so under US GAAP.
