= IAS 14 =

IAS 14 Segment Reporting is a former International Accounting Standard that was fully withdrawn in 2009 and superseded by IFRS 8 Operating Segments. IAS 14 set guidelines on disclosing information by business segment in a company's financial statements.

== History ==
A timeline of IAS 14

| Date | Development |
|---|---|
| March 1980 | Exposure Draft E15 Reporting Financial Information by Segment |
| August 1981 | IAS 14 Reporting Financial Information by Segment |
| January 1983 | Effective date of IAS 14 (1981) |
| January 1994 | IAS 14 (1981) was reformatted |
| December 1995 | Exposure Draft E51 Reporting Financial Information by Segment |
| August 1997 | IAS 14 Segment Reporting (1997) |
| November 2006 | IAS 14 is superseded by IFRS 8 Operating Segments effective for annual periods beginning 1 January 2009 |

== General issues in segment reporting ==
With the increase in size, complexity and scope of operations of businesses, financial statement users began to demand a breakdown, in the footnotes to company financial statements, of aggregate numbers such as sales and profit. This demand arose in particular with regard to diversified conglomerates with activities in different industries, but also with regard to companies active in different geographical areas. Since the 1980s, if not before, it is generally accepted that large, listed companies should provide some form of segment reporting. Within this general consensus, a number of issues remain to be resolved:

- The principles for identifying reportable segments. In general, these can be identified in terms of type of activity (industries) or along geographical lines. What this means in practice also depends on the level of aggregation and therefore the number of segments to be identified.
- What information to report for each segment: this might range from a single number for sales revenue to complete income statements and balance sheets per segment.
- The definitions of segment numbers. While numbers such as 'profit' and 'sales revenue' are well defined at company level in accounting standards, this is not necessarily true for segment numbers. These may be affected, for instance, by intra-group transactions and allocation of corporate-level income or expense items.

== Main features of IAS 14 ==
As issued in 1981, IAS 14 required a company to disclose revenue, results (profit) and total assets for both geographical and industry segments. Although it provided only limited guidance on segment identification, its disclosure requirements went further than national requirements in a number of countries.

In 1992, a process to revise IAS 14 began. The main question was whether the standard should focus on comparability of segment numbers across reporting companies, and thus on standardization, or whether the focus should be on providing the most relevant company-specific information. In the latter case, the guiding principle is that segment reporting should be based on the information as provided to a company's management, also known as the 'management approach' or the 'through-the-eyes-of-management' principle. At the time IAS 14 was revised, the US Financial Accounting Standards Board adopted the management approach. In the revised IAS 14, the IASC adopted a limited version of the management approach: segment identification should follow the internal reporting structure, but with additional requirements to guarantee a minimum number of reportable segments. Regardless of whether a company reported internally along both industry and geographical lines, the segment disclosures should include both, although one of the two perspectives could be classified as secondary, with lower disclosure requirements. In another departure from the management approach, IAS 14 required that segment numbers should be based on the accounting policies used in the consolidated financial statements, although additional numbers based in internal reporting practices might be added.

== Differences between IAS 14 and IFRS 8 ==
IFRS 8 represents a shift by the IASB to the management approach. In IFRS 8, segment identification and the definitions of segment numbers are based on information as reported to the entity's top management ('chief operating decision maker'), with some requirements of minimal disclosures by segment. Reported segment income statement numbers should be reconciled to their closest counterpart in the consolidated income statement, to show the effect of different accounting policies used in segment reporting and the consolidated financial statements, as well as any unallocated corporate income and expense items.
