= Consolidated financial statement =

Concept in accounting

A consolidated financial statement (CFS) is the "financial statement of a group in which the assets, liabilities, equity, income, expenses and cash flows of the parent company and its subsidiaries are presented as those of a single economic entity", according to the definitions stated in International Accounting Standard 27, "Consolidated and separate financial statements", and International Financial Reporting Standard 10, "Consolidated financial statements".

== Consolidated statement of financial position ==
Consolidated accounts are prepared after the accounts for the constituent companies have been prepared. While preparing a consolidated financial statement, there are two basic procedures that need to be followed: first, cancelling out all the items that are accounted as an asset in one company and a liability in another, and then adding together all uncancelled items.

There are two main type of items that cancel each other out from the consolidated statement of financial position.

- "Investment in subsidiary companies" which is treated as an asset in the parent company will be cancelled out by "share capital" account in subsidiary's statement. Only the parent company's "share capital" account will be included in the consolidated statement.
- If trading between different companies in one group takes place, then the payables of one company will be cancelled out by the receivables of another company.

== Legislation ==
In the United Kingdom, section 399 of the Companies Act 2006 requires parent company directors to prepare group accounts unless an exemption applies. Small groups are exempt, where the balance sheet total is below £7.5 million, annual turnover is less than £15 million, or the average number of employees is below 50. Two of these three conditions must be met.

== Specific approaches to consolidation ==
=== Goodwill arising on consolidation ===
Goodwill is treated as an intangible asset in the consolidated statement of financial position. It arises in cases where the cost of purchase of shares is not equal to their par value. For example, if a company buys shares of another company worth $40,000 for $60,000, there is a goodwill worth $20,000.

Proforma for calculating goodwill is as follows:

Goodwill

Fair value of consideration transferred

Plus fair value of non-controlled interest at acquisition

Less ordinary share capital of subsidiary company

Less share premium of subsidiary company

Less retained earnings of subsidiary company at acquisition date

Less fair value adjustments at acquisition date

=== Non-controlling interests ===
If the parent company does not own 100% of shares of the subsidiary company, there is a proportion of the net assets owned by an external shareholder. This proportion that is related to outside investors is called the minority interest or non-controlling interest (NCI).

The proforma for calculating the NCI is as follows:

Non-controlling interest

Fair value of NCI at acquisition date

Plus NCI's share of post-acquisition retained earnings or other reserves

=== Intra-group trading ===
A group of companies may have trade relations with each other, for example, where company A buys goods for one price and sells them to another company inside the group for another price. Thus, company A has earned some revenue from selling, but the group as a whole did not make any profit out of that transaction. Until those goods are sold to an outsider company, the group has unrealised profit.

== See also ==
- Associate company
- Business valuation
- Consolidation (business)
- Enterprise value
- Minority interest
