= IFRS 9 =

Accounting standard

IFRS 9 is an International Financial Reporting Standard (IFRS) published by the International Accounting Standards Board (IASB). It addresses the accounting for financial instruments. It contains three main topics: classification and measurement of financial instruments, impairment of financial assets and hedge accounting. The standard came into force on 1 January 2018, replacing the earlier IFRS for financial instruments, IAS 39.

== History ==
IFRS 9 began as a joint project between IASB and the Financial Accounting Standards Board (FASB), which promulgates accounting standards in the United States. The boards published a joint discussion paper in March 2008 proposing an eventual goal of reporting all financial instruments at fair value, with all changes in fair value reported in net income (FASB) or profit and loss (IASB). Due to the 2008 financial crisis, the boards revised their accounting standards for financial instruments to address perceived deficiencies which were believed to have contributed to the magnitude of the crisis.

The boards disagreed on several important issues, and also took different approaches to developing the new financial instruments standard. FASB attempted to develop a comprehensive standard that would address classification and measurement, impairment and hedge accounting at the same time, and issued an exposure draft of a standard addressing all three components in 2010. In contrast, the IASB attempted to develop the new standard in phases, releasing each component of the new standard separately. In 2009, IASB issued the first portion of IFRS, covering classification and measurement of financial assets. This was intended to replace the asset classification and measurement sections of IAS 39, but not supersede other sections of IAS 39. In 2010, IASB issued another portion of IFRS 9, primarily covering classification and measurement of financial liabilities and also addressing aspects of applying fair value option and bifurcating embedded derivatives.

Certain elements of IFRS 9 as issued were criticized by some key IASB constituents. The model for classifying debt instrument assets permitted only two approaches, fair value with all changes in fair value reported in profit and loss (FVPL), or amortized cost. This represented a significant deviation from FASB decisions, which would also have a category of fair value with certain changes in fair value reported in other comprehensive income (FVOCI). In addition to creating significant divergence with FASB, the lack of a FVOCI category would have been inconsistent with the accounting model being developed by the IASB for insurance contracts. There were also concerns that the criteria for qualifying for the amortized cost category were overly stringent and would force many financial instruments to be reported at fair value even though they could be appropriately accounted for at amortized cost. To address these concerns, IASB issued an exposure draft in 2012 proposing limited amendments to the classification and measurement of financial instruments.

Meanwhile, IASB and FASB worked together to develop a model for impairment of financial assets. IASB issued an exposure draft proposing an impairment model in 2013. FASB decided to propose an alternative impairment model. IASB was also developing its hedge accounting model independently of FASB, and issued that portion of the IFRS 9 standard in 2013. The final IFRS 9 standard, including hedge accounting, impairment, and the amended classification and measurement guidance, was issued on 24 July 2014.

Early evidence on the market reaction to the IFRS 9 in Europe suggests overall a positive response to the IFRS 9, although heterogeneities across countries exist.

== Classification and measurement ==
As amended, IFRS 9 had four possible classification categories for financial assets, including a FVOCI classification for debt instruments. The classification is dependent on two tests, a contractual cash flow test (named SPPI as Solely Payments of Principal and Interest) and a business model assessment. Unless the asset meets the requirements of both tests, it is measured at fair value with all changes in fair value reporting in profit and loss (FVPL). In order to meet the contractual cash flow test, the cash flows from the instrument must consist of only principal and interest. Among the amendments to classification and measurement made in the 2014 update, de minimis and "non-genuine" features can be disregarded from the test, meaning that a de minimis feature would not preclude an instrument from being reported at amortized cost or FVOCI. However, equity instruments, derivatives and instruments that contain other than de minimis embedded derivatives would have to be reported at FVPL.

If the asset passes the contractual cash flows test, the business model assessment determines how the instrument is classified. If the instrument is being held to collect contractual cash flows, i.e., it is not expected to be sold, it is classified as amortized cost. If the business model for the instrument is to both collect contractual cash flows and potentially sell the asset, it is reported at FVOCI. For a FVOCI asset, the amortized cost basis is used to determine profit and loss, but the asset is reported at fair value on the balance sheet, with the difference between amortized cost and fair value reported in other comprehensive income. For any other business model, such as holding the asset for trading, the asset is reported at FVPL.

IFRS 9 retained most of the measurement guidance for liabilities from IAS 39, meaning most financial liabilities are held at amortized cost, the only change relating to liabilities that utilize the fair value option. For those liabilities, the change in fair value related to the entity's own credit standing is reported in other comprehensive income rather than profit and loss.

IFRS 9 retained the concept of fair value option from IAS 39, but revised the criteria for financial assets. Under a fair value option, an asset or liability that would otherwise be reported at amortized cost or FVOCI can use FVPL instead. IFRS 9 also incorporated a FVOCI option for certain equity instruments that are not held for trading. Under this option, the instrument is reported at FVOCI similar to FVOCI for debt. However, this version of FVOCI does not permit "recycling." Whereas when debt instruments using FVOCI are sold, the gain or loss on sale is "recycled" from other comprehensive income to profit and loss, for FVOCI equities the gain or loss is never reported in profit and loss, but rather remains in other comprehensive income.

== Impairment ==
IFRS 9 requires an impairment allowance against the amortized cost of financial assets held at amortized cost or FVOCI. The change in this allowance is reported in profit and loss. For most such assets, when the asset is acquired the impairment allowance is measured as the present value of credit losses from default events projected over the next 12 months. The allowance will continue to be based on the expected losses from defaults on the receivables recognised at the balance sheet date in the next 12 months following, unless there is a significant increase in credit risk ("SICR"). If there is a significant increase in credit risk, the allowance is measured as the present value of all credit losses projected for the instrument over its full lifetime. If the credit risk recovers, the allowance can once again be limited to the projected credit losses over the following 12 months.

An exception to the general impairment model applies to financial assets that are credit impaired when they were originally acquired. For these assets, the impairment allowance is always based on the change in projected lifetime credit losses since the asset was acquired.

The new impairment model is intended to address a criticism of the impairment model used during the 2008 financial crisis, that it allowed companies to delay recognition of asset impairments. The new model requires companies to more quickly recognize projected lifetime losses. FASB elected to use a different approach to accelerating recognition of impairment losses, requiring full lifetime recognition from the time the asset is acquired, referred to as the Current Expected Credit Losses or CECL model. Under both IFRS 9 and the FASB model there will be a loss, to the extent of the allowance, when most assets covered by this guidance are acquired. This loss will be smaller under the IFRS 9 model, due to the 12 month limit.

== Hedge accounting ==
IFRS 9 updated the guidance for hedge accounting. The intent was to "[align] the accounting treatment with risk management activities, enabling entities to reflect better these activities in their financial statements." The changes also make it more feasible for non-financial entities to use hedge accounting. The changes permit more use of hedge accounting for components of instruments and groups of contracts, and ease the hedge effectiveness test; see Hedge relationship (finance). They also enhance the disclosures related to hedges and risk management with a requirement to refer to a formal risk management strategy or describe it clearly in the hedge documentation.

== See also ==
- IFRS 7, Financial Instruments: Disclosures
- List of International Financial Reporting Standards
