= Money measurement concept =

Basis of measurement

The money measurement concept (also called monetary measurement concept) underlines the fact that in accounting and economics generally, every recorded event or transaction is measured in terms of money, the local currency monetary unit of measure. Using this principle, a fact or a happening or event which cannot be expressed in terms of money is not recorded in the accounting books. Thus, it is not acceptable to record such non-quantifiable items as employee skill levels or the quality of great customer service.

One of the basic principles in historical cost accounting is "The Measuring Unit principle" (or stable measuring unit assumption): The unit of measure in accounting shall be the base money unit of the most relevant currency.

This principle also assumes the unit of measure is stable; that is, changes in its general purchasing power are not considered sufficiently important to require adjustments to the basic financial statements. The inflation which occurs over the passage of time is not considered. Only those are consider which can be measured in the term of money or which are financial in nature.
