= IFRS 15 =

Accounting standard

IFRS 15 is an International Financial Reporting Standard (IFRS) promulgated by the International Accounting Standards Board (IASB) providing guidance on accounting for revenue from contracts with customers. It was adopted in 2014 and became effective in January 2018. It was the subject of a joint project with the Financial Accounting Standards Board (FASB), which issues accounting guidance in the United States, and the guidance is substantially similar between the two boards.

== History ==
A main purpose of the project to develop IFRS 15 was that, although revenue is a critical metric for financial statement users, there were important differences between the IASB and FASB definitions of revenue, and there were different definitions of revenue even within each board's guidance for similar transactions accounting for under different standards. The IASB also believed that its guidance for revenue was not sufficiently detailed.

The IASB began working on its revenue project in 2002. The boards released their first discussion paper describing their views on accounting for revenue in 2008, and they released exposure drafts of a proposed standard in 2010 and 2011. The final standard was issued on 28 May 2014.

== Revenue model ==
The IFRS 15 revenue model has five steps:

1. Identify the contract with a customer
2. Identify all the individual performance obligations within the contract
3. Determine the transaction price
4. Allocate the price to the performance obligations
5. Recognize revenue as the performance obligations are fulfilled

Relative to previous accounting guidance, IFRS 15 may cause revenue to be recognized earlier in some cases, but later in others.

=== Identify the contract with a customer ===
According to IFRS 15, the following criteria have to be met before a contract can be identified;

1. both parties have to approve the contract and are committed to perform;
2. and the entity can identify each party's rights and obligations in terms of the contract; and
3. there are clear payment terms in the contract, and the contract has “commercial substance”.

Identifying the contract can be as simple as standard business practice, such as taking a product to a cashier and paying the cashier, then leaving with the product.

=== Identify all the individual performance obligations within the contract ===
A goods or service that is to be delivered in terms of a contract with a customer qualifies as a performance obligation if the goods or service is “distinct”. In this context a goods or service is distinct if:

- The stipulated item can be consumed by the customer, either on its own, or in combination with other items that are regularly available to the customer; and
- The promise to transfer goods or services to a customer can be separately identified from other transfers stipulated in the contract.

=== Determine the transaction price ===
In most cases the transaction price to be paid will be stipulated in the contract and quite easy to calculate; however certain circumstances require that a transaction price should be estimated by other methods.

Firstly, an entity has to measure the amount of non-cash consideration in a contract in terms of IFRS 13: fair value measurement.

Secondly, a contract can have variable consideration (for example, the transaction price is subject to settlement discount should the client pay within a certain time frame). In this case, the transaction price can be calculated by two methods:

- The most likely amount: the amount that of considerations that has the highest probability of realizing will be measured as the transaction price, or
- Expected value approach; in this case the weighted average of possible amounts will be measured as the transaction price.

Both of the above-mentioned are estimates, and should the estimates change, the entity will apply the change prospectively in terms of the criteria of IAS 8.

Lastly IFRS 15 requires that the entity should test for the existence of a “significant financing component” in the contract, this will occur if: “the timing of payments agreed by the parties to the contract provides the customer or the entity with a significant benefit of financing the transfer of goods or services to the customer”

If the above-mentioned is applicable, the transaction price will be adjusted to eliminate the effect of this benefit. This is simply done by calculating the net present value of the payments (if the satisfaction of performance obligations is prior to the payment date), or by calculating the net future value (if the payment date is prior to the satisfaction of performance obligations). The difference (between the amount recognized after adjustment for a significant financing component and amount of consideration to be received) is simply recognized as interest income/ expense in terms of the accrual basis of accounting as mentioned in IAS 1.

=== Recognize revenue as the performance obligations fulfilled (Service) ===
An entity can recognize revenue when performance obligations have been settled, a performance obligation has been settled when the customer has received all the benefits associated with the performance obligation, and is able to use and enjoy the asset to his or her own discretion.

=== Performance obligations settled over time ===
The performance obligations will be settled in the measure of progress towards completion, the measure of progress can be either based on the inputs (in the case of manufactured goods), or the output method.

== Recognition of a contract asset ==
IFRS 15 introduced a new accounting term: contract asset. It is an asset corresponding to accrued revenue when the payment from a customer is conditional not only on the passage of time and hence a typical trade receivable cannot be recognized.

== Effective date ==
(Kit) IFRS 15, as amended, is effective for the first interim period within annual reporting periods beginning on or after January 1, 2018, with early adoption permitted. The FASB's standard (ASC 606) is effective for public entities for the first interim period within annual reporting periods beginning after December 15, 2017 (nonpublic companies have an additional year).
