= IAS 19 =

International financial reporting standard

IAS 19 or International Accounting Standard Nineteen rule concerning employee benefits under the IFRS rules set by the International Accounting Standards Board. In this case, "employee benefits" includes wages and salaries as well as pensions, life insurance, and other perquisites.

The rules in IAS 19 explains the accounting for longer term employee benefits and post employment plans such as defined benefit retirement plans. Accordingly, most of the standard is taken up with explaining the rules for long term employee benefits.

== Defined benefit pension plans as a type of post-employment benefit plan ==
Defined benefit pension plans will offer various types of benefit according to the mode by which the employee leaves the employer. For example, if the employee remains in employment until his retirement age, then he may be entitled to a pension, often calculated by reference to his average salary in the period running up to their exit. The pension might be payable for the remainder of his life, and when he/she dies, at a reduced rate to his/her spouse for the remainder of his/her life. But if he leaves service before being entitled to a pension, he might receive a benefit such as a return of contributions, or a deferred pension payable from normal retirement age, depending on length of service. In many cases, defined benefit pension plans are funded and hold assets in order to meet those promised benefits. A defined benefit pension plan is an example of a post-employment benefit plan.

== Accounting for defined benefit pension plans in IAS 19 ==
Accounting for the costs and liabilities relating to such plans raises several issues. These include the following (note that paragraph references refer to IAS19 before it was revised in June 2011):

- The methodology that should be used to place a value on the benefits to which an employee is entitled, given that benefits vary according to mode of exit from employment. Actuarial mathematics is typically used and this methodology is specified by Paragraph 50(a) of IAS 19.
- Using actuarial valuation methods, how liabilities should be apportioned in respect of “earned” and “unearned" service. A related issue is how the cost relating to the accrual of benefits in the plan over the most recent accounting period should be calculated. An actuarial funding method known as the “projected unit method” is prescribed by IAS 19 (paragraph 50(b) of IAS 19).
- The principles need to be specified regarding how to choose the financial assumptions to calculate liabilities. The main choices are that either these should be market-driven or based on other “long term” (and typically more subjective) assumptions. IAS 19 prescribes market-based assumptions (paragraph 77 of IAS 19).
- Within that market-based framework, the method needs to be specified that should be used to select assumptions such as the discount rate. IAS prescribes that the discount rate should be based on high quality corporate bonds (usually interpreted as corporate bonds with a credit rating of AA) (paragraphs 78-82 of IAS 19).
- “Surplus” (the excess of assets over liabilities) can be increased or reduced when actuarial assumptions are not realised, and the accounting method needs to specify how to treat such increases and decreases. IAS 19 permits these to be recognised immediately outside the profit and loss account or to be spread over several years within the profit and loss account to the extent that they exceed a specified threshold (paragraphs 92-93A of IAS 19).
- Liabilities may increase or decrease when there is a change to the benefits of the plan, and the accounting method needs to specify how to treat such increases or decreases. IAS 19 generally requires these to be recognised immediately. (IAS 19 refers to these costs as “past service” costs, and these are amortized on a straight line basis over the period that the benefit “vests”).
- The accounting treatment of the situation when the employer sells off part or the whole of its operation (a “settlement”) needs to be specified. Similarly, the accounting treatment of the situation where the employer reduces its complement of staff or closes the plan (a “curtailment”) needs to be specified. IAS 19 requires that gains or losses in assets and actuarial liabilities and any unamortized past service cost should be recognised when the settlement or curtailment occurs (paragraphs 109-115 of IAS 19).
- It is often quite difficult for an employer to recover substantial surplus assets from the plan. This may be taken into account by accounting standards for pension costs, and IAS 19 does this by imposing an upper limit on the asset which can be included on the balance sheet (paragraph 58 of IAS 19).
