= DIRTI 5 =

In accounting and economics, the DIRTI 5 is an acronym for "depreciation, interest, repairs, taxes, and insurance". Total fixed cost includes the DIRTI 5, which are unavoidable for any capital asset of significant value.
