= IFRS 2 =

IFRS 2 is an international financial reporting standard issued in February 2004 by the International Accounting Standards Board (IASB) to provide guidance on the accounting for share based payments.

Its purpose is to reflect the cost of awarding equity or equity based incentives to employees or other parties in exchange for goods or services.
