= IAS 12 =

IAS 12: Income Taxes is part of the International Accounting Standards (IAS) and International Financial Reporting Standards (IFRS). IAS 12 sets the accounting treatment of all taxable profits and losses, both national and foreign.

== History ==
Timeline of IAS 12:

Date	Development
April 1978	Exposure Draft E13 Accounting for Taxes on Income published
July 1979	IAS 12 Accounting for Taxes on Income issued
January 1989	Exposure Draft E33 Accounting for Taxes on Income published
January 1994	IAS 12 (1979) was reformatted
October 1994	Exposure Draft E49 Income Taxes published
October 1996	IAS 12 Income Taxes issued
October 2000	Limited Revisions to IAS 12 published (tax consequences of dividends)
March 2009	Exposure Draft ED/2009/2 Income Tax published
September 2010	Exposure Draft ED/2010/11 Deferred Tax: Recovery of Underlying Assets (Proposed amendments to IAS 12) published
December 2010	Amended by Deferred Tax: Recovery of Underlying Assets
January 2016	Amended by Recognition of Deferred Tax Assets for Unrealised Losses

== Content ==
The taxable amount a company is liable for is composed of its tax base multiplied with the relevant tax rate in its country of settlement. The tax base for a company will in general be the final amount reported in the statement of profit or loss plus or minus any comprehensive income or loss. There are however situations where the accounting profit may differ from the taxable profit. This difference that arises most likely needs to be settled in a future period. Therefore the difference needs to be recognised on the balance sheet as a tax asset or liability. A tax asset is only recognisable to the extent that is likely to be recovered in the future, where a tax liability always needs to be recognised in full.
