= IAS 39 =

IAS 39: Financial Instruments: Recognition and Measurement was an international accounting standard which outlined the requirements for the recognition and measurement of financial assets, financial liabilities, and some contracts to buy or sell non-financial items. It was released by the International Accounting Standards Board (IASB) in 2003, and was replaced in 2014 by IFRS 9, which became effective in 2018.

It was adopted by the European Union in 2004.

In 2005, the EU also introduced the fair value and hedging provision of the amended version of IAS 39.

The EU version was changed at the end of 2008 in response to the 2008 financial crisis. The comparative accounting measures in the United States are FAS 133 and FAS 157. The Financial Accounting Standards Board (FASB) released a 'FASB Staff Position' statement in October 2008, in response to the 2008 financial crisis.
