= Revaluation of fixed assets =

Financial action

In finance, a revaluation of fixed assets is an action that may be required to accurately describe the true value of the capital goods a business owns. This should be distinguished from planned depreciation, where the recorded decline in the value of an asset is tied to its age.

Fixed assets are held by an enterprise for the purpose of producing goods or rendering services, as opposed to being held for resale for the normal course of business. An example, machines, buildings, patents, or licenses can be fixed assets of a business.

The purpose of a revaluation is to bring into the books the fair market value of fixed assets. This may be helpful in order to decide whether to invest in another business. If a company wants to sell one of its assets, it is revalued in preparation for sales negotiations.

== Reasons for revaluation ==
It is common to see companies revaluing their fixed assets. It is important to make a distinction between a 'private' revaluation and a 'public' revaluation which is carried out in the financial reports. The purposes are varied:

- To show the true rate of return on capital employed.
- To conserve adequate funds in the business for replacement of fixed assets at the end of their useful lives. Provision for depreciation based on historical cost will show inflated profits and lead to payment of excessive dividends.
- To show the fair market value of assets which have considerably appreciated since their purchase such as land and buildings.
- To negotiate fair price for the assets of the company before merger with or acquisition by another company.
- To enable proper internal reconstruction and external reconstruction.
- To issue shares to existing shareholders (rights issue or follow-on offering).
- To get fair market value of assets, in case of sale-and-leaseback transaction.
- When the company intends to take a loan from banks or financial institutions by mortgaging its fixed assets. Proper revaluation of assets would enable the company to get a higher amount of loan.
- Sale of an individual asset or group of assets.
- In financial firms revaluation reserves are required for regulatory reasons. They are included when calculating a firm's funds to give a fairer view of resources. Only a portion of the firm's total funds (usually about 20%) can be loaned or in the hands of any one counterparty at any one time (large exposures restrictions).
- To decrease the debt-to-equity ratio ("leverage ratio").

== Methods of revaluation of fixed assets ==
The common methods used in revaluing assets are:

=== Indexation ===
Under this method, indices are applied to the cost value of the assets, to arrive at the current cost of the assets. The Indices by the country's departments of Statistical Bureau or Economic Surveys may be used for the revaluation of assets.

=== Current Market Price (CMP) ===
- Land values can be estimated by using recent prices for similar plots of land sold in the area. However, certain adjustments will have to be made for the plus and minus points of the land possessed by the company. This may be done with the assistance of brokers and agencies dealing in land, or by a licensed appraiser.
- Buildings values can be estimated by a real estate agent (or broker or dealer) or Chartered Surveyor (in the UK) in a similar manner to land.
- Plant and Machinery: The CMP can be obtained from suppliers of the assets concerned. This may not be possible if brands are unavailable in the market due to the closure of companies manufacturing them. Similarly, a direct CMP may not be available for a model that has been discontinued or changed by the manufacturer. Comparison of assets to most similar types available for sale, new or used, can provide an estimate of value.

CMP of an existing asset = CMP of comparable new asset × remaining useful life of asset ÷ original useful life of asset.

=== Appraisal method ===
Under this method, technical experts are called in to carry out a detailed examination of the assets with a view to determining their fair market value. A proper appraisal is necessary when the company is taking out an insurance policy for the protection of its fixed assets. It ensures that the fixed assets are neither over-insured nor under-insured. The factors which are considered in determining the value of an asset, are as follows:

- Date of purchase.
- Extent of use i.e. single shift, double shift, triple shift.
- Type of asset. Whether the asset is a general purpose or special purpose asset?
- Repairs and Maintenance policy of the enterprise.
- Availability of spares in the future, mainly in the case of imported machines.
- Future demand for the product manufactured by an asset.
- If the asset is part of a bigger fixed asset, the life of the latter is crucial.

=== Selective revaluation ===
Selective revaluation can be defined as the revaluation of specific assets within a class or all assets within a specific location.

A manufacturing company may have its manufacturing facilities spread over different locations. Suppose it decides to undertake a revaluation of its plant and machinery. Selective revaluation will mean revaluing specific assets (such as the boiler, heater, central air-conditioning system) at all locations, or revaluing all items of Plant and Machinery at a particular location only. Such revaluation will lead to unrepresentative amounts being shown in the fixed asset register (FAR). In case of revaluation of specific assets of a class, while some assets will be shown at a revalued amount others will be shown at historical cost. The same will happen in case of revaluation of all assets of plant and machinery at a particular location only.

It is not consistent to value and depreciate fixed assets using different bases. Therefore, selective revaluation is generally not considered best practice.

=== Preliminary considerations ===
Revaluation will typically require liaison between the company's Production Department, Accounts Department, Technical Department, and external appraisers. To commission the project they should set out their conclusions to the following questions:

- Why is the revaluation necessary?
- What is the most suitable method, taking into account the type of fixed assets, statutory requirements, availability of required information? Should the values arrived at by one method be crosschecked with the values derived from another method?
- What assets are to be revalued?
- What is the period within which the revaluation has to be completed?
- What guidelines should be laid down for the revaluation?
- What modifications will be required in the FAR to show revalued figures in place of historical figures? Similarly, depreciation will be computed twice. One takes into account the historical cost, and the other as per revalued figures.

== Upward revaluation ==
The FASB in the U.S. does not allow upward revaluation of fixed assets to reflect fair market values although it is compulsory to account for impairment costs in fixed assets (downward revaluation of fixed assets) as per FASB Statement No. 144, Accounting for the Impairment or Disposal of Long-Lived Assets.

In other countries, upward revaluation is mainly done for fixed assets such as land, and real estate whose value keeps rising from year to year. It seems the concept of upward revaluation of fixed assets such as real estate has not been widely welcomed by a majority of companies in USA on account of fear of paying higher property and capital gains taxes. Further, the provision against upward restatement ensures conservative valuation.

The United Kingdom, Australia, and India allow upward revaluation in the values of fixed assets to bring them in consonance with fair market values. However, the law requires disclosure of the basis of revaluation, amount of revaluation made to each class of assets (for a specified period after the financial year in which revaluation is made), and other information. Similarly, the law prohibits payment of dividend out of any reserve created as a result of the upward revaluation of fixed assets. The law in Australia has been amended recently to allow for the payment of dividends from the increase in the value of non-current assets in certain instances where a company meets other liquidity tests (see section 254T of the Corporations Act 2001 (Cth)).

=== Important points ===
- Increase in the value of fixed assets because of revaluation of fixed assets is credited to "Revaluation Reserve", and is not available for distribution as dividend. Revaluation Reserve is treated as a Capital Reserve.
- The increase in depreciation arising out of revaluation of fixed assets is debited to revaluation reserve and the normal depreciation to Profit and Loss account.
- Selection of the most suitable method of revaluation is extremely important. The most used method is the appraisal method. Methods such as indexation and reference to current market prices are also used. However, when these methods are used they are crosschecked with the values arrived at by using the appraisal method.
- When an asset is sold that has previously been revalued, the revaluation within the carrying value is debited to the Revaluation Reserve.
- When assets are revalued, every balance sheet shall show for a specified period of years, the amount of increase or decrease made in respect of each class of assets. Similarly, the increased/decreased value shall be shown in place of the original cost.
- In case of land and buildings, revaluation is desirable as their value generally increases over time, and is carried out every 3 to 5 years. In case of plant and machinery, revaluation is carried out only if there is a strong case for it. In case of depreciable assets such as vehicles, furniture and fittings or office equipment, revaluation is not carried out.
- Revaluation should not result in the net book value of an asset exceeding its recoverable value.

== Downward revaluation ==
Revaluation does not mean only an upward revision in the book values of the asset. It can also mean a downward revision (also called impairment) in the book values of the assets. However, any downward revision in the book values of the assets is immediately written off to the Profit and Loss account. Under IFRS, an asset is considered to be impaired (and is thus written down) if its carrying amount is greater than its recoverable amount. The recoverable amount is the greater of the asset's value in use (present value of future values) or net realizable value.

== Successive revaluations ==
An upward revaluation of a fixed asset which has been previously subject to downward revaluation, an amount of the upward revaluation equal to the amount previously expensed is credited back to the Profit and Loss Account.

Example:
Machinery 'A' is purchased on 01-04-1999 for $100,000. It is depreciated using the Straight Line Method at the rate of 10% p.a.

Particulars	First Revaluation	Second Revaluation
Nature of Revaluation	▼	▲
Date of Revaluation	01-04-2001	01-04-2004
Gross Cost	100,000	93,750
Less: Depreciation	20,000	46,875
Net Book Value	80,000	46,875
Revalued – Appraisal Method	75,000	55,000
Increase / (Decrease) in Net Book Value	(5,000)	8,125
Debit to Profit and Loss a/c	5,000	0
Credit to Profit and Loss a/c	0	5,000
Credit to Revaluation Reserve	0	3,125

== See also ==
- Capital appreciation
- Depreciation
- International Financial Reporting Standards
- Revaluation
- Write-off, write-down
