= IAS 1 =

International Accounting Standard 1: Presentation of Financial Statements or IAS 1 is an international financial reporting standard adopted by the International Accounting Standards Board (IASB). It lays out the guidelines for the presentation of financial statements and sets out minimum requirements of their content; it is applicable to all general purpose financial statements that are based on International Financial Reporting Standards (IFRS).

IAS 1 was originally issued by the International Accounting Standards Committee in 1997, superseding three standards on disclosure and presentation requirements, and was the first comprehensive accounting standard to deal with the presentation of financial standards. It was adopted by the IASB in 2001, and as of 2012 the standard was last amended in June 2011; these amendments are effective from July 1, 2012.

== Overview ==
=== Purpose and Features ===
IAS 1 sets out the purpose of financial statements as the provision of useful information on the financial position, financial performance and cash flows of an entity, and categorizes the information provided into assets, liabilities, income and expenses, contributions by and distribution to owners, and cash flows. It lists the set of statements, for example the statement of financial position and statement of profit and loss, that together comprise the financial statements.

IAS 1 also elaborates on the following features of the financial statements:

- fairly presented and compliant with IFRSs;
- prepared on a going concern basis;
- prepared using the accrual basis of accounting;
- has material classes presented separately;
- does not offset assets and liabilities;
- prepared at least annually;
- includes comparison with previous periods; and
- presented consistently across periods

=== Structure and Content ===
IAS 1 lists the line items that, as a minimum, are to be included. The standard lists requirements regarding the classification of information, such as requiring that current liabilities be listed separately, and details on when to classify a liability as current as opposed to non-current. It also sets out requirements regarding the notes to the financial statements, including disclosures on accounting policy and information on assumptions used.

== Recent amendments ==
IAS 1 was amended in 2007 to reflect a change in terminology that also affected other accounting standards. The changes include the following.

Term before amendment	Term after amendment
Balance sheet	Statement of financial position
Cash flow statement	Statement of cash flows
Income statement	Statement of comprehensive income

The IASB amended the statement again in 2011, adding the requirement that items in other comprehensive income be grouped based on their potential reclassifiability to profit and loss, among several other changes. These amendments, when previously proposed, led to the Institute of Chartered Accountants in England and Wales advising that the approach of making "small changes to one standard" can have negative effects.
