= Intangible asset =

Concept in accounting and economics

An intangible asset is an asset that lacks physical substance. Examples are patents, copyright, franchises, goodwill, trademarks, and trade names, reputation, R&D, know-how, organizational capital as well as any form of digital asset such as software and data. This is in contrast to physical assets (machinery, buildings, etc.) and financial assets (government securities, etc.).

Intangible assets are usually very difficult to value. Today, a large part of the corporate economy (in terms of net present value) consists of intangible assets, reflecting the growth of information technology (IT) and organizational capital. Specifically, each dollar of IT has been found to be associated with and increase in firm market valuation of over $10, compared with an increase of just over $1 per dollar of investment in other tangible assets. Furthermore, firms that both make organizational capital investments and have a large computer capital stock have disproportionately higher market valuations.

== Historial background ==
The concept of intangible assets can be traced back to economists such as Thorstein Veblen, who described them as non-physical forms of wealth whose value comes from the expected future earnings associated with owning them: "immaterial items of wealth, immaterial facts owned, valued, and capitalized on an appraisement of the gain to be derived from their possession".

In the 1960s, the concept of "intangible capital" began to emerge in economic thinking as a way of describing the productive value of knowledge, as reflected in Fritz Machlup's 1962 work The Production and Distribution of Knowledge in the United States. The publication of the OECD's Frascati Manual in 1963 also contributed to this development by providing a common framework for measuring and surveying research and development (R&D), treating it as an economic activity distinct from related scientific activities (RSA). The term later gained wider use in the economic literature through contributions from scholars such as Zvi Griliches in the 1980s, who used it to describe a firm's overall stock of knowledge, measured primarily through R&D and patents.

In practice, intangible assets were largely ignored and often viewed with suspicion by traditional accounting, which remained focused on tangible capital. By 1975, intangible assets represented only about 17% of the assets reported on the balance sheets of S&P 500 companies.

With the arrival of information technology age, economists began to realize that such changes were not fully reflected in traditional measures of economic growth and productivity. In 1987, Robert Solow famously observed: “we can see the computer revolution everywhere except in the productivity data”. This apparent contradiction was also reflected in the growing gap between the market value of technology companies and their value measured by traditional accounting. Such paradox led to a broader discussion about how economic growth should be measured including intangible assets.

As result, scholars such as Carol Corrado proposed three broad categories of intangible assets: 1) computerized information (e.g., software and databases), 2) innovative property (e.g., R&D, patents, copyright), and 3) economic competencies (e.g., brand equity, worker training, etc.).In the late 1990s, Leonard Nakamura showed that annual gross investment in intangible assets by U.S. companies had reached, or even exceeded, $1 trillion USD, putting it on a par with investment in physical assets. At the beginning of 2000s, Baruch Lev criticized the restrictive treatment of intangible assets under accounting rules and argued that they should be treated as assets capable of generating future benefits.

In 2005, Carol Corrado, Charles Hulten, and Daniel Sichel argued that spending on intangibles should be treated as investment because it is intended to increase future output. Building on Corrado's earlier categories, they developed a framework for measuring different types of intangible investment and their contribution to GDP growth, producing the first set of estimates for the United States.

Following the framework of Corrado, Hulten and Sichel, the United Kingdom and Japan established commissions to produce similar estimates for their own economies. The results for both countries were published in 2009 and, together with the U.S. estimates, were included in a 2010 special issue on intangible assets of the Review of Income and Wealth.

In parallel, international accounting standards began to incorporate intangible assets into their frameworks. Since the 1990s, the System of National Accounts (SNA), the European System of Accounts, and the UK National Accounts admitted software as investment. However, it was not until 2008 that the System of National Accounts revised its framework to recommend treating R&D as investment.

Organizations such as the World Intellectual Property Organization (WIPO) have found that, between 2008 and 2015, intangible investment grew more than three times as fast as tangible investment across the 29 economies covered by the Global INTAN-Invest database. In 2026, among the economies measured, the United States, Japan, and Germany recorded the highest levels of investment in intangible assets.

== Definition in accounting ==
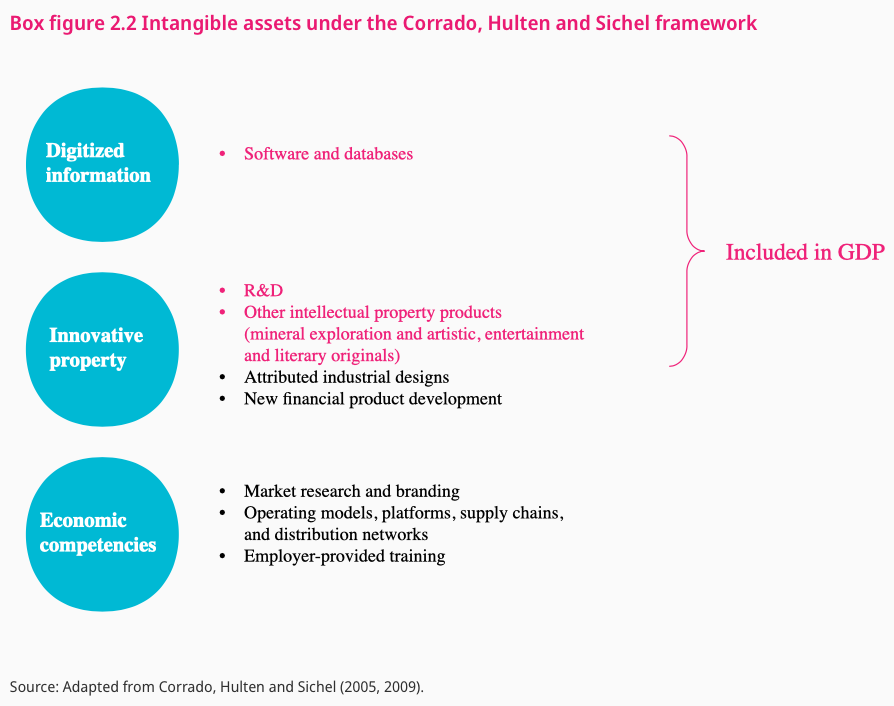
Intangible assets under the Corrado, Hultan and Sichel framework

Intangible assets may be one possible contributor to the disparity between "company value as per their accounting records", as well as "company value as per their market capitalization". Considering this argument, it is important to understand what an intangible asset truly is in the eyes of an accountant. A number of attempts have been made to define intangible assets:

- The Australian Accounting Standards Board included examples of intangible items in its definition of assets in Statement of Accounting Concepts number 4 (SAC 4), issued in 1995. The statement did not provide a formal definition of an intangible asset, but did explain that tangibility was not an essential characteristic of an asset.
- The International Accounting Standards Board (IASB) standard 38 (IAS 38) defines an intangible asset as: "an identifiable non-monetary asset without physical substance". This definition is in addition to the standard definition of an asset which requires a past event that has given rise to a resource that the entity controls and from which future economic benefits are expected to flow. Thus, the extra requirement for an intangible asset under IAS 38 is identifiability. This criterion requires that an intangible asset is separable from the entity or that it arises from a contractual or legal right.
- The Financial Accounting Standards Board Accounting Standard Codification 350 (ASC 350) defines an intangible asset as an asset, other than a financial asset, that lacks physical substance.

The lack of physical substance would therefore seem to be a defining characteristic of an intangible asset. Both the IASB and FASB definitions specifically preclude monetary assets in their definition of an intangible asset. This is necessary in order to avoid the classification of items such as accounts receivable, derivatives and cash in the bank as an intangible asset. IAS 38 contains examples of intangible assets, including: computer software, copyright and patents.

== Financial accounting ==
=== General standards ===
The IASB offers some guidance (IAS 38) as to how intangible assets should be accounted for in financial statements. In general, legal intangibles that are developed internally are not recognized and legal intangibles that are purchased from third parties are recognized. Wordings are similar to IAS 9.

Under US GAAP, intangible assets are classified into: Purchased vs. internally created intangibles, and Limited-life vs. indefinite-life intangibles.

=== Expense allocation ===
Intangible assets are typically expensed according to their respective life expectancy. Intangible assets have either an identifiable or an indefinite useful life. Intangible assets with identifiable useful lives are amortized on a straight-line basis over their economic or legal life, whichever is shorter. Examples of intangible assets with identifiable useful lives are copyrights and patents. Intangible assets with indefinite useful lives are reassessed each year for impairment. If an impairment has occurred, then a loss must be recognized. An impairment loss is determined by subtracting the asset's fair value from the asset's book/carrying value. Trademarks and goodwill are examples of intangible assets with indefinite useful lives. Goodwill has to be tested for impairment rather than amortized. If impaired, goodwill is reduced and loss is recognized in the Income statement.

=== Research and development ===
Research and development (known also as R&D) is considered to be an intangible asset (about 16 percent of all intangible assets in the US), even though most countries treat R&D as current expenses for both legal and tax purposes. Most countries report some intangibles in their National Income and Product Accounts (NIPA). The contribution of intangible assets in long-term GDP growth has been recognized by economists. Also of note, acquired "In-Process Research and Development" (IPR&D) is considered an asset under US GAAP.

IAS 38 requires any project that results in the generation of a resource to the entity be classified into two phases: a research phase, and a development phase.

The classification of research and development expenditure can be highly subjective and organizations may have ulterior motives in their classification of research and development expenditures.

=== Taxation ===
For personal income tax purposes, some costs with respect to intangible assets must be capitalized rather than treated as deductible expenses. Treasury regulations in the USA generally require capitalization of costs associated with acquiring, creating, or enhancing intangible assets. For example, an amount paid to obtain a trademark must be capitalized. Certain amounts paid to facilitate these transactions are also capitalized. Some types of intangible assets are categorized based on whether the asset is acquired from another party or created by the taxpayer. The regulations contain many provisions intended to make it easier to determine when capitalization is required.

Given the growing importance of intangible assets as a source of economic growth and tax revenue, and because their non-physical nature makes it easier for taxpayers to engage in tax strategies such as income-shifting or transfer pricing, tax authorities and international organizations have been designing ways to link intangible assets to the place where they were created, hence defining nexus. Intangibles for corporations are amortized over a 15-year period, equivalent to 180 months.

Definition of "intangibles" differs from standard accounting, in some US state governments. These governments may refer to stocks and bonds as "intangibles".

== Value of intangible assets ==
The most valuable firms, spanning high-tech, pharmaceutical, automotive and financial services industries, derive their competitiveness and market value from intangible rather than physical, that is to say, "tangible" capital. Among companies in the S&P 500, intangibles including intellectual property (IP) account for 90% of the total market value.

Intangible assets, though not always visible, play a crucial role in shaping the success of companies and countries in today's competitive environment. Investing in these assets helps businesses attract skilled talent, build customer loyalty, achieve market success, foster innovation and growth. These assets also contribute to improved economic opportunities, higher-paying jobs, enhanced product quality. According to WIPO's World IP Report (2017), IP and other intangibles contribute on average twice as much value as tangible capital to products manufactured and traded along value chains.

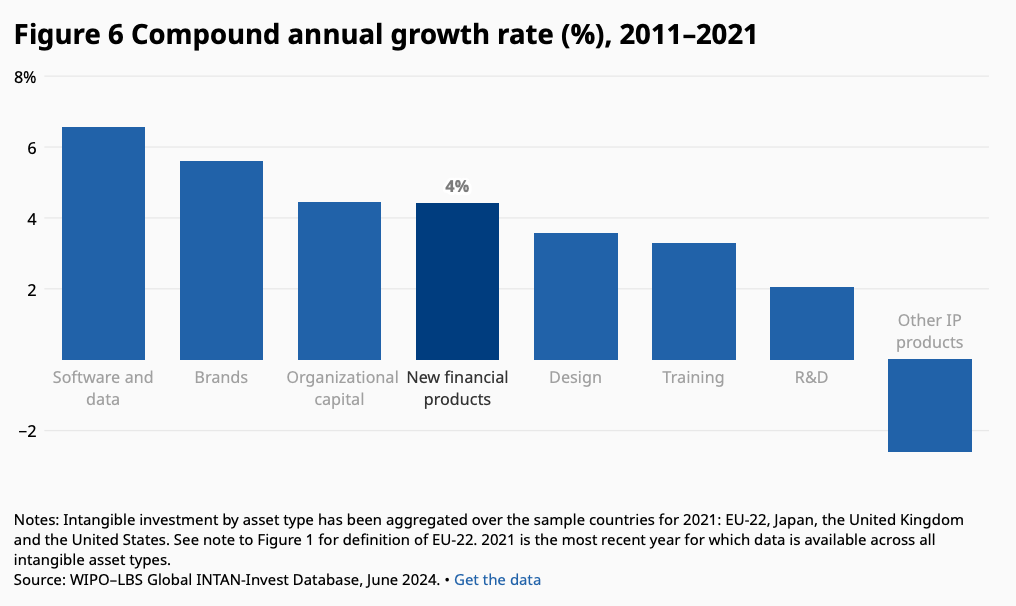
The fastest growing types of intangible asset over 2011–2021 have been software and data, followed by brands, organizational capital, and new financial products.

Recent estimates from Brand Finance used in the Global Innovation Index (GII) suggest that the global value of intangibles has been growing rapidly over the last 25 years to reach around USD 62 trillion in 2023.

In 2023, intangible investment accounted for over 16 percent of GDP in highly intangible-intensive economies like Sweden, the United States of America (US) and France. A trend showing intangible investment growing faster than tangible investment at country level. India was the country that experienced the fastest growth in intangible investment from 2011 to 2020.

According to World Intangible Investment Highlights 2026 from the World Intellectual Property Organization and LUISS Business School, in 2025 the intangible assets exceeded USD 10 trillion, which means a grown of 5.5 percent annually between 2020 and 2025, accounting for 57 percent of world GDP.

Software and data and brands are the two fastest growing types of intangible assets, both growing three times faster than R&D between 2011–2021.

Valuing intangible assets is nevertheless a challenge. There is no single methodology to value them. Depending on the type of asset at hand, context and data availability, often a combination of different approaches is used. In most cases, the value of intangibles can be estimated considering the future economic benefits associated with the asset, like projected cash flows. However, for many intangibles in practice this can be difficult. The cost to repurchase or recreate an asset or comparison with transactions involving similar assets are also common methods to determine value.

Intangible asset finance, also known as IP finance, is the branch of finance that uses intangible assets such as IP (legal intangible) and reputation (competitive intangible) to gain access to credit. Intangible assets can for example be used in equity finance. For example, many Swiss companies use equity finance to support their growth, particularly Venture capital. The information gathered through interviews indicates that a supportive IP portfolio, particularly when reinforced by robust patents, plays a crucial role as a contributing factor. Without these rights, investors are reluctant to engage with startups. In China, pledge-backed lending is the earliest type of IP financing developed and the fastest growing one. In 2022, the registered amount of patent and trademark pledged lending in China reached CNY 486.9 billion, up 57.1 percent year-on-year. Twenty-eight thousand projects from 26,000 chinese businesses received loans, both increasing about 65.5 percent year-on-year.

== See also ==
- Cognitive assets
- Intellectual capital
- Intellectual property
  - Brand
  - Copyright
  - Patent
  - Patent valuation
  - Trademark
  - Trade secret
- Goodwill (accounting)
- Organizational Capital
- Real assets
- Tangible common equity
- Tangible property
- Intangible asset finance
