= IAS 8 =

International financial reporting standard

== Overview and Scope ==
International Accounting Standard 8: Accounting Policies, Changes in Accounting Estimates and Errors (IAS 8) is an international financial reporting standard adopted by the International Accounting Standards Board (IASB). The standard prescribes the criteria for selecting and changing accounting policies, along with the accounting treatment and disclosure of changes in accounting estimates and corrections of prior period errors. IAS 8 is designed to enhance the relevance and reliability of an entity's financial statements and the comparability of those statements over time and with the financial statements of other entities.

== Accounting Policies ==
Accounting policies are the specific principles, bases, conventions, rules, and practices applied by an entity in preparing and presenting financial statements. When an IFRS specifically applies to a transaction, the accounting policy for that item must be determined by applying the relevant standard. In the absence of a specific IFRS, management must use judgment to develop a policy that results in relevant and reliable information. Such judgment should consider the requirements in IFRSs dealing with similar issues and the definitions and recognition criteria in the Conceptual Framework.

Changes in accounting policies are generally applied retrospectively by adjusting the opening balance of each affected component of equity for the earliest prior period presented. An entity shall change an accounting policy only if the change is required by an IFRS or results in the financial statements providing more reliable and relevant information.

== Changes in Accounting Estimates ==
A change in accounting estimate is an adjustment of the carrying amount of an asset or liability resulting from new information or developments. These changes are recognized prospectively by including them in profit or loss in the period of the change and future periods. Unlike accounting policies, changes in estimates do not require the restatement of prior periods because they do not relate to errors.

== Prior Period Errors ==
Prior period errors are omissions from, and misstatements in, an entity's financial statements for one or more prior periods. Material prior period errors must be corrected retrospectively in the first set of financial statements authorized for issue after their discovery. This involves restating the comparative amounts for the prior period(s) presented in which the error occurred.

== Booking Examples for IAS 8 ==
The following examples illustrate the difference between prospective and retrospective adjustments.

=== 1. Change in Accounting Estimate (Prospective) ===
IAS 8 requires prospective application: the new rate applies from the date of change without restating prior years.

Scenario: Cost: $100,000 (Jan 1, 2021) | Original Life: 10 years ($10k/yr) | Revision: On Jan 1, 2024, life reduced to 5 years total (2 years remaining).

Calculation: Carrying Amount (2024): $100,000 - $30,000 = $70,000. | New Depreciation: $70,000 / 2 years = $35,000/yr.

Journal Entry (Dec 31, 2024):

Account	Debit	Credit	Rationale
Depreciation Expense (P&L)	$35,000		Applied to remaining book value.
Accumulated Depreciation		$35,000	No restatement of 2021–2023.

=== 2. Correction of a Prior Period Error (Retrospective) ===
Scenario: In 2024, a company discovers it failed to record $50,000 of expenses in 2023.

Event	Debit	Credit	Rationale
Error Correction	Retained Earnings (Opening Balance)	Accrued Liabilities / Cash	The opening balance of equity is adjusted to reflect the error as if it had never occurred.
