= Accounting period =

Period for which accounts are prepared

An accounting period, in bookkeeping, is the period with reference to which management accounts and financial statements are prepared.

In management accounting the accounting period varies widely and is determined by management. Monthly accounting periods are common.

In financial accounting the accounting period is determined by regulation and is usually 12 months. The beginning of the accounting period differs according to jurisdiction. For example, one entity may follow the calendar year, January to December, while another may follow April to March as the accounting period.

The International Financial Reporting Standards allow a period of 52 weeks as an accounting period instead of 12 months. This method is known as the 4-4-5 calendar in British and Commonwealth usage and the 52–53-week fiscal year in the United States. In the United States the method is permitted by generally accepted accounting principles, as well as by US Internal Revenue Code Regulation 1.441-2 (IRS Publication 538).

In some of the ERP tools there are more than 12 accounting periods in a financial year. They put one accounting period as "Year Open" period where all the carried over balances from last financial year are cleared and one period as "Year Close" where all the transactions for closed for the same financial year. Older systems sometimes called these periods "Month 0" and "Month 13".

== 52–53-week fiscal year ==
The 52–53-week fiscal year (or 4–4–5 calendar) is used by companies that desire that their fiscal year always end on the same day of the week. Any day of the week may be used, and Saturday and Sunday are common because the business may more easily be closed for counting inventory and other end-of-year accounting activities. There are two methods in use:

=== Last Saturday of the month at fiscal year end ===
Under this method the company's fiscal year is defined as the final Saturday (or other day selected) in the fiscal year end month. For example, if the fiscal year end month is August, the company's year end could fall on any date from August 25 to August 31. Currently it would end on the following days:

  2006-08-26   2006 August 26
  2007-08-25   2007 August 25
  2008-08-30   2008 August 30  (leap year)
  2009-08-29   2009 August 29
  2010-08-28   2010 August 28
  2011-08-27   2011 August 27
  2012-08-25   2012 August 25  (leap year)
  2013-08-31   2013 August 31
  2014-08-30   2014 August 30
  2015-08-29   2015 August 29
  2016-08-27   2016 August 27  (leap year)
  2017-08-26   2017 August 26
  2018-08-25   2018 August 25
  2019-08-31   2019 August 31

The end of the fiscal year would move one day earlier on the calendar each year (two days in leap years) until it would otherwise reach the date seven days before the end of the month (August 24 in this case). At that point it resets to the end of the month (August 31) and the fiscal year has 53 weeks instead of 52. In this example the fiscal years ending in 2008, 2013, and 2019 have 53 weeks.

=== Saturday nearest the end of month ===
Under this method the company's fiscal year is defined as the Saturday (or other day selected) that falls closest to the last day of the fiscal year end month. For example, if the fiscal year end month is August, the company's year end could fall on any date from August 28 to September 3. Currently it would end on the following days:

  2006-09-02   2006 September 2
  2007-09-01   2007 September 1
  2008-08-30   2008 August 30    (leap year)
  2009-08-29   2009 August 29
  2010-08-28   2010 August 28
  2011-09-03   2011 September 3
  2012-09-01   2012 September 1  (leap year)
  2013-08-31   2013 August 31
  2014-08-30   2014 August 30
  2015-08-29   2015 August 29
  2016-09-03   2016 September 3  (leap year)
  2017-09-02   2017 September 2
  2018-09-01   2018 September 1
  2019-08-31   2019 August 31

The end of the fiscal year would move one day earlier on the calendar each year (two days in leap years) until it would otherwise reach the date four days before the end of the month (August 27 in this case). At that point the first Saturday in the following month (September 3 in this case) becomes the date closest to the end of August and it resets to that date and the fiscal year has 53 weeks instead of 52. In this example the fiscal years ending in 2011 and 2016 have 53 weeks.

The 52–53 week method is permitted by generally accepted accounting principles in the United States, by US Internal Revenue Code Regulation 1.441-2 (IRS Publication 538)., as well as the International Financial Reporting Standards.
