= Financial Accounting Standards Board =

Private US organization for accounting

- Founded: 1972 (Operational in 1973)
- Location: Norwalk, Connecticut
- Key people: Richard R. Jones (Chairman); Hillary H. Salo (Vice Chair)
- Website: fasb.org

The Financial Accounting Standards Board (FASB) is a private standard-setting body whose primary purpose is to establish and improve Generally Accepted Accounting Principles (GAAP) within the United States in the public's interest. The U.S. Securities and Exchange Commission (SEC) designated the FASB as the organization responsible for setting accounting standards for public companies in the U.S. The FASB replaced the American Institute of Certified Public Accountants' (AICPA) Accounting Principles Board (APB) on July 1, 1973. The FASB is run by the nonprofit Financial Accounting Foundation.

FASB accounting standards are accepted as authoritative by many organizations, including state Boards of Accountancy and the American Institute of CPAs (AICPA).

== Structure ==
The FASB is based in Norwalk, Connecticut, and is led by seven full-time Board members, including the chairman, who are appointed by the Financial Accounting Foundation (FAF) to serve five-year terms and are eligible for one term of reappointment.

The qualifications to serve on the FASB include professional competence and realistic experience from professions like financial reporting, investment services, and financial planning. Board members also come from sectors such as academia, business, and legal, or government agencies.

FASB board members, as of February 22, 2023:

Member	Term Expiration
Richard R. Jones, Chairman	1st term expires in 2027
James Kroeker, Vice Chairman	2nd term expired in 2024
Christine Botosan	2nd term expires in 2026
Marsha Hunt	2nd term expires in 2027
Susan Cosper	1st term expired in 2024
Frederick Cannon	1st term expires in 2026
Gary Buesser	1st term expired in 2023

The board is supported by more than 60 staff.

In December 2019, FAF board of trustees announced that Richard Jones would succeed Russell Golden as FASB's chair when his term expired at the end of June 2020.

=== Oversight ===
The FASB is subject to oversight by the Financial Accounting Foundation (FAF), which selects the members of the FASB and the Governmental Accounting Standards Board and funds both organizations. The Board of Trustees of the FAF is selected by a nomination process that involves several organizations from investing, accounting, business, financial, and governmental sectors, but are ultimately selected by the existing Board. The selection process was amended as such in 2008 to reduce private sector influence on the Board of Trustees and its oversight of the FASB and GASB.

== History ==
=== Inception ===
Marshall Armstrong, then-president of the American Institute of Certified Public Accountants (AICPA), appointed a group of seven men (collectively called the Wheat Committee after its head Francis Wheat) in 1971 to examine the organization and operation of the Accounting Principles Board, in order to determine what adjustments were needed to facilitate more accurate and timely results and avoid governmental rule-making. Their findings, "Report of the Study on the Establishment of Accounting Principles", were published in March 1972, and proposed several changes including establishing the Financial Accounting Foundation, separate from other professional firms, that would be overseen by the Board of Trustees. The FASB was conceived as a full-time body to ensure that Board member deliberations encourage broad participation, objectively consider all stakeholder views, and are not influenced or directed by political/private interests. The Wheat Report also recommended developing the Financial Accounting Standards Advisory Council, a 20-member advisory council that members serve an initial 1-year term, that could be renewed indefinitely, and to explicitly define the FASB research projects, to ensure timely and appropriate results.

The U.S Securities and Exchange Commission (SEC) issued Accounting Series Release No. 150 (ASR 150), which states that FASB pronouncements will be considered by the SEC as having "substantial authoritative support", in 1973. That same year, the FASB issued its first standard, Statement of Financial Accounting Standards No. 1: Disclosure of Foreign Currency Translation Information.

=== Conceptual Framework ===
The FASB Conceptual Framework was established in 1973 as a comprehensible set of standards and rules intended to address and solve new emerging issues. The conceptual framework underlaid financial accounting by serving as the Board's reasoning behind its standards-setting decisions.

The conceptual framework provides two functions: to state the objectives of financial reporting and provide definitions of financial statement elements. The conceptual framework creates a foundation for financial accounting and establishes consistent standards that highlight the nature, function, and limitations of financial reporting.

=== Emerging Issues Task Force ===
The FASB formed the Emerging Issues Task Force (EITF) in 1984. It was formed to provide timely responses to financial issues as they emerged. The group includes 15 people from both the private and public sectors coupled with representatives from the FASB and an SEC observer. As issues emerge, the task force considers them and tries to reach a consensus on what course of action to take. From conception until the 2003 AICPA GAAP Agreement, if consensus was reached on a topic, the group would issue an EITF Issue that was considered equivalent to a FASB pronouncement and included in GAAP.

=== International standard setting comparability ===
The FASB participated in an international conference on global accounting standards in 1991, The Objectives and Concepts Underlying Financial Reporting, co-sponsored by the International Accounting Standards Committee and the Fédération des Experts Comptables Européens.

Two years later, the FASB participated in the formation of the G4+1, a group of international standard setters. Its members included the United States, Australia, the United Kingdom, Canada, and New Zealand. In August 1994 the group released a special report, Future Events: A Conceptual Study of their Significance for Recognition and Measurement.

In 1999, the FASB issued International Accounting Standard Setting: A Vision for the Future, a report which acknowledged the rapid changes taking place in the international accounting standard setting environment, and that convergence and development of high-quality international standards are coinciding goals.

=== Norwalk Agreement ===
In 2002, the FASB began to work on a convergence project in partnership with the International Accounting Standards Board (IASB), the independent accounting standard-setting body of the International Financial Reporting Standards Foundation. The two groups met on September 18, 2002, in Norwalk, Connecticut, to sign a Memorandum of Understanding (MoU) which "committed the boards to developing high-quality, compatible accounting standards with a common solution".

This MoU, which came to be known as the Norwalk Agreement, outlined plans to converge IFRS and U.S. GAAP into one set of high quality and compatible standards. For ten years the FASB and IASB collaborated on a common objective not only to eliminate differences between IFRS and U.S. GAAP wherever possible, "but also to achieve convergence in accounting standards that stood the test of time".

=== Sarbanes-Oxley Act of 2002 ===
The Sarbanes–Oxley Act of 2002 was signed into law on July 30, 2002, to protect stakeholders and investors by improving the dependability and precision of corporate financial disclosures. The legislation also created the Public Company Accounting Oversight Board (PCAOB), and included accounting support fees from issuers of securities to FASB.

=== AICPA's GAAP agreement ===
In November 2002, FASB Chairman Robert Herz announced that FASB and AICPA came to the agreement that the AICPA would no longer issue Statements of Positions (SOPs) that are considered authoritative GAAP. They also concluded that consensus of the EITF will be required to be ratified by the FASB to become authoritative GAAP.

=== Investor Task Force ===
The FASB established the Investor Task Force (ITF) in 2005, which was an advisory resource that provided the Board with sector expertise and specific insights from the professional investment community on relevant accounting issues. The FASB then implemented SFAS 157 which established new standards for disclosure regarding fair value measurements in financial statements in 2006. That same year, the FASB added Investor Liaisons to its staff, who would be responsible for reaching out to investors to hear feedback on the various FASB activities.

=== Financial Crisis Advisory Group (FCAG) ===
The FASB and the International Accounting Standards Board created the Financial Crisis Advisory Group in 2008—an international group of standard-setting bodies—that coordinated responses "on the future of global standards in light of" the 2008 financial crisis. The FCAG was composed of 15–20 senior leaders in finance and chaired by Harvey Goldschmid and Hans Hoogervorst with a mandate to investigate financial reporting issues uncovered by the 2008 financial crisis. FCAG members included Stephen Haddrill and Michel Prada—a member of the International Centre for Financial Regulation (ICFR) and co-chair of the Council on Global Financial Regulation was a member of the Financial Crisis Advisory Group. Haddrill who was the only UK representative on the FCAG, is CEO of the Financial Reporting Council (FRC) in the United Kingdom and has a close interest in accounting standards.

The FCAG issued a report in July 2009 finding, among other things, that the FASB and SEC had been pressured by politicians and banks to change accounting standards to protect banks from the impact of their toxic mortgages. Just prior to the report to the G20, and in reference to the political pressure placed on standards setters "to make changes to fair value accounting rules over suggestions that it exacerbated the financial crisis" Haddrill cautioned, "Who do we want to set accounting standards? Not politicians, that's clear. But neither do we want experts vacuum-packed in a world of their own."

=== Accounting Standards Codification ===
On July 1, 2009, the FASB announced the launch of its Accounting Standards Codification, an online research system representing the single source of authoritative nongovernmental U.S. GAAP, available from the FASB in multiple views; Professional view, Academic view, and Basic view. The Codification organizes the pronouncements that constitute U.S. GAAP into a consistent, searchable format. The Codification is not to be confused with the FASB's 1973 Conceptual Framework project.

=== Convergence to international comparability ===
In 2010, the SEC instructed the staff to create and implement a work plan that addresses whether, when and how U.S. GAAP should be merged into a global reporting model developed by International Accounting Standards Board (IASB)—the standards setting body designated by the International Financial Reporting Standards (IFRS). The SEC staff research included including convergence with IFRS and an alternate IFRS endorsement mechanism.

In the resulting 2012 report, the SEC Staff asserted that the IFRS standards were not sufficiently supported by U.S. capital market participants and lacked consistent implementation methods. The report goes on to say that, while the U.S. financial reporting community does not support IFRS as the authoritative mechanism for US financial reporting, there is support for "high-quality, globally accepted accounting standards" as demonstrated in the joint efforts of the IASB and FASB to develop converged financial reporting for revenue recognition and lease accounting.

The FASB and the IASB issued guidance on recognizing revenue in contracts with customers in 2014, establishing principles to report useful information to users of financial statements about the nature, timing, and uncertainty of revenue from these transactions. In May 2015 the SEC acknowledged that "investors, auditors, regulators and standard-setters" in the United States did not support mandating International Financial Reporting Standards Foundation (IFRS) for all U.S. public companies. There was "little support for the SEC to provide an option allowing U.S. companies to prepare their financial statements under IFRS". However, there was support for a single set of globally accepted accounting standards. The FASB and IASB planned meetings in 2015 to discuss "business combinations, the disclosure framework, insurance contracts and the conceptual framework". As of 2017, there were no active bilateral FASB/IASB projects underway. Instead, the FASB participates in the Accounting Standards Advisory Forum, a global grouping of standard-setters, and monitors individual projects to seek comparability.

== Accounting standards ==
=== Credit losses ===
On June 16, 2016, the FASB issued an ASU that improves financial reporting by requiring timelier recording of credit losses on loans and other financial instruments held by financial institutions and other organizations. The ASU also amends the accounting for credit losses on available-for-sale debt securities and purchased financial assets with credit deterioration, and requires enhanced disclosures to help investors and other financial statement users better understand significant estimates and judgments used in estimating credit losses, as well as the credit quality and underwriting standards of an organization's portfolio.

=== Variable interest entities ===
Under the new standard, the decision whether to consolidate is determined by two factors: a company's design and intention and a parent company's ability to direct that organization's actions in a way that significantly impacts its economic performance.

=== Pensions ===
In late 2006, the FASB issued Employers' Accounting for Defined Benefit Pension and Other Postretirement Plans (statement 158). Under this update, if a pension or other post-retirement plan is overfunded, a company must recognize that overfunded amount as an asset, which can be reduced later if the plan becomes underfunded. Conversely, if a plan is underfunded, a company must recognize that underfunded amount as a liability, which can be reduced if a plan's funding increases in a period. These asset or liability determinations are recognized at the employer's year end in the same year that the plan funding takes place.

These enhancements were made in order to provide employees, investors, retirees, and users of financial statements more complete information about the status of a pension or other post-retirement plan, which is used to make informed decisions about organizations capabilities to fulfill plan obligations.

=== Stock options ===
The FASB issued a statement on Share Based Payments (statement 123(R)) in 2004, developed jointly with the IASB. This standard update requires companies to identify the cost of share-based payments (e.g., restricted share plans, employee share purchase plans, performance-based awards, share appreciation rights, and stock options) within their financials. The FASB updated this reporting standard with the goal of improving comparability, relevance and reliability of financial information.

=== Leases (balance sheet) ===
In February 2016, the FASB issued a new Leases standard, to improve financial reporting about leasing transactions. The new standard requires organizations to include lease obligations on their balance sheets, and affects all companies and other organizations that lease assets.

=== Derivative accounting ===
Upon electing to use hedge accounting, companies must establish a method to evaluate the effectiveness of hedging a derivative, and a method to determine the ineffectiveness of a hedge. The FASB further improved derivative accounting in 2017 with simplification measures included in ASU 2017–12.

== Criticism ==
=== Mark-to-market ===
Critics argue that the 2006 SFAS 157 contributed to the 2008 financial crisis by easing the mark-to-market accounting rule and allowing valuation of assets based on their current market price, rather than the purchase price. Critics claim FASB changes to mark-to-market accounting were made to accommodate "banks with toxic assets on their books".

However, others from within the accounting profession assert that the mark-to-market system in fact provides greater transparency and stability by applying similar values to similar assets, regardless of whether they were bought or created internally by a firm. They contrast this with the alternate "mark-to-model" system—said to be riskier, less transparent, and results in incomparable and inconsistent reporting.

Others say mark-to-market provides the most practical choice when valuing most assets, if there is understanding of the long-term effects, and obligation to a global position. They counter that the banking issues went beyond failures in accounting and into major liquidity concerns, and that the accounting profession, FASB, and SEC were not responsible for the banking crisis.

A report from the Harvard Business Review agreed that the mark-to-market accounting is not the direct cause of the financial crisis, but the lack of knowledge related to accounting standards by investors fueled the fire. Most investors at the time assumed that all of banks' assets were appraised at market prices, and that the writing down of bonds would cause banks to violate regulatory capital requirements.

=== Materiality ===
The FASB issued a proposal regarding "the use of materiality by reporting entities" in an amendment of the definition of the legal concept of materiality in 2015, stating that "information would be considered material if it was likely to be seen by a reasonable person as significantly altering the total mix of facts about a company." This amendment raised concerns by auditors who believed leaving materiality as a legal concept would undermine judgments made by preparers and auditors to an attorney.

=== International comparability vs. convergence ===
Some industry professionals support development of a single, globally-shared set of accounting standards. Convergence proponents assert that a single set of standards would make it easier and more cost-effective for large multi-national corporations to report using one set of financial reporting standards for all countries. They believe it would make financial statements more comparable to one another, improving overall transparency and understanding of a company's financial health. Supporters also argue that a single set of standards would give investors access to crucial information more quickly and increase opportunities for international investments, resulting in economic growth.

Other professionals, however, are opposed to wholesale convergence of a single set of international accounting standards. Opponents share concerns that, due to different environmental influences around the world, such as differing stages of economic development and sources of funding, independent accounting standards are appropriate and necessary.

Convergence opponents have said that without vision and commitment to convergence, the standards wouldn't be effective unless they were enforced or provide significant benefits.

Many U.S. accounting firms are opposed to convergence because of the familiarity of GAAP, the unfamiliarity with international accounting principles, and other countries' accounting systems. U.S. firms and other CPAs have been reluctant to adapt and learn a new accounting system, and believe that IFRS lacks guidance compared to the GAAP. CFOs are also against converging to one set of standards, because of the associated cost.

== See also ==
- FASB 133
- FIN46
- Fin 48
- List of FASB pronouncements

=== FASB 11 concepts ===
- Money measurement
- Entity
- Going concern
- Cost
- Dual aspect
- Accounting period
- Conservation
- Realization
- Matching
- Consistency
- Materiality

=== Accounting issues ===
- Stock option expensing
- ASC 820
- Mark-to-market or fair value accounting

=== Related associations ===
- Financial Accounting Foundation
- Governmental Accounting Standards Board
