= Transparency (market) =

Economic concept

In economics, a market is transparent if much is known by many about what products and services or capital assets are available, market depth (quantity available), what price, and where. Transparency is important since it is one of the theoretical conditions required for a free market to be efficient. Price transparency can, however, lead to higher prices. For example, if it makes sellers reluctant to give steep discounts to certain buyers (e.g. disrupting price dispersion among buyers), or if it facilitates collusion, and price volatility is another concern. A high degree of market transparency can result in disintermediation due to the buyer's increased knowledge of supply pricing.

There are two types of price transparency: 1) I know what price will be charged to me, and 2) I know what price will be charged to you. The two types of price transparency have different implications for differential pricing. A transparent market should also provide necessary information about quality and other product features, although quality can be exceedingly difficult to estimate for some goods, such as artworks.

While the stock market is relatively transparent, hedge funds are notoriously secretive. Researchers in this area have found concerns by hedge funds about the crowding out of their trades through transparency and undesirable effects of incomplete transparency. Some financial professionals, including Wall Street veteran Jeremy Frommer are pioneering the application of transparency to hedge funds by broadcasting live from trading desks and posting detailed portfolios online.

In the United States, the goal of the Corporate Transparency Act (CTA) is to foster greater transparency in business ownership within the United States. By mandating companies to disclose their beneficial owners to the Financial Crimes Enforcement Network (FinCEN), the CTA aims to curb illicit financial activities such as money laundering and terrorist financing. This requirement seeks to enhance accountability and deter the misuse of anonymous shell corporations for unlawful purposes. Ultimately, the CTA seeks to promote integrity in corporate governance and bolster confidence in the U.S. financial system by ensuring that the true individuals behind corporate entities are known and accountable.

== Critical transparency ==
There is a rich literature in accounting that takes a critical perspective to market transparency, focusing on the nuances and boundaries. For example, some researchers question its utility (e.g. Etzioni). This also connects to the performativity of quantitative models or "reactivity". Specific cases include transparency in the art market. There are also studies from finance that note concerns with market transparency, such as perverse effects including decreased market liquidity and increased price volatility. This is one motivation for markets that are selectively transparent, such as "dark pools".

Dynamics of transparency may also differ between investment markets, cambist markets where goods trade without being used up, and other types of markets, e.g. goods and services.

In fair value accounting (FVA), transparency may be complicated by the fact that level 2 and 3 assets cannot strictly be marked-to-market, given that no direct market exists, creating questions about what transparency means for these assets. Level 2 assets may be marked-to-model, a topic of interest in the social studies of finance, while Level 3 assets may require inputs including management expectations or assumptions.

== In the Forex market ==
There are few markets that require the level of privacy, honesty, and trust between its participants as the Forex (FX) market. This creates great obstacles for traders, investors, and institutions to overcome as there is a lack of transparency, leading to the need to develop trust with trading partners and developing these relationships through social means, such as "gifts of information", which is even seen on the trading floors of global investment banks that service institutional investors.

With little to no transparency, trader's ability to verify transactions becomes virtually impossible, at least if one does not have faith that the market exchange is operating in a well-run fashion, a problem that is unlikely with the major brokerage services open to institutional investors (e.g. Reuters, Bloomberg, and Telerate). In a situation with a problematic market exchange lacking transparency, there would be no trust between the client and the broker, yet surprisingly, there is nonetheless demand to trade in dark pools. This has also become an area of financial innovation.

Forex markets are now also a target for new blockchain innovations, which would allow trading outside of centralized exchanges or change the way these exchanges operate.

== See also ==
- Competition regulator
- Consumer organization
- Consumer protection
- Efficient market
- Extractive Industries Transparency Initiative (or EITI)
- Information
- International Sugar Organization
- Market anomaly
- Shell corporation
- Transfer pricing
- Transparency (trade)
- Transparency (behavior)
- Underground economy
- Valuation (finance)
