= Accounting and the late 2000s financial crisis =

Accounting and the late 2000s financial crisis are the accounting methods that contributed to the 2008 financial crisis. There were many differing views on which parties were primarily responsible for the crisis. These include investment bankers, credit rating agencies, financial statement preparers, the US Federal Reserve, investors, loan originators, auditors, and borrowers among others. One of the parties identified was the role that accountants and specific accounting standards played in the crisis.

The Causes of the Great Recession and "History of Fair Value Issues" provide more details of the specific causes. The key accounting issues were fair value accounting and the role of auditors.

== Fair Value Accounting and its Role in the 2008 financial crisis ==
The role of fair value accounting in the subprime mortgage crisis of 2008 is controversial. Fair value accounting was issued as US accounting standard SFAS 157 in 2006 by the privately run Financial Accounting Standards Board (FASB)—delegated by the SEC with the task of establishing financial reporting standards. This required that tradable assets such as mortgage securities be valued according to their current market value rather than their historic cost or some future expected value. When the market for such securities became volatile and collapsed, the resulting loss of value had a major financial effect upon the institutions holding them even if they had no immediate plans to sell them.

=== Financial Accounting Standard 157 ===
In 2006 the Financial Accounting Standards (FASB) implemented FAS 157 in order to establish a generally accepted accounting definition of fair value, methods for measuring fair value, and to expand disclosures about fair value measurements in financial statements. The statement aimed to increase consistency, comparability and transparency among statements that incorporated fair-value measurements. FAS 157 defines a hierarchy of three levels of inputs to obtain the fair value of an asset or liability.

These levels are classified as Level 1, Level 2 or Level 3. These levels differ in that Level 1 inputs have active markets, Level 2 inputs use models for similar assets, and Level 3 inputs are unobservable, relying on model assumptions. Since Level 2 and Level 3 inputs do not have active markets with identical assets, the discretion of management is required when determining the fair value of these assets. This provides room for managerial manipulation.

=== How Fair-Value Accounting Came into Being ===
1. Lessons from 1929 Stock Crash Under historical cost accounting, profits came to be calculated as the difference between the income accrued and costs incurred, according to revenue recognition and matching principal. This traditional measure of the profits did not prove adequate to value derivatives. In some cases, historical cost accounting didn't apply because there was little trading cost, (e.g. an interest-rate swap contract). And in other cases, because of the existence of fairly liquid markets and the wide use of valuation methodologies in financial markets to set asset prices, the relevance of historical cost accounting is largely undermined. In order to improve information transparency, and to better inform investors about the interest and credit risks reflected, FASB began take steps to extend the application of the fair value principle to an ever greater range of assets and liabilities.

2.The Expanding Use of Derivatives In the 1980s, derivatives underwent significant development as they came to be used to hedge against interest and exchange rate risks. Additionally, derivatives started to be used by credit institutions as a new source of business. The large-scale use of derivatives by large and medium-sized corporations, together with the ever growing importance of capital markets, has led to major changes in the traditional practices used to prepare financial statements.

US Savings and Loan Crisis and Fair-Value Accounting
In the late 1980s and early 1990s, the Savings and Loan Crisis precipitated a collapse of the U.S. thrift industry. Investors demanded increased transparency, and historical cost accounting was blamed for creating rooms for banks to underestimate their losses. In 1991, the Government Accounting Office (GAO) issued a report that urged immediate adoption for both GAAP and regulatory reporting of mark-to-market accounting for all debt securities. It also suggested that a study be undertaken of the potential merits of a comprehensive market-value-based reporting system for banks.
As fair value was increasingly viewed as an important tool for valuation, a clear guidance was needed for better application. In 2006, FASB issued FAS 157, which provided a uniform definition of “fair value” and guidance for application.

=== Fair Value Accounting in Practice ===
Banks’ asset categories are mostly made up of loans and leases, available-for-sale and held-to-maturity securities, and trading assets. Loans and leases comprise the biggest and most important category for most banks. These assets are classified as either “held-for-investment,” or “held-for-sale”, accounted for at the lower of historical cost or fair value. Ultimately, most of the assets held by financial institutions were either not subject to fair value, or did not impact the income statement or balance sheet accounts. However, a large minority of the assets were “held-for-sale” or trading assets. The loans and securities in the held-for-sale classification are tested for impairment and, if impaired, written down to the present value of future cash flows. Loans are usually impaired because creditors will be unable to collect all amounts due but if classified as “held-for-sale” can also be deemed impaired under FAS157 if their market value falls for an extended period of time.

Furthermore, all derivatives are treated as trading assets and are marked to market. However, as the crisis evolved and liquidity deteriorated, fair value assets held by banks increasingly became Level 3 inputs because their market prices became unobservable.

As mentioned in the 2010 article written by Laux and Leuz, linking banking capital regulation and fair value accounting is the most plausible way fair value accounting could have contributed to the crisis: Asset prices deviate from their fundamental values, which causes a bank to write down its assets and, in turn, depletes its capital. Consequently, the asset write-downs may force the bank to sell such assets at fire sale prices and start a downward spiral. This causes a contagion problem and forces other banks to take similar write-downs. However, according to Laux and Leuz, this is not what typically happens in banks’ practices.

=== The Link between Fair Value and Crises ===
As mentioned in the article written by Laux and Leuz, linking banking capital regulation and fair value accounting is the most plausible way fair value accounting could have contributed to the crisis. The explanation that links the two subjects is that asset values deviate from their fundamental market prices, which causes a bank to write down its assets and, in turn, deplete its capital. Consequently, the asset write-downs may force the bank to sell such assets at fire sale prices and start a downward spiral. This causes a contagion problem and forces other banks to take similar write-downs. However, according to Laux and Leuz, this is not what typically happens in banks' practices.

=== Fair Value Accounting in Practice ===
In practice, Banks' asset categories include loans and leases, available-for-sale and held-to-maturity securities, and trading assets. Loans and leases, however, comprise the biggest and most important category for banks. These assets are classified as either "held-for-investment," which is typically a small percent of the loans, or "held-for-sale", accounted for at the lower of historical cost or fair value. The loans and leases in the held-for-sale classification are tested for impairment and, if impaired, written down to the present value of future cash flows. Loans are usually impaired because creditors will be unable to collect all amounts due.

This was a reoccurring problem in the 2008 financial crisis. Since the crisis unfolded, fair value assets held by banks increasingly became Level 3 inputs (unobservable). Ultimately, most of the assets held by financial institutions were either not subject to fair value, or did not impact the income statement or balance sheet accounts.

=== Fair value as a Contributor ===
There has been debate on whether fair value accounting contributed to the crisis or simply was the messenger of the crisis. The opponents of fair value believe it is the contributor to the crisis. Opponents, such as FDIC chairman William Isaac and House Speaker Newt Gingrich, lobbied and urged for the suspension of mark-to-market accounting. Clearly, the lobbying has been an issue of debate as well – one that proponents are not pleased with, as lobbying the FASB presents an issue of its independence. These people believe fair value accounting is not the most relevant method of measuring financial instruments.

Steve Forbes is another opponent who believes fair value accounting was the "principal reason" for the 2008 financial crisis. One argument is that a majority of structured debt, corporate bonds and mortgages were still performing, but their prices had fallen below their true value due to frozen markets (contagion explained above). Opponents also state that fair value accounting undermines critical foundations of financial reporting, including verifiability, reliability and conservatism. It is argued that fair value accounting lacks all three attributes. Some opponents may even suggest that historical cost accounting is more accurate by arguing that financial institutions are forced to record any permanent impairment in the market value of their assets.

Brian Wesbury, Chief Economist, and Robert Stein, Senior Economist at First Trust Advisors in their “Economic Commentary” claimed that “It is true that the root of this crisis is bad mortgage loans, but probably 70% of the real crisis that we face today is caused by mark-to-market accounting in an illiquid market".

=== Fair Value as a Messenger ===
On the other hand, proponents for fair value accounting believe that fair value was not the cause of the crisis. Instead, they suggest fair value only communicated the effects of poor decisions, such as subprime loans. Proponents also believe that fair value accounting provides investors with critical transparency of companies. There are empirical foundations that prove fair value accounting to be the better indicator of value when compared to historical cost. The lack of transparency by using historical cost accounting may make matter worse. It is possible the market reacts more extremely if the fair-value or current market prices are not disclosed. There is no empirical evidence that using historical cost accounting will calm the investors.

As with any standard setting body, the FASB was faced with tradeoffs when it made the decision to implement this new standard. Since this is an imperfect world with information problems, it is difficult to know what the absolute best option is. This is why it is important that the FASB, along with all other participants in the financial environment, become knowledgeable in their fields, and assess how their decisions and performance may affect others. This stands true for auditors and their role in the financial markets and crisis.

Proponents argue that fair value accounting provides a clear measurement of the underlying value of assets. They state that the subprime crisis was not caused by accounting, but by bad operating of firms, investors and sometimes by fraud. It is unfair to blame the fair value accounting that is merely a reflection of the actual problem. “Fair value accounting…is a fundamental mechanism to provide investors with important transparency…. The roots of today’s crisis have many causes, but fair value accounting is not one of them.”
--Scott Evans, Executive Vice President, Asset Management at TIAA-CREF at October 2008 SEC roundtable on mark-to-market accounting (pg. 17)

“Death spiral”, contagion and systemic risk
Banks are required to maintain “adequate capital” to comply with regulatory requirements. The capital ratios are the percentage of bank’s capital to its risk-weighted assets and total assets. Adequately capitalized banks are required to have Tier 1 capital and total capital not lower than set percentages of the banks' risk-weighted assets and total assets. These calculations are defined by the Basel Accords as implemented by each country's banking regulators. At the beginning of the crisis, the values of mortgage-backed assets started to fall, and firms holding mortgage-backed assets had to write those assets down to market value, the bank’s regulatory capital went down. Under their regulatory capital requirements, banks were forced to sell mortgage-backed assets for cash to reduce “risk adjusted assets”. Some firms also sold because of a fear that prices would decline further. The fire sale created an excess supply which further drove down the market price of mortgage-backed assets and the regulatory capital of banks continued to decline. This phenomenon is referred to as the “death spiral”.

Moreover, death spiral can lead to “financial contagion”. If fire-sale prices from a distressed bank become relevant marks for other banks, mark-to-market accounting can cause write-downs and regulatory capital problems for otherwise sound banks (Cifuentes, Ferrucci, and Shin, 2005; Allen and Carletti, 2008; Heaton, Lucas, and McDonald, 2009). This is considered to be systemic risk in the banking industry.

As with any standard setting body, the FASB was faced with tradeoffs when it made the decision to implement this new standard. Since this is an imperfect world with information problems, it is difficult to know what the absolute best option is. This is why it is important that the FASB, along with all other participants in the financial environment, become knowledgeable in their fields, and assess how their decisions and performance may affect others. This stands true for auditors and their role in the financial markets and crisis.

=== Looking Forward: the Potential of Double-Presentation ===
To strike the balance between reliability and relevance, some scholars propose a double-disclosure—fair-value measurement backed up by historical cost figures: "The best way to ensure that regulators, investors, and the market at large have a full understanding of banks’ true financial conditions is to include changes in the value of financial instruments over time in financial statements, along with historical cost figures."
In fact, FASB is not planning to abandon historical cost accounting for financial instruments held for collection or payment of contractual cash flows, because it provides useful information about the potential cash flows associated with these financial instruments. Indeed, the difference between amortized cost and fair value captures the expected impact of current economic conditions on existing financial instruments. FASB is recommending for financial instruments held for collection or payment of contractual cash flows that amortized cost and fair value information be given equal prominence on the financial statements and, thus, that both measures be made available for these financial instruments in public releases of financial reporting information. This dual presentation in financial statements — which some investors have asked for—would ensure that both relevant measures are given adequate attention by banks and their auditors.

== Auditors' Role in the 2008 financial crisis ==
=== Demand for Audits ===
The primary driver of audit demand is the desire to enhance credibility of the information that companies make available to their potential investors. Without an independent party verifying and providing an opinion on a company's financial statements, it is significantly more difficult for firms to attract the investment of the uninformed public. It is, therefore, in a company's best interest to have an individual outside of the firm perform an audit in order to provide assurance on the reliability of the information made available to the public. This principle of value derived from an audit is evidenced by the fact that 82 percent of companies listed on the New York Stock Exchange were being audited by CPA's even before it became mandatory with the Securities Exchange Acts of 1933 and 1934.

=== Information Asymmetry ===
The concept of information asymmetry demonstrates the need for auditors as it shows how the gap in information can cause market inefficiencies. Information asymmetry occurs when one party in a transaction has either more or superior information than the other party involved has. This becomes a problem because it does not allow for the uninformed party to make sound decisions. The result often leaves the party without the information ending up on the loser's side of the deal.

When information asymmetry is pertinent, a situation known as a "Market for Lemons" may occur. This theory states that when a seller is more informed than a buyer, the buyer should assume that the quality of the product is average at best due to the lack of information. Therefore, sellers of high quality products will not be able to get the value that they want from buyers and have no choice but to withdraw from the market unless they are willing to receive an unfair price. This leaves only lower quality items left for sale. The result is that trading occurs only at low levels of quality, leaving out both those who want to buy and sell high quality products.

=== Information Gap during the 2008 financial crisis ===
The 2008 financial crisis showed evidence of this theory as investors couldn't decipher between securities that were backed by high quality or sub-prime home loans. It is likely that had better information been made available to investors, they would have stayed away from the investments backed by these bad mortgages, or at minimum would have demanded higher yield rates. Information asymmetry can lead to extremely inefficient markets, and the need for credible information brings rise to someone who can help bridge the gap between buyers and sellers.

=== Effect of Audit Quality on Information ===
Factors such as independence, expertise, and extent of testing, among others, influence the quality of an audit. A high-quality audit is more desirable than a low-quality audit because it provides more assurance of detecting material misstatements that could mislead investors. Studies show that audits that are high in quality also lead to higher quality information in the capital markets and less information asymmetry between traders. Experienced audit staff and the use of industry specialists are listed as contributors of audit quality, which results in an increased quality in the transfer of information.

Conversely, as audit quality begins to decrease it is more likely that material information that should be disclosed will be excluded because it was not detected. A common catalyst of audit quality suffering is when firms focus on checking off the procedures performed during an audit without giving adequate attention to the underlying forces driving the figures. In an effort to increase audit efficiency auditors may be tempted to perform the minimum amount of work necessary to follow the legal or firm-wide requirements of an audit.

Even if an audit is performed in accordance with Generally Accepted Auditing Standards, it is possible that an audit will fail to discover potentially misleading information. For this reason, it is crucial for auditors to plan the audit engagement in such a way that they can obtain a great understanding of the client's business, and in particular, areas that are susceptible to high levels of risk.

=== Auditor Shortcomings in the Crisis ===
In light of the information available, it is clear that several different groups played a major role in either causing or exacerbating the crisis. Although auditors may not have been a primary culprit in causing the crisis, it seems that more could have been done to prevent these events from occurring. Before assigning any blame to auditors, it is important to remember the role they play in the financial markets.

Auditors provide assurance on whether the information included in a company's financial statements is free of material misstatement, disclosed properly, and is in conformance with Generally Accepted Accounting Principles. It is not an auditor's duty to stop companies from making unwise business decisions that put their stakeholders at risk. However, auditors have drawn criticism for overlooking whether the information disclosed was adequate in accurately reflecting company strength.

One area that auditors may have failed to perform their duty during the crisis was in understanding how management was valuing their assets. It is an auditor's responsibility to assess these valuations, and had auditors fulfilled this duty to an adequate level it seems extremely likely that the shaky foundation of the mortgage-backed securities would have been uncovered.

Auditors clearly serve a very important role in maintaining the proper functioning of the market. Because of their high levels of skill and expertise, an auditor's opinion carries significant weight in helping mitigate the risk of information gaps in the market. For this reason, the public has every right to believe that an unqualified opinion from an auditor really does stand for something. In the case of the 2008 financial crisis, one can argue that this broader purpose of the audit took a back seat to satisfying the legal requirements of an audit as efficiently as possible.

=== Moving Forward ===
As auditors move towards continual improvement in audit quality, the chance of audit failure significantly decreases. The ability to learn from mistakes made during the 2008 financial crisis could help auditors plan future engagements in a way that minimizes the likelihood of overlooking key factors in the audit. This could result in a significant reduction of problems at the magnitude we observed over the last few years in the crisis. In order to accomplish this goal, auditors should go further than simply adhering to auditing standards. This may be achieved by implementing practices that attempt to satisfy the full intent of the standards in place. Although it is unlikely that audit failures will ever be eliminated, if firms adopt this type of approach it is realistic to think that crises in the future will not leave such drastic results.
