= Treasurer =

Person responsible for running the treasury of an organization

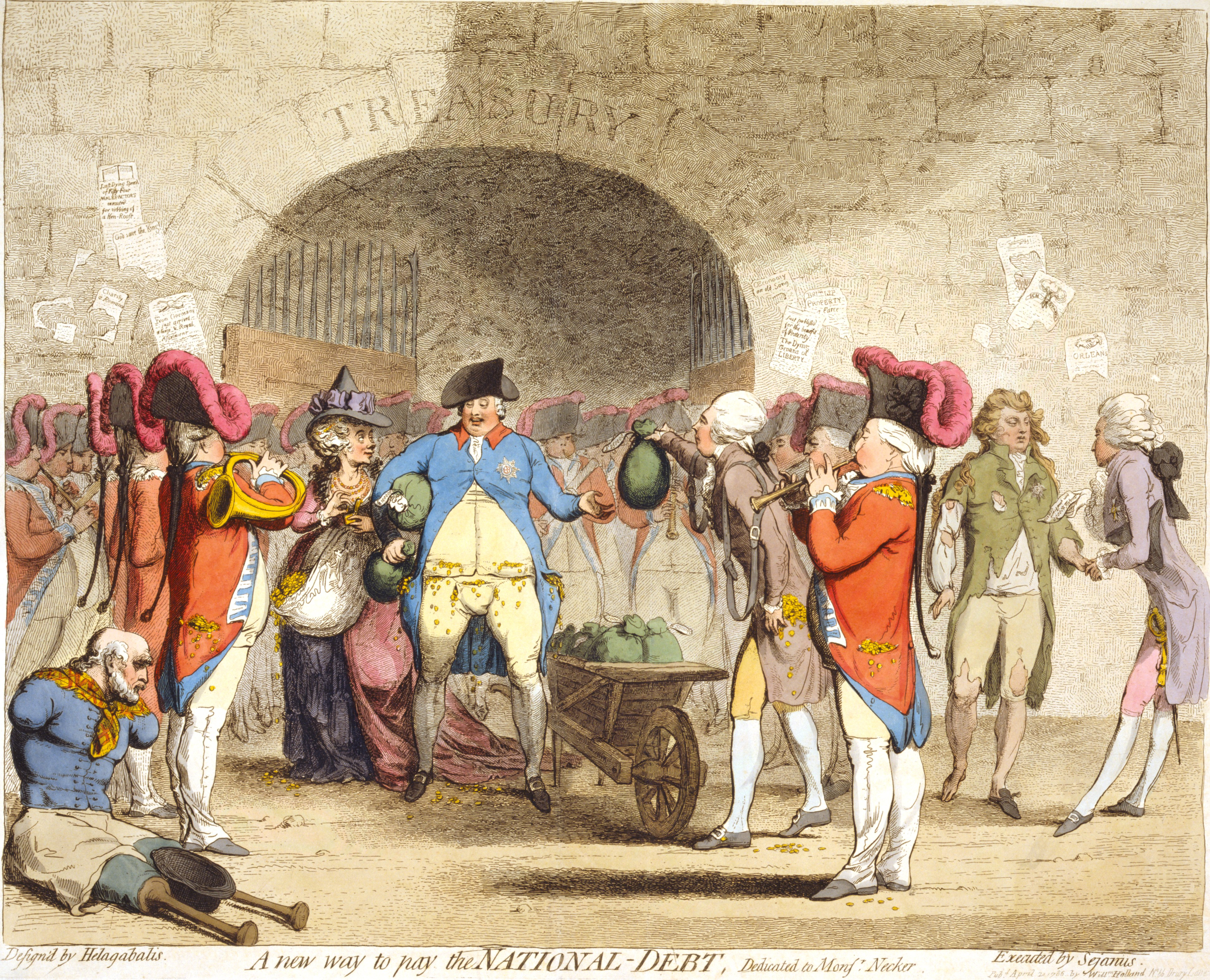
In A new way to pay the National Debt (1786), James Gillray caricatured Queen Charlotte and King George III awash with treasury funds to cover royal debts, with Pitt handing them another moneybag.

A treasurer is a person responsible for the financial operations of a government, business, or other organization.

== Government ==
The treasury of a country is the department responsible for the country's economy, finance and revenue. The treasurer is generally the head of the treasury, although, in some countries (such as the United Kingdom or the United States) the treasury reports to a Secretary of the Treasury or Chancellor of the Exchequer.

In Australia, the Treasurer is a senior minister and usually the second or third most important member of the government after the Prime Minister and Deputy Prime Minister. Each Australian state and self-governing territory also has its own treasurer.

From 1867 to 1993, Ontario's Minister of Finance was called the Treasurer of Ontario.

Originally the word referred to the person in charge of the treasure of a noble; however, it has now moved into wider use. In England during the 17th century, a position of Lord High Treasurer was used on several occasions as the third great officer of the Crown. Now the title First Lord of the Treasury is the official title of the British Prime Minister.

== Corporate treasurers ==
In corporations, the Treasurer is the head of the corporate treasury department. They are typically responsible for: liquidity risk management; cash management; issuing debt, and capital structure more generally (including share issuance and repurchase); managing intercompany transactions denominated in foreign currencies, interest rate risk hedging, and currency analytics; securitizations; oversight of pension investment management. They also typically advise the corporation on matters relating to corporate finance. They could also have oversight of other areas, such as the purchase of insurance.

== In the Inns of Court ==
In the Inns of Court, the professional associations for barristers in England and Wales, the bencher or master of the bench who heads the inn for that year holds the title 'master treasurer'.

This title is similarly used by other legal associations sharing a British heritage, such as the Law Society of Upper Canada.

== Volunteer organizations ==
Many volunteer organizations, particularly not-for-profit organizations such as charities and theaters, appoint treasurers who are responsible for conservation of the treasury, whether this be through pricing of a product, organizing sponsorship, or arranging fundraising events.

The treasurer would also be part of the group which would oversee how the money is spent, either directly dictating expenditure or authorizing it as required. It is their responsibility to ensure that the organization has enough money to carry out their stated aims and objectives, and that they do not overspend, or under spend. They also report to the board meetings or the general membership the financial status of the organization to ensure checks and balances. Accurate records and supporting documentation must be kept to a reasonable level of detail that provides a clear audit trail for all transactions.

== See also ==
- Auditor general
- Bursar
- Bursary
- Certified Treasury Professional
- Chief financial officer
- Chief investment officer
- Comptroller
- Treasury management
