= Deprival value =

Concept in accounting theory

Deprival value is a concept used in accounting theory to determine the appropriate measurement basis for assets. It is an alternative to historical cost and fair value or mark to market accounting. Some writers prefer terms such as 'value to the owner' or 'value to the firm'. Deprival value is also sometimes advocated for liabilities, in which case another term such as 'Relief value' may be used.

The deprival value of an asset is the extent to which the entity is "better off" because it holds the asset. This may be thought of as the answer to the following questions, all of which are equivalent: - What amount would just compensate the entity for the loss of the asset? - What loss would the entity sustain if deprived of the asset? - How much would the entity rationally pay to acquire the asset (if it did not already hold it)?

== Deprival value explained ==
Deprival value is based on the premise that the value of an asset is equivalent to the loss that the owner of an asset would sustain if deprived of that asset. It builds on the insight that often the owner of an asset can use an asset to derive greater value than that which would be obtained from an immediate sale. For example, a machine may be profitably employed in a business but no more than scrap value could be obtained from its sale (net selling price).

Deprival value reasons that the maximum value at which an asset should be stated is its replacement cost as, by definition, the owner can make good the loss arising from deprival by incurring a cost equivalent to replacement cost. However, if that amount is greater than the amount that can be derived from ownership of the asset, it should be valued at no more than its recoverable amount. Recoverable amount is, in turn, defined as the higher of net selling price and value in use, which is the present value of the future returns that will be made by continuing to use the asset.

In summary:

- Deprival value equals the lower of replacement cost and recoverable amount; and
- Recoverable amount is the higher of net selling price and value in use.

An important practical implication of deprival value reasoning is that many assets will be stated at replacement cost, as entities tend to hold and use assets that they can employ profitably and dispose of those that they cannot.

== Criticisms of deprival value ==
Critics of deprival value assert that it is more complex than other measurement bases. Its use may also give rise to values that differ significantly from market values. Comparison between the values of assets owned by different entities may be difficult where deprival value is used because it reflects the position of the reporting entity. Critics also point out that the calculation of value in use is difficult and may be subjective.

== History and current developments ==
The origin of deprival value is frequently ascribed to JC Bonbright's 1937 work The Valuation of Property. Edwards and Bell's The Theory and Measurement of Business Income (1961) was hugely influential in emphasising the difference between entry and exit values and making the case for replacement cost. Articles by Solomons, David and Parker and Harcourt influenced a generation of accounting scholars. In his 1975 work, WT Baxter seems to have been the first to use the term 'deprival value'.

During the 1970s deprival value played a major role in the development of accounting in times of inflation, being endorsed by official reports in the UK, Australia, New Zealand and Canada Deprival value also formed the basis of the disclosures required in the United States by SFAS 33.

Although the extent to which deprival value contributed to the failure of attempts to introduce inflation accounting is debatable (see Tweedie and Whittington for a review) there is no doubt that interest in deprival value subsequently declined. It was, however, endorsed in 1999 by the UK Accounting Standards Board in its Statement of Principles for Financial Reporting and has featured in recent collections of articles on accounting measurement.

Most recently, the International Public Sector Accounting Standards Board has discussed deprival value (and its application to liabilities under the 'relief value' model) in a Consultation Paper issued as part of its project to develop a Conceptual Framework for General Purpose Financial Reporting by Public Sector Entities.

The methodology has been applied to electricity sector regulation in New Zealand.

== See also ==
- Fair value
- Historical cost
- Mark-to-market accounting
