= SFAS =

SFAS is an acronym that may refer to:

- Special Forces Assessment and Selection
- Statements of Financial Accounting Standards
