= FASB 133 =

Rule in US private sector accounting

Launched prior to the millennium, (and subsequently amended) FAS 133 Accounting for Derivative Instruments and Hedging Activities provided an "integrated accounting framework for derivative instruments and hedging activities."

== FAS 133 Overview ==
Statements of Financial Accounting Standards No. 133, Accounting for Derivative Instruments and Hedging Activities, commonly known as FAS 133, is an accounting standard issued in June 1998 by the Financial Accounting Standards Board (FASB) that requires companies to measure all assets and liabilities on their balance sheet at “fair value”. This standard was created in response to significant hedging losses involving derivatives years ago and the attempt to control and manage corporate hedging as risk management not earnings management.

All derivatives within the scope of FAS133 must be recorded at fair value as an asset or liability. Hedge accounting may be applied if there is hedge documentation and gains and losses in the value of the derivative with gains and losses in the value of the underlying transaction.

To be designated and qualify for FAS 133 hedge accounting, a commodity (hedged item) and its hedging instrument must have a correlation ratio between 80% and 125%, and the reporting enterprise must have hedge documentation in place at the inception of the hedge. If these criteria are not met, hedge accounting cannot be applied. The non-applicability of hedge accounting can lead to significant volatility in corporate earnings. Now, the financial community has had enough experience with FAS 133 that companies and constituents better understand this process and are less critical of the volatile impact on earnings.

Creating forward commodity values to determine correlation, required by FAS 133, is not perfect due to the nature of different OTC derivative commodities and the fact that they are not quoted in exchanges like NYMEX and ICE. Many companies outsource this data collection to ensure that industry methods and standards are achieved. As important as FASB 133 is in risk management and hedging, this reporting system has limited some creative hedges solely based on the potential negative impact on the companies’ earnings.

== Amendments & Interpretations ==
=== FAS 161 Disclosures about Derivative Instruments and Hedging Activities—an amendment of FASB Statement No. 133 ===
- March 2008
- requires enhanced disclosures about derivative (finance) contracts and hedging activities to enable investors to better understand their effects on an entity’s financial position, financial performance, and cash flows. Goal: improve transparency.

=== FASB Staff Position FAS 133-1 Disclosures about Credit Derivatives and Certain Guarantees: An Amendment of FASB Statement No. 133 ===
- September 2008
- Specifically requires disclosures by sellers of credit derivatives, including credit derivatives embedded in hybrid instruments.

=== FASB Interpretation FIN 45, Guarantor’s Accounting and Disclosure Requirements for Guarantees, Including Indirect Guarantees of Indebtedness to Others ===
- September 2008
- requires an additional disclosure about the current status of the payment/performance risk of a guarantee.
- reflected the Board’s belief that instruments with similar risks should have similar disclosures.
- 45-4 Clarification of the Effective Date of FASB Statement No. 161

Some provisions of the amendment to FAS 133 became effective sooner than the requirements of FAS 161. The quirkiness of the effective date and its 'earlier' implementation requirements caught some practitioners and impacted financial statement preparers a bit off-guard. In light of recent financial market turmoil linked to the mortgage and banking crisis that reached new degrees of severity in 2008, FASB was concerned new required disclosures for sellers of credit protection (such as institutional investors opening sell protection credit default swaps ("CDS") contracts) needed to be quickly implemented as financial statement readers needed to know more about the risks associated with those types of arrangements, which were associated with and/or contributed toward the recent failure of Lehman Brothers and AIG.

=== SEC asks FASB to review ===
SEC asked FASB to review accounting for hedging derivatives when counterparties change

== See also ==
- FASB
- List of FASB Pronouncements
- IAS 39
- Foreign Exchange Hedge
- Hedge accounting
