= Constant purchasing power accounting =

Accounting model

Constant purchasing power accounting (CPPA) is an accounting model that is an alternative to model historical cost accounting under high inflation and hyper-inflationary environments. It has been approved for use by the International Accounting Standards Board (IASB) and the US Financial Accounting Standards Board (FASB). Under this IFRS and US GAAP authorized system, financial capital maintenance is always measured in units of constant purchasing power (CPP) in terms of a Daily CPI (consumer price index) during low inflation, high inflation, hyperinflation and deflation; i.e., during all possible economic environments. During all economic environments it can also be measured in a monetized daily indexed unit of account (e.g. the Unidad de Fomento in Chile) or in terms of a daily relatively stable foreign currency parallel rate, particularly during hyperinflation when a government refuses to publish CPI data.

== Authorized by the IASB during low inflation ==
In the IASB's original Framework (1989), Par 104 (a), CPPA was authorized as an alternative to the traditional HCA model at all levels of inflation and deflation, including during hyperinflation as required in IAS 29. Income statement constant items like salaries, wages, rents, pensions, utilities, transport fees, etc. are normally valued in units of CPP during low inflation in most economies as an annual update. Payments in money for these items are normally inflation-adjusted by means of the consumer price index (CPI) to compensate for the erosion of the real value of money (the monetary medium of exchange) by inflation only on an annual not daily basis. "Inflation is always and everywhere a monetary phenomenon" and can only erode the real value of money (the functional currency inside an economy) and other monetary items. Inflation can not and does not erode the real value of non-monetary items. Inflation has no effect on the real value of non-monetary items.

== Net monetary gains and losses authorized during low inflation and deflation in IFRS since 1989 ==
Accountants have to calculate the net monetary loss or gain from holding monetary items when they choose the CMUCPP model and measure financial CMUCPP in the same way as the IASB currently requires its calculation and accounting during hyperinflation. The calculation and accounting of net monetary losses and gains during low inflation and deflation have thus been authorized in IFRS since 1989. There are net monetary losses and net monetary gains during low inflation too, but they are not required to be calculated when accountants choose the traditional HCA model.

Net constant item gains and losses are also calculated and accounted under CMUCPP.

== Underlying assumptions ==
IFRS authorize three basic accounting models:

1. Physical Capital Maintenance.

2. Financial capital maintenance in nominal monetary units or Historical cost accounting (see the Framework (1989), Par 104 (a)).

3. Constant Purchasing Power Accounting (see the Framework (1989), Par 104 (a)).

A. Under Historical cost accounting the underlying assumptions used in IFRS are:

- Accrual basis: the effect of transactions and other events are recognized when they occur, not as cash is gained or paid.
- Going concern: an entity will continue for the foreseeable future.
- Stable measuring unit assumption: financial capital maintenance in nominal monetary units or traditional Historical cost accounting; i.e., accountants consider changes in the purchasing power of the functional currency up to but excluding 26% per annum for three years in a row (which would be 100% cumulative inflation over three years or hyperinflation as defined in IFRS) as immaterial or not sufficiently important for them to choose financial capital maintenance in units of CPP during low inflation and deflation as authorized in IFRS in the Framework (1989), Par 104 (a).

The stable measuring unit assumption (traditional Historical Cost Accounting) during annual inflation of 26% for 3 years in a row would erode 100% of the real value of all constant real value non-monetary items not maintained under the Historical Cost paradigm.

B. Under Constant Purchasing Power Accounting the underlying assumptions in IFRS are:

- Accrual basis: the effect of transactions and other events are recognized when they occur, not as cash is gained or paid.
- Going concern: an entity will continue for the foreseeable future.
- Measurement in units of CPP of all constant real value non-monetary items automatically remedies the erosion caused by the stable measuring unit assumption (Historical Cost Accounting) of the real non-monetary values of all constant real value non-monetary items never maintained constant at all levels of inflation and deflation. It is not low inflation, high inflation or hyperinflation doing the eroding. It is the implementation of the stable measuring unit assumption during low inflation, high inflation and hyperinflation. Constant real value non-monetary items are measured in units of CPP in terms of a daily rate at all levels of inflation and deflation. Monetary items are inflation-adjusted daily. Net monetary losses and gains are calculated when monetary items are not inflation-adjusted daily in terms of a daily rate. Variable items are measured in terms of IFRS and then updated daily in terms of a daily rate. All non-monetary items (variable real value non-monetary items and constant real value non-monetary items) in Historical Cost or Current Cost period-end financial statements are restated in terms of the period-end monthly published CPI during hyperinflation as required in IAS 29 Financial Reporting in Hyperinflationary Economies.

== Difference between US GAAP and IFRS ==
A major difference between US GAAP and IFRS is the fact that three fundamentally different concepts of capital and capital maintenance are authorized in IFRS while US GAAP only authorize two capital and capital maintenance concepts during low inflation and deflation: (1) physical capital maintenance and (2) financial capital maintenance in nominal monetary units (traditional Historical Cost Accounting) as stated in Par 45 to 48 in the FASB Conceptual Statement Nº 5. US GAAP does not recognize the third concept of capital and capital maintenance during low inflation and deflation, namely, financial CMUCPP as authorized in IFRS in the framework, Par 104 (a) in 1989.

  - Concepts of capital
- Par 102 A financial concept of capital is adopted by most entities in preparing their financial statements. Under a financial concept of capital, such as invested money or invested purchasing power, capital is synonymous with the net assets or equity of the entity. Under a physical concept of capital, such as operating capability, capital is regarded as the productive capacity of the entity based on, for example, units of output per day.
- Par 103 The selection of the appropriate concept of capital by an entity should be based on the needs of the users of its financial statements. Thus, a financial concept of capital should be adopted if the users of financial statements are primarily concerned with the maintenance of nominal invested capital or the purchasing power of invested capital. If, however, the main concern of users is with the operating capability of the entity, a physical concept of capital should be used. The concept chosen indicates the goal to be attained in determining profit, even though there may be some measurement difficulties in making the concept operational.

== Concepts of capital maintenance and the determination of profit ==
- Par 104 The concepts of capital give rise to the following concepts of capital maintenance:
  - (a) Financial capital maintenance. Under this concept a profit is earned only if the financial (or money) amount of the net assets at the end of the period exceeds the financial (or money) amount of net assets at the beginning of the period, after excluding any distributions to, and contributions from, owners during the period. Financial capital maintenance can be measured in either nominal monetary units or units of CPP.
  - (b) Physical capital maintenance. Under this concept a profit is earned only if the physical productive capacity (or operating capability) of the entity (or the resources or funds needed to achieve that capacity) at the end of the period exceeds the physical productive capacity at the beginning of the period, after excluding any distributions to, and contributions from, owners during the period.

The three concepts of capital defined in IFRS during low inflation and deflation are:

- (A) Physical capital. See paragraph 102.
- (B) Nominal financial capital. See paragraph 104 (a).
- (C) Constant purchasing power financial capital. See paragraph 104 (a).

The three concepts of capital maintenance authorized in IFRS during low inflation and deflation are:

- (1) Physical capital maintenance: optional during low inflation and deflation. Current Cost Accounting model prescribed by IFRS. See Par 106.
- (2) Financial capital maintenance in nominal monetary units (Historical cost accounting): authorized by IFRS but not prescribed—optional during low inflation and deflation. See Par 104 (a) Historical cost accounting. Financial capital maintenance in nominal monetary units per se during inflation and deflation is a fallacy: it is impossible to maintain the real value of financial capital constant with measurement in nominal monetary units per se during inflation and deflation.
- (3) Financial capital maintenance in units of CPP in terms of a Daily Consumer Price Index or daily rate at all levels of inflation and deflation (see the original Framework (1989), Par 104 (a)) [now Conceptual Framework (2010), Par. 4.59 (a)] under the Capital Maintenance in Units of Constant Purchasing Power paradigm.

== See also ==
- Hyperinflation
- Inflation accounting
- List of International Financial Reporting Standards
- Negative interest on excess reserves
- Purchasing power
- Unit of account
