= Mark-to-market accounting =

Accounting method valuing assets and liabilities at current market prices

Mark-to-market (MTM or M2M) or fair value accounting is accounting for the "fair value" of an asset or liability based on the current market price, or the price for similar assets and liabilities, or based on another objectively assessed "fair" value. Fair value accounting has been a part of Generally Accepted Accounting Principles (GAAP) in the United States since the early 1990s. Failure to use it is viewed as the cause of the Orange County Bankruptcy, even though its use is considered to be one of the reasons for the Enron scandal and the eventual bankruptcy of the company, as well as the closure of the accounting firm Arthur Andersen.

Mark-to-market accounting can change values on the balance sheet as market conditions change. In contrast, historical cost accounting, based on the past transactions, is simpler, more stable, and easier to perform, but does not represent current market value. It summarizes past transactions instead. Mark-to-market accounting can become volatile if market prices fluctuate greatly or change unpredictably. Buyers and sellers may claim a number of specific instances when this is the case, including inability to value the future income and expenses both accurately and collectively, often due to unreliable information, or over-optimistic or over-pessimistic expectations of cash flow and earnings.

== History and development ==
Simple example

If an investor owns 10 shares of a stock purchased at $4 per share, and that stock now trades at $6, the "mark-to-market" value of the shares is equal to (10 shares * $6), or $60, whereas the book value might (depending on the accounting principles used) equal only $40.

Similarly, if the stock decreases to $3, the mark-to-market value is $30 and the investor has an unrealized loss of $10 on the original investment.

This can create problems in the following period when the "mark-to-market" (accrual) is reversed. If the market price has changed between the ending period (12/31/prior year) and the opening market price of the following year (1/1/current year), then there is an accrual variance that must be taken into account.

In the 1800s in the U.S., marking to market was the usual practice of bookkeepers. This has been blamed for contributing to the frequent recessions up to the Great Depression and for the collapse of banks. The Securities and Exchange Commission told President Franklin Roosevelt that he should get rid of it, which he did in 1938. But in the 1980s the practice spread to major banks and corporations, and beginning in the 1990s mark-to-market accounting began to result in scandals.

To understand the original practice, consider that a futures trader, when beginning an account (or "position"), deposits money, termed a "margin", with the exchange. This is intended to protect the exchange against loss. At the end of every trading day, the contract is marked to its present market value. If the trader is on the winning side of a deal, his contract has increased in value that day, and the exchange pays this profit into his account. In contrast, if the market price of his contract has decreased, the exchange charges his account that holds the deposited margin. If the balance of this account becomes less than the deposit required to maintain the account, the trader must immediately pay additional margin into the account in order to maintain the account (a "margin call"). (The Chicago Mercantile Exchange, doing even more, marks positions to market twice a day, at 10:00 am and 2:00 pm.)

Over-the-counter (OTC) derivatives, in contrast, are formula-based financial contracts between buyers and sellers, and are not traded on exchanges, so their market prices are not established by any active, regulated market trading. Market values are, therefore, not objectively determined or available readily (purchasers of derivative contracts are typically furnished with computer programs which compute market values based upon data input from the active markets and the provided formulas). During their early development, OTC derivatives such as interest rate swaps were not marked to market frequently. Deals were monitored on a quarterly or annual basis, when gains or losses would be acknowledged or payments exchanged.

As the practice of marking to market became more used by corporations and banks, some of them seem to have discovered that this was a tempting way to commit accounting fraud, especially when the market price could not be determined objectively (because there was no real day-to-day market available or the asset value was derived from other traded commodities, such as crude oil futures), so assets were being "marked to model" in a hypothetical or synthetic manner using estimated valuations derived from financial modeling, and sometimes marked in a manipulative manner to achieve spurious valuations. The most infamous use of mark-to-market in this way was the Enron scandal.

After the Enron scandal, changes were made to the mark-to-market method by the Sarbanes–Oxley Act in the US during 2002. The Act affected mark-to-market by forcing companies to implement stricter accounting standards. The stricter standards included more explicit financial reporting, stronger internal controls to prevent and identify fraud, and auditor independence. In addition, the Public Company Accounting Oversight Board (PCAOB) was created by the Securities and Exchange Commission (SEC) for the purpose of overseeing audits. The Sarbanes-Oxley Act also implemented harsher penalties for fraud, such as enhanced prison sentences and fines for committing fraud. Although the law was created to restore investor confidence, the cost of implementing the regulations caused many companies to avoid registering on stock exchanges in the United States.

Internal Revenue Code Section 475 contains the mark-to-market accounting method rule for taxation. Section 475 provides that qualified securities dealers who elect mark-to-market treatment shall recognize gain or loss as if the property were sold for its fair market value on the last business day of the year, and any gain or loss shall be taken into account for that year. The section also provides that dealers in commodities can elect mark-to-market treatment for any commodity (or their derivatives) which is actively traded (i.e., for which there is an established financial market that provides a reasonable basis to determine fair market value by disseminating price quotes from broker/dealers or actual prices from recent transactions).

== FAS 115 ==
Statement of Financial Accounting Standards No. 115, Accounting for Certain Investments in Debt and Equity Securities, commonly known as "FAS 115", is an accounting standard issued during May 1993 by the Financial Accounting Standards Board (FASB), which became effective for entities with fiscal years beginning after December 15, 1993.

FAS 115 addresses the accounting and reporting for investments in equity securities that have readily determinable fair values and for all investments in debt securities. Those investments are to be classified in three categories and accounted for as follows:

- Debt securities that the enterprise has the positive intent and ability to hold to maturity are classified as "held-to-maturity" securities and reported at amortized cost less impairment. (Amortization refers to spreading payments over multiple periods.)
- Debt and equity securities that are bought and held principally for the purpose of selling them in the near term are classified as "trading" securities and reported at fair value, with unrealized gains and losses included in earnings.
- Debt and equity securities not classified as either held-to-maturity securities or trading securities are classified as "available-for-sale" securities and reported at fair value, with unrealized gains and losses excluded from earnings and reported in a separate component of shareholders' equity (Other Comprehensive Income).

== FAS 124 ==
Statement of Financial Accounting Standards No. 124, Accounting for Certain Investments Held by Not-for-Profit Organizations, commonly known as "FAS 124", is an accounting standard issued during November 1995 by FASB, which became effective for entities with fiscal years beginning after December 15, 1995.

FAS 124 requires that, for investments in equity securities with readily determinable fair values and for all investments in debt securities, a not-for-profit organization must report them at fair value, with gains and losses included in a Statement of Activities. A narrow exception is made to allow limited held-to-maturity accounting for a not-for-profit organization if comparable business entities are engaged in the same industry.

== FAS 157 / ASC 820 ==
Statement of Financial Accounting Standards No. 157, Fair Value Measurements, commonly known as "FAS 157", was an accounting standard issued during September 2006 by FASB, which became effective for entities with fiscal years beginning after November 15, 2007. Under Accounting Standards Codification, FASB's fair value accounting guidance has been recodified as ASC Topic 820.

FAS Statement 157 includes the following:

- Clarity of the definition of fair value;
- A fair value hierarchy used to classify the source of information used in fair value measurements (i.e., market-based or non-market based);
- Expanded disclosure requirements for assets and liabilities measured at fair value; and
- A modification of the long-standing accounting presumption that a measurement-date-specific transaction price of an asset or liability equals its same measurement-date-specific fair value.
- Clarification that changes in credit risk (both that of the counterparty and the company's own credit rating) must be included in the valuation.

FAS 157 defines "fair value" as: "The price that would be received to sell an asset or paid to transfer a liability in an orderly transaction between market participants at the measurement date".

FAS 157 only applies when another accounting rule requires or permits a fair value measure for that item. While FAS 157 does not introduce any new requirements mandating the use of fair value, the definition as outlined does introduce certain important differences.

First, it is based on the exit price (for an asset, the price at which it would be sold (bid price)) rather than an entry price (for an asset, the price at which it would be bought (ask price)), regardless of whether the entity plans to hold the asset for investment or resell it later.

Second, FAS 157 emphasizes that fair value is market-based rather than entity-specific. Thus, the optimism that often characterizes an asset acquirer must be replaced with the skepticism that typically characterizes a dispassionate, risk-averse buyer.

FAS 157's fair value hierarchy underpins the concepts of the standard. The hierarchy ranks the quality and reliability of information used to determine fair values, with level 1 inputs being the most reliable and level 3 inputs being the least reliable. Information based on direct observations of transactions (e.g., quoted prices) involving the same assets and liabilities, not assumptions, offers superior reliability; whereas, inputs based on unobservable data or a reporting entity's own assumptions about the assumptions market participants would use are the least reliable. A typical example of the latter is shares of a privately owned company the value of which is based on projected cash flows.

Problems can occur when the market-based measurement does not accurately represent the underlying asset's true value. This can occur when a company is forced to calculate the selling price of these assets or liabilities during unfavorable or volatile times, such as a financial crisis. For example, if the liquidity is low or investors are fearful, the current selling price of a bank's assets could be much less than the value under normal liquidity conditions. The result would be a lowered shareholders' equity. This case occurred during the 2008 financial crisis, where many securities held on banks' balance sheets could not be valued efficiently as the markets had disappeared from them. During April 2009, however, the Financial Accounting Standards Board (FASB) voted on and approved new guidelines that would allow for the valuation to be based on a price that would be received in an orderly market rather than a forced liquidation, starting during the first quarter of 2009.

Although FAS 157 does not require fair value to be used on any new classes of assets, it does apply to assets and liabilities that are recorded at fair value in accordance with other applicable rules. The accounting rules for which assets and liabilities are held at fair value are complex. Mutual funds and securities companies have recorded assets and some liabilities at fair value for decades in accordance with securities regulations and other accounting guidance. For commercial banks and other types of financial services companies, some asset classes are required to be recorded at fair value, such as derivatives and marketable equity securities. For other types of assets, such as loan receivables and debt securities, it depends on whether the assets are held for trading (active buying and selling) or for investment. All trading assets are recorded at fair value. Loans and debt securities that are held for investment or to maturity are recorded at amortized cost, unless they are deemed to be impaired (in which case, a loss is recognized). However, if they are available for sale or held for sale, they are required to be recorded at fair value or the lower of cost or fair value, respectively. (FAS 65 and FAS 114 cover the accounting for loans, and FAS 115 covers the accounting for securities.) Notwithstanding the above, companies are permitted to account for almost any financial instrument at fair value, which they might elect to do in lieu of historical cost accounting (see FAS 159, "The Fair Value Option").

Thus, FAS 157 applies in the cases above where a company is required or elects to record an asset or liability at fair value.

The rule requires a mark to "market", rather than to some theoretical price calculated by a computer — a system often criticized as "mark to make-believe". (Occasionally, for certain types of assets, the rule allows for using a model.)

Sometimes, there is a weak market for assets which trade relatively infrequently - often during an economic crisis. During these periods, there are few, if any buyers for such products. This complicates the marking process. In the absence of market information, an entity is allowed to use its own assumptions, but the objective is still the same: what would be the current value of a sale to a willing buyer. In developing its own assumptions, the entity can not ignore any available market data, such as interest rates, default rates, prepayment speeds, etc.

FAS 157 does not distinguish between non cash-generating assets, i.e., broken equipment, which can theoretically have zero value if nobody will buy them in the market – and cash-generating assets, like securities, which are still worth something for as long as they earn some income from their underlying assets. The latter cannot be marked down indefinitely, or at some point, can create incentives for company insiders to buy them from the company at the under-valued prices. Insiders are in the best position to determine the creditworthiness of such securities going forward. In theory, this price pressure should balance market prices to accurately represent the "fair value" of a particular asset. Purchasers of distressed assets should buy undervalued securities, thus increasing prices, allowing other Companies to consequently mark up their similar holdings.

Also new in FAS 157 is the idea of nonperformance risk. FAS 157 requires that in valuing a liability, an entity should consider the nonperformance risk. If FAS 157 simply required that fair value be recorded as an exit price, then nonperformance risk would be extinguished upon exit. However, FAS 157 defines fair value as the price at which you would transfer a liability. In other words, the nonperformance that must be valued should incorporate the correct discount rate for an ongoing contract. An example would be to apply higher discount rate to the future cash flows to account for the credit risk above the stated interest rate. The Basis for Conclusions section has an extensive explanation of what was intended by the original statement with regards to nonperformance risk (paragraphs C40–C49).

In response to the rapid developments of the 2008 financial crisis, the FASB is fast-tracking the issuance of the proposed FAS 157-d, Determining the Fair Value of a Financial Asset in a Market That Is Not Active.

== IFRS 13 ==
IFRS 13, Fair Value Measurement, was adopted by the International Accounting Standards Board on May 12, 2011. IFRS 13 provides guidance for how to perform fair value measurement under International Financial Reporting Standards and took effect on January 1, 2013. It does not provide guidance as to when fair value should be used. The guidance is similar to the US GAAP guidance.

== Marking-to-market a derivatives position ==
In marking-to-market a derivatives account, at pre-determined periodic intervals, each counterparty exchanges the change in the market value of their account in cash. For Over-The-Counter (OTC) derivatives, when one counterparty defaults, the sequence of events that follows is governed by an ISDA contract. When using models to compute the ongoing exposure, FAS 157 requires that the entity consider the default risk ("nonperformance risk") of the counterparty and make a necessary adjustment to its computations.

For exchange traded derivatives, if one of the counterparties defaults in this periodic exchange, that counterparty's account is immediately closed by the exchange and the clearing house is substituted for that counterparty's account. Marking-to-market virtually eliminates credit risk, but it requires the use of monitoring systems that usually only large institutions can afford.

== Use by brokers ==
Stock brokers allow their clients to access credit via margin accounts. These accounts allow clients to borrow funds to buy securities. Therefore, the amount of funds available is more than the value of cash (or equivalents). The credit is provided by charging a rate of interest and requiring a certain amount of collateral, in a similar way that banks provide loans. Even though the value of securities (stocks or other financial instruments such as options) fluctuates in the market, the value of accounts is not computed in real time. Marking-to-market is performed typically at the end of the trading day, and if the account value decreases below a given threshold (typically a ratio predefined by the broker), the broker issues a margin call that requires the client to deposit more funds or liquidate the account.

== Mark-to-market accounting use by Enron ==
In Enron's natural gas business, the accounting had been fairly straightforward: in each time period, the company listed actual costs of supplying the gas and actual revenues received from selling it. However, when Skilling joined the company, he demanded that the trading business adopt mark-to-market accounting, claiming that it would represent "true economic value". Enron became the first nonfinancial company to use the method to account for its complex long-term contracts. Mark-to-market accounting requires that once a long-term contract has been signed, income is estimated as the present value of net future cash flow. Often, the viability of these contracts and their related costs were difficult to estimate. Owing to the large discrepancies between reported profits and cash, investors were typically given false or misleading reports. Under this method, income from projects that would be collected across the lifetime of the project, could all be recorded "now", with this income increasing current financial earnings on the books immediately. However, because in future years these booked revenues could no longer be booked again, new and additional revenues had to be derived from more projects to develop additional growth to appease investors. As one Enron competitor stated, "If you accelerate your income, then you have to keep doing more and more deals to show the same or rising income." Despite potential pitfalls, the U.S. Securities and Exchange Commission (SEC) approved the accounting method for Enron in its trading of natural gas futures contracts on January 30, 1992. However, Enron later expanded its use to other areas in the company to help it meet Wall Street projections.

For one contract, in July 2000, Enron and Blockbuster Video signed a 20-year agreement to introduce on-demand entertainment to various U.S. cities by year's end. After several pilot projects, Enron claimed estimated profits of more than $110 million from the deal, even though analysts questioned the technical viability and market demand of the service. When the network failed to work, Blockbuster withdrew from the contract. Enron continued to claim future profits, even though the deal resulted in a loss.

== Effect on subprime crisis and Emergency Economic Stabilization Act of 2008 ==
Former Federal Deposit Insurance Corporation Chair William Isaac placed much of the blame for the subprime mortgage crisis on the Securities and Exchange Commission and its fair-value accounting rules, especially the requirement for banks to mark their assets to market, particularly mortgage-backed securities (MBS). A review found little evidence that fair-value accounting had caused or exacerbated the crisis.

The debate occurs because this accounting rule requires companies to adjust the value of marketable securities (such as the MBS) to their market value. The intent of the standard is to help investors understand the value of these assets at a specific time, rather than just their historical purchase price. Because the market for these assets is distressed, it is difficult to sell many MBS at other than prices which may (or may not) be representative of market stresses, which may be less than the value that the mortgage cash flow related to the MBS would merit. As initially interpreted by companies and their auditors, the typically lesser sale value was used as the market value rather than the cash flow value. Many large financial institutions recognized significant losses during 2007 and 2008 as a result of marking-down MBS asset prices to market value.

For some institutions, this also triggered a margin call, such that lenders that had provided the funds using the MBS as collateral had contractual rights to get their money back. This resulted in further forced sales of MBS and emergency efforts to obtain cash (liquidity) to pay off the margin call. Markdowns may also reduce the value of bank regulatory capital, requiring additional capital raising and creating uncertainty regarding the health of the bank.

It is the combination of the extensive use of financial leverage (i.e., borrowing to invest, leaving limited funds in the event of recession), margin calls and large reported losses that may have exacerbated the crisis. If cash flow-derived value — which excludes market judgment as to default risk but may also more accurately represent "actual" value if the market is sufficiently distressed — is used (rather than sale value), the size of market-value adjustments required by the accounting standard would be typically reduced.

On September 30, 2008, the SEC and the FASB issued a joint clarification regarding the implementation of fair value accounting in cases where a market is disorderly or inactive. This guidance clarified that forced liquidations are not indicative of fair value, as this is not an "orderly" transaction. Further, it clarifies that estimates of fair value can be made using the expected cash flows from such instruments, provided that the estimates represent adjustments that a willing buyer would make, such as adjustments for default and liquidity risks.

Section 132 of the Emergency Economic Stabilization Act of 2008, which passed on October 3, 2008, restated the SEC's authority to suspend the application of FAS 157, and Section 133 required a report by the SEC which was delivered December 30, 2008.

On October 10, 2008, the FASB issued further guidance to provide an example of how to estimate fair value in cases where the market for that asset is not active at a reporting date.

On December 30, 2008, the SEC issued its report under Sec. 133 and decided not to suspend mark-to-market accounting.

On March 16, 2009, FASB proposed allowing companies to use more leeway in valuing their assets under "mark-to-market" accounting. On April 2, 2009, after a 15-day public comment period and a contentious testimony before the U.S. House Financial Services subcommittee, FASB eased the mark-to-market rules through the release of three FASB Staff Positions (FSPs). Financial institutions are still required by the rules to mark transactions to market prices but more so in a steady market and less so when the market is inactive. To proponents of the rules, this eliminates the unnecessary "positive feedback loop" that can result in a weakened economy.

On April 9, 2009, FASB issued an official update to FAS 157 that eases the mark-to-market rules when the market is unsteady or inactive. Early adopters were allowed to apply the ruling as of March 15, 2009, and the rest as of June 15, 2009. It was anticipated that these changes could significantly increase banks' statements of earnings and allow them to defer reporting losses. The changes, however, affected accounting standards applicable to a broad range of derivatives, not just banks holding mortgage-backed securities.

During January 2010, Adair Turner, Chairman of the UK's Financial Services Authority, said that marking to market had been a cause of exaggerated bankers' bonuses. This is because it produces a self-reinforcing cycle during an increasing market that feeds into banks' profit estimates. Other academics, such as S.P. Kothari and Karthik Ramanna, have made similar arguments.

== See also ==
- Creative accounting
- Deprival value
- Financial asset
- Historical cost accounting
- List of accounting topics
- List of finance topics
- Mark to model
- Revenue recognition
- Fair value accounting and the subprime mortgage crisis
- Valuation control
- Worldcom
