= List of FASB pronouncements =

Rules and decrees announced by the US private sector's main accounting board

This article is an incomplete list of Financial Accounting Standards Board (FASB) pronouncements, which consist of Statements of Financial Accounting Standards ("SFAS" or simply "FAS"), Statements of Financial Accounting Concepts, Interpretations, Technical Bulletins, and Staff Positions, which together presented rules and guidelines for preparing, presenting, and reporting financial statements within the United States according to generally accepted accounting principles ("GAAP") in the United States Of America, of which this list made up a substantial part.

The SFAS have been superseded by the FASB Accounting Standards Codification (ASC). The codification is effective for interim and annual periods ending after September 15, 2009. All existing accounting standards documents are superseded by the ASC. All other accounting literature not included in the Codification is now deemed nonauthoritative.

== Statements of Financial Accounting Standards ==
Statements of Financial Accounting Standards have been superseded by the Accounting Standards Codification, effective for periods ending after September 15, 2009. The below table lists the Statements of Financial Accounting Standards that were issued prior to the Codification.

No.	Title	Issue date	Changes..
1	Disclosure of Foreign Currency Translation Information	December 1973	Superseded by FAS 8 & FAS 52
2	Accounting for Research and Development Costs	October 1974	
3	Reporting Accounting Changes in Interim Financial Statements	March 1975	Replaced by SFAS No. 154
4	Reporting Gains and Losses from Extinguishment of Debt	March 1975	Rescinded by SFAS No. 145
5	Accounting for Contingencies	March 1975	Amended by SFAS No. 11, 112 and 114
6	Classification of Short-Term Obligations Expected to Be Refinanced	May 1975	
7	Accounting and Reporting by Development Stage Enterprises	June 1975	
8	Accounting for the Translation of Foreign Currency Transactions and Foreign Currency Financial Statement	October 1975	Superseded by FAS 52
9	Accounting for Income Taxes: Oil and Gas Producing Companies	October 1975	Superseded by FAS 19
10	Extension of "Grandfather" Provisions for Business Combinations	October 1975	Superseded by FAS 141
11	Accounting for Contingencies: Transition Method—an amendment of FASB Statement No. 5	December 1975	
12	Accounting for Certain Marketable Securities	December 1975	Superseded by FAS 115
13	Accounting for Leases	November 1976	Amended by SFAS No. 17, 22, 23, 26, 27, 28, 29, 91, 98 and 145
14	Financial Reporting for Segments of a Business Enterprise	December 1976	Supserseded by FAS 131
15	Accounting by Debtors and Creditors for Troubled Debt Restructurings	June 1977	Amended by SFAS No. 114
16	Prior Period Adjustments	June 1977	
17	Accounting for Leases: Initial Direct Costs—an amendment of FASB Statement No. 13	November 1977	Rescinded by SFAS No. 91
18	Financial Reporting for Segments of a Business Enterprise: Interim Financial Statements—an amendment of FASB Statement No. 14	November 1977	Superseded by FAS 131
19	Financial Accounting and Reporting by Oil and Gas Producing Companies	December 1977	Amended by SFAS No. 25 and 69
20	Accounting for Forward Exchange Contracts—an amendment of FASB Statement No. 8	December 1977	Superseded by FAS 52
21	Suspension of the Reporting of Earnings per Share and Segment Information by Nonpublic Enterprises—an amendment of APB Opinion No. 15 and FASB Statement No. 14	April 1978	Superseded by FAS 131
22	Changes in the Provisions of Lease Agreements Resulting from Refundings of Tax-Exempt Debt—an amendment of FASB Statement No. 13	June 1978	
23	Inception of the Lease—an amendment of FASB Statement No. 13	August 1978	
24	Reporting Segment Information in Financial Statements That Are Presented in Another Enterprise's Financial Report—an amendment of FASB Statement No. 14	December 1978	Superseded by FAS 131
25	Suspension of Certain Accounting Requirements for Oil and Gas Producing Companies—an amendment of FASB Statement No. 19	February 1979	Amended by SFAS No. 69
26	Profit Recognition on Sales-Type Leases of Real Estate—an amendment of FASB Statement No. 13	April 1979	Rescinded by SFAS No. 98
27	Classification of Renewals or Extensions of Existing Sales-Type or Direct Financing Leases—an amendment of FASB Statement No. 13	May 1979	
28	Accounting for Sales with Leasebacks—an amendment of FASB Statement No. 13	May 1979	
29	Determining Contingent Rentals—an amendment of FASB Statement No. 13	June 1979	
30	Disclosure of Information about Major Customers—an amendment of FASB Statement No. 14	August 1979	Superseded by FAS 131
31	Accounting for Tax Benefits Related to U.K. Tax Legislation Concerning Stock Relief	September 1979	Superseded by FAS 96
32	Specialized Accounting and Reporting Principles and Practices in AICPA Statements of Position and Guides on Accounting and Auditing Matters—an amendment of APB Opinion No. 20	September 1979	Rescinded by SFAS No. 111
33	Financial Reporting and Changing Prices	September 1979	Superseded by FAS 89
34	Capitalization of Interest Cost	October 1979	Amended by SFAS No. 42, 58 and 62
35	Accounting and Reporting by Defined Benefit Pension Plans	March 1980	Amended by SFAS No. 59, 75 and 110
36	Disclosure of Pension Information—an amendment of APB Opinion No. 8	May 1980	Superseded by FAS 87
37	Balance Sheet Classification of Deferred Income Taxes—an amendment of APB Opinion No. 11	July 1980	
38	Accounting for Preacquisition Contingencies of Purchased Enterprises—an amendment of APB Opinion No. 16	September 1980	Superseded by FAS 141
39	Financial Reporting and Changing Prices: Specialized Assets-Mining and Oil and Gas—a supplement to FASB Statement No. 33	October 1980	Superseded by FAS 89
40	Financial Reporting and Changing Prices: Specialized Assets-Timberlands and Growing Timber—a supplement to FASB Statement No. 33	November 1980	Superseded by FAS 89
41	Financial Reporting and Changing Prices: Specialized Assets-Income-Producing Real Estate—a supplement to FASB Statement No. 33	November 1980	Superseded by FAS 89
42	Determining Materiality for Capitalization of Interest Cost—an amendment of FASB Statement No. 34	November 1980	
43	Accounting for Compensated Absences	November 1980	
44	Accounting for Intangible Assets of Motor Carriers—an amendment of Chapter 5 of ARB No. 43 and an interpretation of APB Opinions 17 and 30	December 1980	Rescinded by SFAS No. 145
45	Accounting for Franchise Fee Revenue	March 1981	Amended by SFAS No. 112
46	Financial Reporting and Changing Prices: Motion Picture Films	March 1981	Superseded by FAS 89
47	Disclosure of Long-Term Obligations		
48	Revenue Recognition When Right of Return Exists	June 1981	
49	Accounting for Product Financing Arrangements	June 1981	
50	Financial Reporting in the Record and Music Industry	November 1981	
51	Financial Reporting by Cable Television Companies	November 1981	
52	Foreign Currency Translation	December 1981	
53	Financial Reporting by Producers and Distributors of Motion Picture Films	December 1981	Rescinded by SFAS No. 139
54	Financial Reporting and Changing Prices: Investment Companies—an amendment of FASB Statement No. 33	January 1982	Superseded by FAS 89
55	Determining whether a Convertible Security is a Common Stock Equivalent—an amendment of APB Opinion No. 15	February 1982	Superseded by FAS 111
56	Designation of AICPA Guide and Statement of Position (SOP) 81–1 on Contractor Accounting and SOP 81-2 concerning Hospital-Related Organizations as Preferable for Purposes of Applying APB Opinion 20—an amendment of FASB Statement No. 32	February 1982	Superseded by FAS 111
57	Related Party Disclosures	March 1982	
58	Capitalization of Interest Cost in Financial Statements That Include Investments Accounted for by the Equity Method—an amendment of FASB Statement No. 34	April 1982	
59	Deferral of the Effective Date of Certain Accounting Requirements for Pension Plans of State and Local Governmental Units—an amendment of FASB Statement No. 35	April 1982	Superseded by FAS 75
60	Accounting and Reporting by Insurance Enterprises	June 1982	Amended by SFAS No. 91 and 120
61	Accounting for Title Plant	June 1982	
62	Capitalization of Interest Cost in Situations Involving Certain Tax-Exempt Borrowings and Certain Gifts and Grants—an amendment of FASB Statement No. 34	June 1982	
63	Financial Reporting by Broadcasters	June 1982	Amended by SFAS No. 139
64	Extinguishments of Debt Made to Satisfy Sinking-Fund Requirements—an amendment of FASB Statement No. 4	September 1982	Rescinded by SFAS No. 145
65	Accounting for Certain Mortgage Banking Activities	September 1982	Amended by SFAS No. 91, 122, and 134
66	Accounting for Sales of Real Estate	October 1982	Amended by SFAS No. 98 and 152
67	Accounting for Costs and Initial Rental Operations of Real Estate Projects	October 1982	Amended by SFAS No. 152
68	Research and Development Arrangements	October 1982	
69	Disclosures about Oil and Gas Producing Activities—an amendment of FASB Statements 19, 25, 33, and 39	November 1982	
70	Financial Reporting and Changing Prices: Foreign Currency Translation—an amendment of FASB Statement No. 33	December 1982	Superseded by FAS 89
71	Accounting for the Effects of Certain Types of Regulation	December 1982	Amended by SFAS No. 90 and 92
72	Accounting for Certain Acquisitions of Banking or Thrift Institutions—an amendment of APB Opinion No. 17, an interpretation of APB Opinions 16 and 17, and an amendment of FASB Interpretation No. 9	February 1983	Rescinded by SFAS No. 147
73	Reporting a Change in Accounting for Railroad Track Structures—an amendment of APB Opinion No. 20	August 1983	Superseded by FAS 154
74	Accounting for Special Termination Benefits Paid to Employees	August 1983	Superseded by FAS 88
75	Deferral of the Effective Date of Certain Accounting Requirements for Pension Plans of State and Local Governmental Units—an amendment of FASB Statement No. 35	November 1983	Rescinded by SFAS No. 135
76	Extinguishment of Debt-an amendment of APB Opinion No. 26	November 1983	Superseded by FAS 125
77	Reporting by Transferors for Transfers of Receivables with Recourse	December 1983	Superseded by FAS 125
78	Classification of Obligations That Are Callable by the Creditor—an amendment of ARB No. 43, Chapter 3A	December 1983	
79	Elimination of Certain Disclosures for Business Combinations by Nonpublic Enterprises—an amendment of APB Opinion No. 16	February 1984	Superseded by FAS 141
80	Accounting for Futures Contracts	August 1984	Superseded by FAS 133
81	Disclosure of Postretirement Health Care and Life Insurance Benefits	November 1984	Superseded by FAS 106
82	Financial Reporting and Changing Prices: Elimination of Certain Disclosures—an amendment of FASB Statement No. 33	November 1984	Superseded by FAS 89
83	Designation of AICPA Guides and Statement of Position on Accounting by Brokers and Dealers in Securities, by Employee Benefit Plans, and by Banks as Preferable for Purposes of Applying APB Opinion 20—an amendment FASB Statement No. 32 and APB Opinion No. 30 and a rescission of FASB Interpretation No. 10	March 1985	Superseded by FAS 111
84	Induced Conversions of Convertible Debt—an amendment of APB Opinion No. 26	March 1985	
85	Yield Test for Determining whether a Convertible Security is a Common Stock Equivalent—an amendment of APB Opinion No. 15	March 1985	Superseded by FAS 128
86	Accounting for the Costs of Computer Software to Be Sold, Leased, or Otherwise Marketed	August 1985	
87	Employers' Accounting for Pensions	December 1985	Amended by SFAS No. 132R and No. 158
88	Employers' Accounting for Settlements and Curtailments of Defined Benefit Pension Plans and for Termination Benefits	December 1985	Amended by SFAS No. 132R and No. 158
89	Financial Reporting and Changing Prices	December 1986	Amended by SFAS No. 139
90	Regulated Enterprises-Accounting for Abandonments and Disallowances of Plant Costs—an amendment of FASB Statement No. 71	December 1986	
91	Accounting for Nonrefundable Fees and Costs Associated with Originating or Acquiring Loans and Initial Direct Costs of Leases—an amendment of FASB Statements No. 13, 60, and 65 and a rescission of FASB Statement No. 17	December 1986	Amended by SFAS No. 98
92	Regulated Enterprises-Accounting for Phase-in Plans—an amendment of FASB Statement No. 71	August 1987	
93	Recognition of Depreciation by Not-for-Profit Organizations	August 1987	Amended by SFAS No. 99
94	Consolidation of All Majority-owned Subsidiaries—an amendment of ARB No. 51, with related amendments of APB Opinion No. 18 and ARB No. 43, Chapter 12	October 1987	
95	Statement of Cash Flows	November 1987	Amended by SFAS No. 102 and 104
96	Accounting for Income Taxes	December 1987	Superseded by FAS 109
97	Accounting and Reporting by Insurance Enterprises for Certain Long-Duration Contracts and for Realized Gains and Losses from the Sale of Investments	December 1987	Amended by SFAS No. 120
98	Accounting for Leases: Sale-Leaseback Transactions Involving Real Estate, Sales-Type Leases of Real Estate, Definition of the Lease Term, and Initial Direct Costs of Direct Financing Leases—an amendment of FASB Statements No. 13, 66, and 91 and a rescission of FASB Statement No. 26 and Technical Bulletin No. 79-11	May 1988	
99	Deferral of the Effective Date of Recognition of Depreciation by Not-for-Profit Organizations—an amendment of FASB Statement No. 93	September 1988	
100	Accounting for Income Taxes-Deferral of the Effective Date of FASB Statement No. 96—an amendment of FASB Statement No. 96	December 1988	Superseded by FAS 103
101	Regulated Enterprises-Accounting for the Discontinuation of Application of FASB Statement No. 71	December 1988	
102	Statement of Cash Flows-Exemption of Certain Enterprises and Classification of Cash Flows from Certain Securities Acquired for Resale—an amendment of FASB Statement No. 95	February 1989	
103	Accounting for Income Taxes-Deferral of the Effective Date of FASB Statement No. 96—an amendment of FASB Statement No. 96	December 1989	Superseded by FAS 108
104	Statement of Cash Flows-Net Reporting of Certain Cash Receipts and Cash Payments and Classification of Cash Flows from Hedging Transactions—an amendment of FASB Statement No. 95	December 1989	
105	Disclosure of Information about Financial Instruments with Off-Balance-Sheet Risk and Financial Instruments with Concentrations of Credit Risk	March 1990	Superseded by FAS 133
106	Employers' Accounting for Postretirement Benefits Other Than Pensions	December 1990	Amended by SFAS No. 132R and No. 158
107	Disclosures about Fair Value of Financial Instruments	December 1991	Amended by SFAS No. 126
108	Accounting for Income Taxes-Deferral of the Effective Date of FASB Statement No. 96—an amendment of FASB Statement No. 96	December 1991	Superseded by FAS 109
109	Accounting for Income Taxes	February 1992	
110	Reporting by Defined Benefit Pension Plans of Investment Contracts—an amendment of FASB Statement No. 35	August 1992	
111	Rescission of FASB Statement No. 32 and Technical Corrections	November 1992	
112	Employers' Accounting for Postemployment Benefits—an amendment of FASB Statements No. 5 and 43	November 1992	
113	Accounting and Reporting for Reinsurance of Short-Duration and Long-Duration Contracts	December 1992	Amended by SFAS No. 120
114	Accounting by Creditors for Impairment of a Loan—an amendment of FASB Statements No. 5 and 15	May 1993	Amended by SFAS No. 118
115	Accounting for Certain Investments in Debt and Equity Securities	May 1993	Amended by SFAS No. 159
116	Accounting for Contributions Received and Contributions Made	June 1993	
117	Financial Statements of Not-for-Profit Organizations	June 1993	
118	Accounting by Creditors for Impairment of a Loan-Income Recognition and Disclosures—an amendment of FASB Statement No. 114	October 1994	
119	Disclosure about Derivative Financial Instruments and Fair Value of Financial Instruments	October 1994	Superseded by FAS 133
120	Accounting and Reporting by Mutual Life Insurance Enterprises and by Insurance Enterprises for Certain Long-Duration Participating Contracts—an amendment of FASB Statements 60, 97, and 113 and Interpretation No. 40	January 1995	
121	Accounting for the Impairment of Long-Lived Assets and for Long-Lived Assets to Be Disposed Of	March 1995	Superseded by FAS 144
122	Accounting for Mortgage Servicing Rights—an amendment of FASB Statement No. 65	May 1995	Superseded by FAS 125
123	Accounting for Stock-Based Compensation	October 1995	Revised and re-issued in December 2004
123R	Share-Based Payment	December 2004	
124	Accounting for Certain Investments Held by Not-for-Profit Organizations	November 1995	
125	Accounting for Transfers and Servicing of Financial Assets and Extinguishments of Liabilities	June 1996	Replaced by SFAS No. 140
126	Exemption from Certain Required Disclosures about Financial Instruments for Certain Nonpublic Entities—an amendment to FASB Statement No. 107	December 1996	
127	Deferral of the Effective Date of Certain Provisions of FASB Statement No. 125—an amendment to FASB Statement No. 125	December 1996	Superseded by FAS 140
128	Earnings per Share	February 1997	Amended by SFAS 150 and SFAS 160
129	Disclosure of Information about Capital Structure	February 1997	
130	Reporting Comprehensive Income	June 1997	
131	Disclosures about Segments of an Enterprise and Related Information	June 1997	
132	Employers' Disclosures about Pensions and Other Postretirement Benefits—an amendment of FASB Statements No. 87, 88, and 106	February 1998	Revised and re-issued in December 2003
132R	Employers' Disclosures about Pensions and Other Postretirement Benefits—an amendment of FASB Statements No. 87, 88, and 106	December 2003	Amended by SFAS No. 158
133	Accounting for Derivative Instruments and Hedging Activities	June 1998	Amended by SFAS No. 137, 138, 155, 161 and FSP FAS 133-1 & FIN 45–4
134	Accounting for Mortgage-Backed Securities Retained after the Securitization of Mortgage Loans Held for Sale by a Mortgage Banking Enterprise—an amendment of FASB Statement No. 65	October 1998	
135	Rescission of FASB Statement No. 75 and Technical Corrections	February 1999	
136	Transfers of Assets to a Not-for-Profit Organization or Charitable Trust That Raises or Holds Contributions for Others	June 1999	
137	Accounting for Derivative Instruments and Hedging Activities—Deferral of the Effective Date of FASB Statement No. 133—an amendment of FASB Statement No. 133	June 1999	
138	Accounting for Certain Derivative Instruments and Certain Hedging Activities-an amendment of FASB Statement No. 133	June 2000	
139	Rescission of FASB Statement No. 53 and amendments to FASB Statements No. 63, 89, and 121	June 2000	
140	Accounting for Transfers and Servicing of Financial Assets and Extinguishments of Liabilities-a replacement of FASB Statement No. 125	September 2000	Amended by SFAS No. 155 and No. 156
141	Business Combinations	June 2001	
141R	Business Combinations (Acquisition Method)	December 2007	
142	Goodwill and Other Intangible Assets	June 2001	
143	Accounting for Asset Retirement Obligations	June 2001	
144	Accounting for the Impairment or Disposal of Long-Lived Assets	August 2001	
145	Rescission of FASB Statements No. 4, 44, and 64, Amendment of FASB Statement No. 13, and Technical Corrections	April 2002	
146	Accounting for Costs Associated with Exit or Disposal Activities	June 2002	
147	Acquisitions of Certain Financial Institutions—an amendment of FASB Statements No. 72 and 144 and FASB Interpretation No. 9	October 2002	
148	Accounting for Stock-Based Compensation—Transition and Disclosure—an amendment of FASB Statement No. 123	December 2002	Superseded by FAS 123(R)
149	Amendment of Statement 133 on Derivative Instruments and Hedging Activities	April 2003	
150	Accounting for Certain Financial Instruments with Characteristics of both Liabilities and Equity	May 2003	
151	Inventory Costs—an amendment of ARB No. 43, Chapter 4	November 2004	
152	Accounting for Real Estate Time-Sharing Transactions—an amendment of FASB Statements No. 66 and 67	December 2004	
153	Exchanges of Non-monetary Assets—an amendment of APB Opinion No. 29	December 2004	
154	Accounting Changes and Error Corrections—a replacement of APB Opinion No. 20 and FASB Statement No. 3	May 2005	
155	Accounting for Certain Hybrid Financial Instruments—an amendment of FASB Statements No. 133 and 140	February 2006	
156	Accounting for Servicing of Financial Assets—an amendment of FASB Statement No. 140	March 2006	
157	Fair Value Measurements	September 2006	
158	Employers’ Accounting for Defined Benefit Pension and Other Postretirement Plans—an amendment of FASB Statements No. 87, 88, 106, and 132(R)	September 2006	
159	The Fair Value Option for Financial Assets and Financial Liabilities—Including an amendment of FASB Statement No. 115	February 2007	
160	Noncontrolling Interests in Consolidated Financial Statements—an amendment of ARB No. 51	December 2007	
161	Disclosures about Derivative Instruments and Hedging Activities—an amendment of FASB Statement No. 133	March 2008	
162	The Hierarchy of Generally Accepted Accounting Principles	May 2008	Superseded by SFAS No. 168
163	Accounting for Financial Guarantee Insurance Contracts	May 2008	
164	Not-for-Profit Entities: Mergers and Acquisitions—Including an amendment of FASB Statement No. 142	May 2009	
165	Subsequent Events	May 2009	
166	Accounting for Transfers of Financial Assets—an amendment of FASB Statement No. 140	June 2009	
167	Amendments to FASB Interpretation No. 46(R)	June 2009	
168	The FASB Accounting Standards CodificationTM and the Hierarchy of Generally Accepted Accounting Principles—a replacement of FASB Statement No. 162	June 2009	

== Statements of Financial Accounting Concepts ==
Statements of Financial Accounting Concepts are a part of the FASB conceptual framework project. They set fundamental objectives and concepts that FASB will use in developing future U.S. generally accepted accounting principles (GAAP), however, they are not a part of the US GAAP. To date, 8 Concept Statements have been issued. See Concept Statements at the FASB website for more information.

No.	Title	Issue date	Changes
1	Objectives of Financial Reporting by Business Enterprises	November 1978	Superseded by Concept No. 8, Chapter 1
2	Qualitative Characteristics of Accounting Information	May 1980	Superseded by Concept No. 8, Chapter 3
3	Elements of Financial Statements of Business Enterprises	December 1980	Superseded by Concept No. 6
4	Objectives of Financial Reporting by Nonbusiness Organizations	December 1980	Superseded by Concept No. 8
5	Recognition and Measurement in Financial Statements of Business Enterprises	December 1984	Amended December 2021
6	Elements of Financial Statements replacement of FASB Concepts Statement No. 3(incorporating an amendment of FASB Concepts Statements No. 2 and 3)	December 1985	Superseded by Concept No. 8
7	Using Cash Flow Information and Present Value in Accounting Measurements	February 2000	Amended December 2021
8	Conceptual Framework for Financial Reporting	November 2010	Additional chapters added August 2018 and December 2021

== List of FASB Interpretations ==
FASB Interpretations extend or explain existing standards (primarily Statements of Financial Accounting Standards), and are considered part of U.S. Generally accepted accounting principles. As of September 2006, 48 interpretations have been published.
