= ASC 820 =

Accounting Standards Codification 820 or ASC 820, is an American accounting standard in relation to Fair Value Measurements that was issued by the Financial Accounting Standards Board (FASB) of the United States in 2011.

It superseded the standard issued in September 2006, known as Statement of Financial Accounting Standards 157 which defined fair value, established a framework for measuring fair value in generally accepted accounting principles (GAAP), and expanded disclosures about fair value measurements. This statement was effective for financial reporting fiscal periods commencing after November 15, 2007 and the interim periods applicable.

The standard is also known as ASC Topic 820 and is related to the international accounting standard IFRS 13 that also covers Fair Value Measurement.

== Defining "fair value" ==
Paragraph 5 of SFAS No. 157 defines fair value as "the price that would be received to sell an asset or paid to transfer a liability in an orderly transaction between market participants at the measurement date." Of note, this Statement requires consideration of the exit price paid (if liability) or received (if asset) in a hypothetical transaction in an orderly market (i.e., not a forced liquidation or sold under duress).

This Statement also introduces two more concepts to the definition of fair value – the Principal (or Most Advantageous) Market and Highest and Best Use.

Principal (or Most advantageous) Market – Fair Value Measurement assumes the hypothetical transaction occurs in a principal market, "the market in which the reporting entity would sell the asset or transfer the liability with the greatest volume and level of activity for the asset or liability." In the absence of a principal market, the asset or liability is assumed to be transferred in the most advantageous market, "the market in which the reporting entity would sell the asset or transfer the liability with the price that maximizes the amount that would be received for the asset or minimizes the amount that would be paid to transfer the liability, considering transaction costs in the respective market(s)."

Highest and Best Use – Fair Value Measurement assumes the asset is being utilized in a manner that will maximize its value. For example, where a company owns a factory, but the property would have a higher value as a residential lot, the asset should be fair valued as a residential lot.

== Establishing a framework for measuring fair value ==
The concept of the Fair Value Hierarchy is therefore introduced in paragraphs 22 through 31 in SFAS No. 157. To provide the financial statement user with more insight into the valuation techniques and to create comparability among financial statements, SFAS No. 157 requires the fair value assets and liabilities to be allocated to different levels or hierarchies based on the transparencies of the inputs to valuing the assets/liabilities.

Level 1, the highest on the hierarchy, indicates assets/liabilities with the most transparent and tangible valuation techniques. A Level 1 financial instrument typically has quoted prices and active markets – for example, an equity stock. This type of instrument has the most verifiable and reliable fair value measurement.

Level 2 instruments require more involvement in valuing than Level 1 instruments. Level 2 "inputs are inputs other than quoted prices included within Level 1 that are observable for the asset or liability, either directly or indirectly." For example, an interest rate swap uses known, public data, such as interest rates and the contract terms can be used to calculate a value of the interest rate swap. The instrument can be valued indirectly using observable data. Another example would be using quoted prices for similar assets or liabilities in active markets.

Level 3 is the most unobservable of the levels and indicates use of valuation techniques and data that may not be verifiable. These types of instruments involve a great deal of assumptions and estimates. Examples may include infrequently traded asset backed securities or investments in privately owned companies

== Expanding disclosures ==
SFAS No. 157, paragraph 32 requires two main types of disclosures – a Fair Value Balance Sheet and a Level 3 Rollforward.

The Fair Value Balance Sheet is similar to a typical balance sheet by disclosing the value of the assets and liabilities as of a specific date. However, the Fair Value Balance Sheet only includes financial instruments and uses fair value (concept defined above) as of a specific date. Additionally, the Fair Value Balance Sheet is segregated into the three fair value hierarchies described above – Level 1, Level 2, and Level 3.

The Level 3 Rollforward reconciles the Level 3 balances for assets and liabilities from the prior reporting period to the current reporting period. This reconciliation must include the total gains and losses (realized and unrealized) for the period, the purchase, sales, issuances, and settlements (net), the transfers in and/or out of Level 3. These components should reconcile the prior period’s balance to the current period’s balance.

These are the two main tables disclosed, but additional information is required such as description of the valuation techniques, significant transfers between levels, etc. Additionally, various regulatory bodies, such as the U.S. Securities and Exchange Commission (SEC), American Institute of Certified Public Accountants (AICPA), and other groups within the FASB, will issue further guidelines on SFAS No. 157 disclosures.

== See also ==
- Mark-to-market accounting#FAS 157 / Accounting Standards Codification Topic 820
