= Currency analytics =

Foreign exchange market

Currency analytics comprise the framework, technology and tools that enable global companies to manage the risk associated with currency volatility. Currency analytics often involve automation that helps companies access and validate currency exposure data and make decisions that mitigate foreign exchange risk.

== Currency analytics and risk management ==
Companies that do business in more than one currency are exposed to exchange rate risk – that is, changes in the value of one currency versus another. Exchange rate risk (also known as foreign exchange risk, risk, or currency risk ) is especially high in periods of high currency volatility. This volatility can impact a company's balance sheet and/or cash flow: Corporate currency analytics help companies manage currency risk in both areas.

=== Balance sheet risk ===
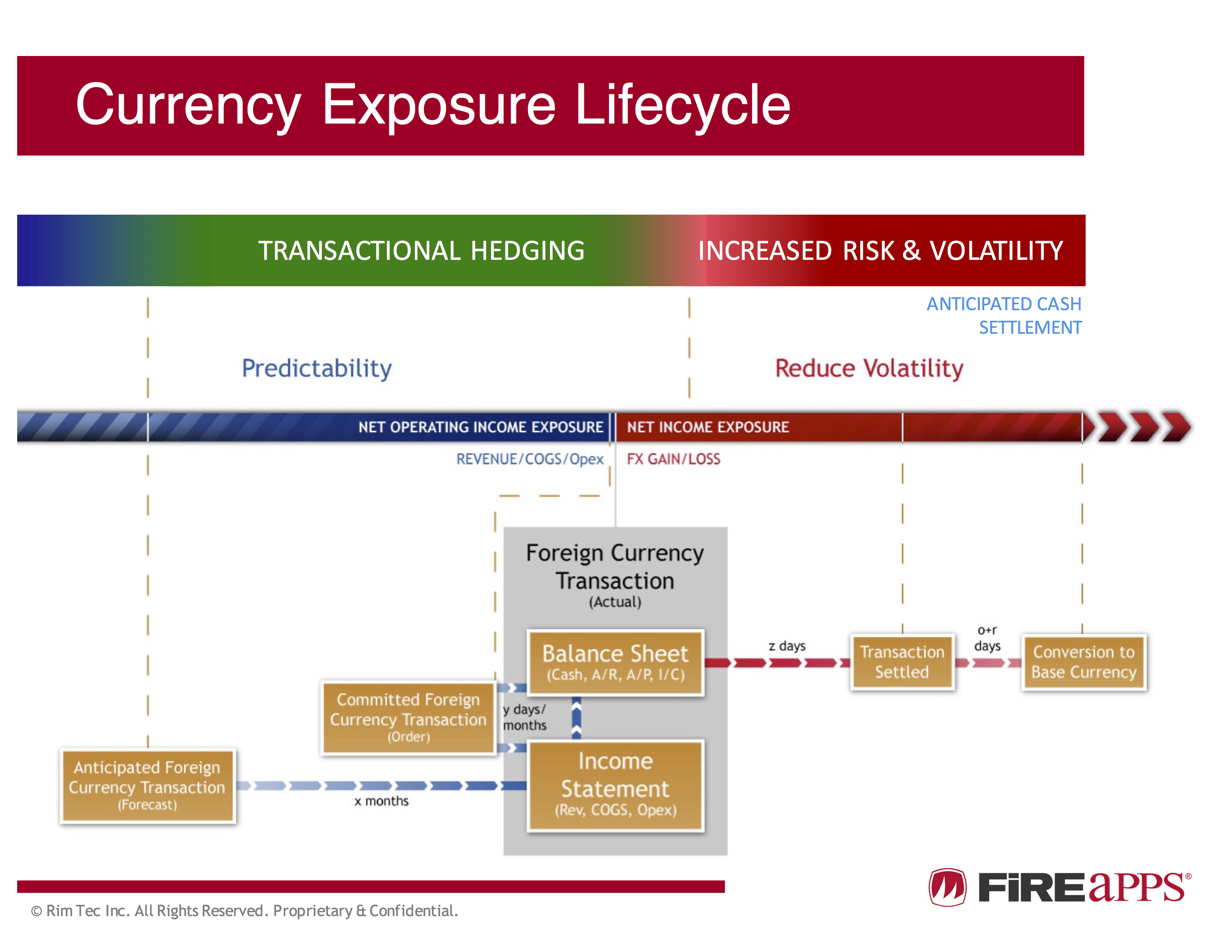
Currency Exposure Lifecycle

In the process of remeasuring transaction currency monetary assets and liability account balances, the difference between the exchange rate when the transaction was posted and exchange rate when the transaction was cleared goes to the functional entity's income statement as an FX gain or loss. Then in the process of translating the functional entity's income statement for the reporting entity's consolidated income statement, that FX gain/loss gets translated at current income statement rate to reporting currency and appears on the consolidated income statement.

Managing balance sheet risk can involve organic (natural) hedging such as using cash positions or intercompany loans to create exposure offsets. It can also involve external hedging such as buying a forward contract to offset FX exposure. See Foreign exchange hedge and Foreign exchange derivative § Instruments.

In both cases, efficient hedging depends on being able to drill down into the balance sheet to see the currencies of the transactions sitting on the company's books around the world. Currency analytics automates that drill-down process and presents balance sheet exposure data in an easy-to-use dashboard that allows companies to efficiently manage balance sheet risk and minimize FX gain/loss.

=== Cash flow risk ===
In the process of translating the functional entity's income statement, revenue, cost of goods sold (COGS), and operating expenses (OpEx) get translated at the current income statement rate to reporting currency and appear on the consolidated income statement. Currency impact to revenue, COGS, and OpEx arises from differences between the current income statement rate and the forecasted rate.

Managing cash flow risk is fundamentally about protecting the economic value of the company's future flow of cash from being eroded by currency volatility. It can involve organic (natural) hedging such as pricing contracts in a particular currency. It can also involve external hedging, but accounting rules require matching hedges to forecasted cash flows and don't allow hedging economic risk.

Currency analytics allow companies to mitigate cash flow risk by uncovering accounting exposures to match the economic exposures so the company can hedge the accounting exposure as a proxy. Currency analytics enable "what/if" scenario analysis so companies can model how volatility in particular currencies could impact their revenue and expenses in the future.
