= Mark to model =

Mark-to-Model refers to the practice of pricing a position or portfolio at prices determined by financial models, in contrast to allowing the market to determine the price. Often the use of models is necessary where a market for the financial product is not available, such as with complex financial instruments. One shortcoming of Mark-to-Model is that it gives an artificial illusion of liquidity, and the actual price of the product depends on the accuracy of the financial models used to estimate the price. On the other hand it is argued that Asset managers and Custodians have a real problem valuing illiquid assets in their portfolios even though many of these assets are perfectly sound and the asset manager has no intention of selling them. Assets should be valued at mark to market prices as required by the Basel rules. However mark to market prices should not be used in isolation, but rather compared to model prices to test their validity. Models should be improved to take into account the greater amount of market data available. New methods and new data are available to help improve models and these should be used. In the end all prices start off from a model.

== Hedge Funds ==
Hedge funds may use mark-to-model for the illiquid portion of their book.

Another shortcoming of mark-to-model is that even if the pricing models are accurate during typical market conditions there can be periods of market stress and illiquidity where the price of less liquid securities declines significantly, for instance through the widening of their bid-ask spread.

The failure of Long-Term Capital Management, in 1998, is a well-known example where the markets were shaken by the Russian financial crisis, causing the price of corporate bonds and treasury bonds to get out of line for a period longer than expected by the LTCM's models. This situation caused the hedge fund to melt down, and required a Fed bailout to prevent the toxicity from spilling into other financial markets.

== Enron Collapse ==
The collapse of Enron is a well-known example of the risks and abuses of Mark-to-Model pricing of Futures contracts. Many of Enron's contracts were difficult to value since these products were not publicly traded, thus computer models were used to generate prices. When Enron's profits began to fall with increased competition, accounts manipulated the mark-to-market models to put a positive spin on Enron's earnings.

== Criticism ==
In 2003, Warren Buffett criticised mark-to-model pricing techniques in the derivatives market for bringing on "large scale mischief" and degenerating into "mark-to-myth".

== See also ==
- Arbitrage-Free Model
- Mark to market
- Model risk
