= Fair value =

Financial estimation of potential market price

In economics and accounting, fair value is a rational and unbiased estimate of the potential market price of a good, service, or asset. The derivation takes into account such objective factors as the costs associated with production or replacement, market conditions and matters of supply and demand. Subjective factors may also be considered such as the risk characteristics, the cost of and return on capital, and individually perceived utility.

== Economic understanding ==
=== Market price ===
There are two schools of thought about the relation between the market price and fair value in any form of market, but especially with regard to tradable assets:

- The efficient-market hypothesis asserts that, in a well organized, reasonably transparent market, the market price is generally equal to or close to the fair value, as investors react quickly to incorporate new information about relative scarcity, utility, or potential returns in their bids; see also Rational pricing.
- Behavioral finance asserts that the market price often diverges from fair value because of various, common cognitive biases among buyers or sellers. However, even proponents of behavioral finance generally acknowledge that behavioral anomalies that may cause such a divergence often do so in ways that are unpredictable, chaotic, or otherwise difficult to capture in a sustainable profitable trading strategy, especially when accounting for transaction costs.

=== Market value ===
The latest edition of International Valuation Standards (IVS 2017), clearly distinguishes between fair value (now referred to as "equitable value"), as defined in the IVS, and market value, as defined in the IVS:

So as the term is generally used, Fair Value can be clearly distinguished from Market Value. It requires the assessment of the price that is fair between two specific parties taking into account the respective advantages or disadvantages that each will gain from the transaction. Although Market Value may meet these criteria, this is not necessarily always the case. Fair Value is frequently used when undertaking due diligence in corporate transactions, where particular synergies between the two parties may mean that the price that is fair between them is higher than the price that might be obtainable on the wider market. In other words Special Value may be generated. Market Value requires this element of Special Value to be disregarded, but it forms part of the assessment of Fair Value.

== Accounting ==
In accounting, fair value reflects the market value of an asset (or liability) for which price on an active market may or may not be determinable. Under US GAAP (ASC 820 formerly FAS 157) and International Financial Reporting Standards (IFRS 13), fair value is the price that would be received to sell an asset or paid to transfer a liability in an orderly transaction between market participants at the measurement date. This is used for assets whose carrying value is based on mark-to-market valuations; for assets carried at historical cost, the fair value of the asset is not recognized.

- Determining fair value for an item traded on an active market such as a security (stock, bond, derivative, etc.), industrial commodity (natural gas, crude oil, copper, etc.) or agricultural commodity (sugar, wheat, pork cutouts, etc.) is straight forward. Fair value simply equals market value on the measurement date (see level one fair value below).
- Determining fair value for an item (initially) sold on a market but not (subsequently) traded on an active market (a car, truck, machine, computer, dishwasher, etc.) is more difficult as it requires assessing not only the item's specifications, age and condition but also market conditions (see level two fair value below).
- Determining fair value for an item neither (initially) sold on a market nor (subsequently) traded on an active market (for example a custom built production line or family residence) is much more difficult and requires assessing "unobservable inputs" (see level three fair value below).
- An example of where fair value is very difficult to determine would be a college kitchen with a cost of $2 million which was built five years ago. If the owners wanted to put a fair value measurement on the kitchen it would be a subjective estimate because there is no active market for such items or items similar to it.
- In another example, if ABC Corporation purchased a two-acre tract of land in 1980 for $1 million, then a historical-cost financial statement would still record the land at $1 million on ABC's balance sheet. If XYZ purchased a similar two-acre tract of land in 2005 for $2 million, then XYZ would report an asset of $2 million on its balance sheet. Even if the two pieces of land were virtually identical, ABC would report an asset with one-half the value of XYZ's land; historical cost is unable to identify that the two items are similar. This problem is compounded when numerous assets and liabilities are reported at historical cost, leading to a balance sheet that may be greatly undervalued. If, however, ABC and XYZ reported financial information using fair-value accounting, then both would report an asset of $2 million. The fair-value balance sheet provides information for investors who are interested in the current value of assets and liabilities, not the historical cost.

=== Fair value measurements (United States markets) ===
The Financial Accounting Standards Board (FASB) issued Statement of Financial Accounting Standards No. 157: Fair Value Measurements ("FAS 157") in September 2006 to provide guidance about how entities should determine fair value estimations for financial reporting purposes. FAS 157 broadly applies to financial and nonfinancial assets and liabilities measured at fair value under other authoritative accounting pronouncements. However, application to nonfinancial assets and liabilities was deferred until 2009. Absence of one single consistent framework for applying fair value measurements and developing a reliable estimate of a fair value in the absence of quoted prices has created inconsistencies and incomparability. The goal of this framework is to eliminate the inconsistencies between balance sheet (historical cost) numbers and income statement (fair value) numbers.

Along with all other standards, FAS 157 was codified FASB Accounting Standards Codification as (ASC) Topic 820 (Fair Value Measurement), which defines fair value as "The price that would be received to sell an asset or paid to transfer a liability in an orderly transaction between market participants at the measurement date." This is sometimes referred to as "exit value". In the futures market, fair value is the equilibrium price for a futures contract. This is equal to the spot price after taking into account compounded interest (and dividends lost because the investor owns the futures contract rather than the physical stocks) over a certain period of time. On the other side of the balance sheet the fair value of a liability is the amount at which that liability could be incurred or settled in a current transaction.

Topic 820 emphasizes the use of market inputs in estimating the fair value for an asset or liability. Quoted prices, credit data, yield curve, etc. are examples of market inputs described by Topic 820. Quoted prices are the most accurate measurement of fair value; however, many times an active market does not exist so other methods have to be used to estimate the fair value on an asset or liability. Topic 820 emphasizes that assumptions used to estimate fair value should be from the perspective of an unrelated market participant. This necessitates identification of the market in which the asset or liability trades. If more than one market is available, Topic 820 requires the use of the "most advantageous market". Both the price and costs to do the transaction must be considered in determining which market is the most advantageous market.

Specifically ASC 820-10-35-24A outlines valuation techniques (approaches): the market approach, cost approach, and income approach. The inputs for the techniques, in hierarchical (ASC 820-10-35-37) order, are broken down into three levels.

Level 1 inputs (ASC 820-10-35-40 to 46) "quoted prices (unadjusted) in active markets for identical assets or liabilities that the reporting entity can access at the measurement date." This implies that the item being evaluated is traded on an active market. An example would be a stock trade on the New York Stock Exchange. Information at this level is based on direct observations of transactions involving the identical assets or liabilities being valued, not assumptions, and thus offers superior reliability. However, relatively few items, especially physical assets, actually trade in active markets. If available, a quoted market price in an active market for identical assets or liabilities should be used. To use this level, the entity must have access to an active market for the item being valued. In many circumstances, quoted market prices are unavailable. If a quoted market price is not available, preparers should make an estimate of fair value using the best information available in the circumstances. The resulting fair value estimate would then be classified in Level Two or Level Three.

Level 2 inputs (ASC 820-10-35-47 to 51A) "inputs other than quoted prices included within Level 1 that are observable for the asset or liability, either directly or indirectly." This is valuation based on market observables. FASB acknowledged that active markets for identical assets and liabilities are relatively uncommon and, even when they do exist, they may be too thin to provide reliable information. To deal with this shortage of direct data, the board provided a second level of inputs that can be applied in three situations: The first involves less-active markets for identical assets and liabilities; this category is ranked lower because the market consensus about value may not be strong. The second arises when the owned assets and owed liabilities are similar to, but not the same as, those traded in a market. In this case, the reporting company has to make some assumptions about what the fair value of the reported items might be in a market. The third situation exists when no active or less-active markets exist for similar assets and liabilities, but some observable market data is sufficiently applicable to the reported items to allow the fair values to be estimated.

For instance, the price of an option based on Black–Scholes and market implied volatility. Within this level, fair value is estimated using a valuation technique. Significant assumptions or inputs used in the valuation technique requires the use of inputs that are observable in the market. Examples of observable market inputs include: quoted prices for similar assets, interest rates, yield curve, credit spreads, prepayment speeds, etc. In addition, assumptions used in estimating fair value must be assumptions that an unrelated party would use in estimating fair value. Notably, FASB indicates that assumptions enter into models that use Level 2 inputs, a condition that reduces the precision of the outputs (estimated fair values), but nonetheless produces reliable numbers that are representationally faithful, verifiable and neutral.

Level 3 inputs (ASC 820-10-35-52 to 54A) "unobservable inputs for the asset or liability." Both level 1 and level 2 inputs are objective, in that they are observable. In contrast, level 3 inputs are subjective, often relying on an entity's own, internally generated data. "A reporting entity shall develop unobservable inputs using the best information available in the circumstances, which might include the reporting entity’s own data." (ASC 820-10-35-54A). However, although the entity uses its own data, the estimate must continue to reflect how an unrelated market participant would use this unobservable data to determine fair value. Specifically: "unobservable inputs shall reflect the assumptions that market participants would use when pricing the asset or liability, including assumptions about risk" (ASC 820-10-35-53). Thus, when using its own, internally generated data, an entity must proceed in an unbiased and neutral way, rather than trying to cast the data in the best (or worst) possible light. Consequently, whenever level 3 inputs are used, both the company's management and independent auditor must take great care to not allow bias to color their assessments.

FASB explains that “observable inputs” are gathered from sources other than the reporting company and that they are expected to reflect assumptions made by market participants. In contrast, “unobservable inputs” are not based on independent sources but on “the reporting entity’s own assumptions about the assumptions market participants would use.” The entity may only rely on internal information if the cost and effort to obtain external information is too high. In addition, financial instruments must have an input that is observable over the entire term of the instrument. While internal inputs are used, the objective remains the same: estimate fair value using assumptions a third party would consider in estimating fair value. Also known as mark to management. Despite being “assumptions about assumptions,” Level 3 inputs can provide useful information about fair values (and thus future cash flows) when they are generated legitimately and with best efforts, without any attempt to bias users’ decisions.

ASC 820-10-55 provides additional guidance on how to apply the valuation techniques (approaches).

A market approach "uses prices and other relevant information generated by market transactions involving identical or comparable (that is, similar) assets, liabilities, or a group of assets and liabilities" Both level one and level two inputs can be used with this approach.

A cost approach "reflects the amount that would be required currently to replace the service capacity of an asset (often referred to as current replacement cost)." While level 1 inputs could be used, level 2 inputs are more common. For example, a company could estimate the fair value of a three year old vehicle by evaluating the blue book price for similar, three year old vehicles. Likewise, level 3 inputs could also be used. For example, a company could estimate the fair value of a production line by estimating the cost of replacing that production line by adding up parts (including purchased equipment and machines), labor, services such as designers, and all other costs associated with acquiring this type of asset.

An income approach "converts future amounts (for example, cash flows or income and expenses) to a single current (that is, discounted) amount." Unlike the previous two techniques, the income approach relies almost exclusively on level three inputs (although exception include models such as the Black-Scholes-Merton or lattice models which also use level 1 and 2 inputs). Converting future cash flows to a current amount requires discounting. In general, there are two methods that can be used: the risk adjusted discount rate method (a.k.a. discount rate adjustment technique) and a risk adjusted cash flow method (a.k.a. expected cash flow or Con 7 method, named after Statement of Financial Accounting Concepts 7 which introduced it into US GAAP). In addition, ASC 820-10-55-3G.c also mentions the multiperiod excess earnings method. Of all the valuation techniques, this is the most subjective as it requires estimating what earnings would be if an asset (most often an intangible asset) had not been acquired, comparing them to earnings if the asset had been acquired, and discounting the difference (taking into account the associated risks).

The FASB, after extensive discussions, has concluded that fair value is the most relevant measure for financial instruments. In its deliberations of Statement 133, the FASB revisited that issue and again renewed its commitment to eventually measuring all financial instruments at fair value.

FASB published a staff position brief on October 10, 2008, in order to clarify the provision in case of an illiquid market.

=== International standards (IFRS) ===
IFRS 13, Fair Value Measurement, was adopted by the International Accounting Standards Board on May 12, 2011. IFRS 13 provides guidance for how to perform fair value measurement under IFRS and became effective on January 1, 2013. The guidance has been converged with US GAAP. IFRS defines fair value as "The price that would be received to sell an asset or paid to transfer a liability in an orderly transaction between market participants at the measurement date." As a result, IFRS 13 requires entities to consider the effects of credit risk when determining a fair value measurement, e.g. by calculating a credit valuation adjustment (CVA) or debit valuation adjustment (DVA) on their derivatives; see XVA § Accounting impact

While ASC 820 and IFRS 15 have been converged and so provide comparable guidance, US GAAP and IFRS apply this guidance in different ways. For example, under US GAAP (ASC 360), entities are not allowed present any property, plant or equipment at fair value. Under IFRS, IAS 16 allows entities to choose between a cost (IAS 16.30) and revaluation (IAS 16.31 to 42) model. If an entity applies the revaluation model, it will measure and report its property plant and equipment at fair value on its balance sheet. It will report the changes in fair value in comprehensive income and accumulate them as a "revaluation surplus" in equity. With respect to investment property (real property held for rent or sale), IFRS takes an additional step. IAS 40.32 requires all entities to measure investment property at fair value. An entity may choose to report this fair value on its balance sheet (fair value model) or disclose it in the footnotes (cost model). If the entity chooses to apply the fair value model, "A gain or loss arising from a change in the fair value of investment property shall be recognised in profit or loss for the period in which it arises." (IAS 40.35). Depending on the choices made, the financial results of an entity applying IFRS may significantly differ from the financial results of an otherwise comparable entity applying US GAAP.

== See also ==
- Deprival value
- Fair value accounting
- Tax amortization benefit
- Valuation risk
