= Accounting Standards Codification =

Source of U.S. Generally Accepted Accounting Principles

In US accounting practices, the Accounting Standards Codification (ASC) is the current single source of United States Generally Accepted Accounting Principles (GAAP). It is maintained by the Financial Accounting Standards Board (FASB).

== FASB accounting standards codification ==
The codification is effective for interim and annual periods ending after September 15, 2009. All prior accounting standards documents were superseded as described in FASB Statement No. 168, The FASB Accounting Standards Codification and the Hierarchy of Generally Accepted Accounting Principles. Accounting literature not included in the Codification is non-authoritative.

The Codification reorganizes the thousands of U.S. GAAP pronouncements into roughly 90 accounting topics and displays all topics using a consistent structure. It also includes relevant U.S. Securities and Exchange Commission (SEC) guidance that follows the same topical structure in separate sections in the Codification.

To prepare constituents for the change, the FASB provided a number of tools and training resources.

The Codification did not change GAAP, but it introduced a new structure, organized in an easily accessible, user-friendly online research system. The Codification is publicly available. The FASB expected the system to reduce the amount of time and effort required to research accounting issues, mitigate the risk of noncompliance with standards through improved usability of the literature, provide accurate information with real-time updates as new standards are released, and assist the FASB with the research efforts required during the standard-setting process.

== Goal ==
The three primary goals of the codification are "simplify user access by codifying all authoritative U.S. GAAP in one spot, ensure that the codification content accurately represented authoritative U.S. GAAP as of July 1, 2009, and to create a codification research system that is up-to-date for the released results of standard-setting activity." The codification was made to make accounting standards easier to find through a single database.

== Leading up to the codification process ==
Before the Codification, accounting standards lacked a consistent and logical structure. For the last 50 years, U.S. GAAP consisted of thousands of standards with multiple standard setters. The old U.S. GAAP were difficult to interpret, and the complexity of the standards made it hard for users to stay up to date. Problems with the old standards increased financial reporting risk and led to inefficiencies that increased cost. The Financial Accounting Standards Advisory Council then voiced its concerns due to the increase of financial reporting guidance from the old U.S. GAAP standards, and the FASB responded by launching a new project to codify the standards. The project was approved in September 2004 by the Trustees of the Financial Accounting Foundation.

== Public access to codification ==
All users must register to view any codification information. The codification allows a free basic view or paid professional view to the public. The professional view requires an annual subscription up to $940 depending on concurrent users. Discounts may apply to multiple concurrent users. The codification is used by accounting and reporting professionals, analysts and investors.

== Structure ==
Each ASC reference is structured as a series of four numbers separated by hyphens: a three-digit Topic (the first digit of which represents an Area), a two-digit Subtopic, a two-digit Section, and a two- or three-digit Paragraph.

Topic Series	Area
100	General Principles
200	Presentation
300	Assets
400	Liabilities
500	Equity
600	Revenue
700	Expenses
800	Broad Transactions
900	Industry

Subtopic 10 is always "Overall."

Section numbers are standardized across topics (not all subtopics have all sections):

Section number	Section title
00	Status
05	Overview and Background
10	Objectives
15	Scope and Scope Exceptions
20	Glossary
25	Recognition
30	Initial Measurement
35	Subsequent Measurement
40	Derecognition
45	Other Presentation Matters
50	Disclosure
55	Implementation Guidance and Illustrations
60	Relationships
65	Transition and Open Effective Date Information
70	Grandfathered Guidance
75	XBRL Elements

For instance, 210-10-20 is Balance Sheet, Overall, Glossary. 605-40-25-1 is Revenue Recognition, Gains and Losses, Recognition, first paragraph.

== See also ==
- ASC 820
- List of FASB pronouncements
