= Historical cost =

Original monetary value of an item

The historical cost of an asset at the time it is acquired or created is the value of the costs incurred in acquiring or creating the asset, comprising the consideration paid to acquire or create the asset plus transaction costs. Historical cost accounting involves reporting assets and liabilities at their historical costs, which are not updated for changes in the items' values. Consequently, the amounts reported for these balance sheet items often differ from their current economic or market values.

While use of historical cost measurement is criticised for its lack of timely reporting of value changes, it remains in use in most accounting systems during periods of low and high inflation and deflation. During hyperinflation, International Financial Reporting Standards (IFRS) require financial capital maintenance in units of constant purchasing power in terms of the monthly CPI as set out in IAS 29, Financial Reporting in Hyperinflationary Economies. Various adjustments to historical cost are used, many of which require the use of management judgment and may be difficult to verify. The trend in most accounting standards is towards more timely reflection of the fair or market value of some assets and liabilities, although the historical cost principle remains in use. Many accounting standards require disclosure of current values for certain assets and liabilities in the footnotes to the financial statements instead of reporting them on the balance sheet.

For some types of assets with readily available market values, standards require that the carrying value of an asset (or liability) be updated to the market price or some other estimate of value that approximates current value (fair value, also fair market value). Accounting standards vary as to how the resultant change in value of an asset or liability is recorded; it may be included in income or as a direct change to shareholders' equity.

The capital maintenance in units of constant purchasing power model is an International Accounting Standards Board approved alternative basic accounting model to the traditional historical cost accounting model.

== Historical cost basis (original cost) ==
Under the historical cost basis of accounting, assets and liabilities are recorded at their values when first acquired. They are not then generally restated for changes in values.

Costs recorded in the Income Statement are based on the historical cost of items sold or used, rather than their replacement costs.

For example,

- a company acquires an asset in year 1 for $100
- the asset is still held at the end of year 1, when its market value is $120
- the company sells the asset in year 2 for $115

At the end year 1 the asset is recorded in the balance sheet at cost of $100. No account is taken of the increase in value from $100 to $120 in year 1. In year 2 the company records a sale of $115. The cost of sales is $100, being the historical cost of the asset. This gives rise to a gain of $15 which is wholly recognized in year 2.

== Measurement under the historical cost basis ==
=== Inventory ===
It is standard under the historical cost basis to report the cost of inventory (stock) at the lower of cost and net realisable value. As a result:-

- A decrease in the realisable value of inventory to an amount below its historical cost is recognised immediately
- An increase in the realisable value of inventory is not recognised until the inventory is sold.

=== Property, plant and equipment ===
Property, plant and equipment is recorded at its historical cost. Cost includes:-

- Purchase price, including import duties and non-refundable purchase taxes, after deducting trade discounts and rebates;
- Any costs directly attributable to bringing the asset to the location and condition necessary for it to be capable of operating. These can include site preparation, delivery and handling costs, installation, assembly, testing, professional fees and the costs of employees directly involved in these activities.

In IFRS, cost also includes the initial estimate of the costs of dismantling and removing the item and restoring it. Cost may include the cost of borrowing to finance construction if this policy is consistently adopted. The historical cost is then depreciated: it is systematically reduced to the recoverable amount, over the estimated useful life of the asset, to reflect the asset's usage. The depreciation (reduction of historical cost) is charged to expense. In most cases the "straight line" depreciation method is used, resulting in the same depreciation charge each year until it is expected to be sold or no further economic benefits obtained from it. Other patterns of depreciation are used if assets are used proportionately more in some periods than others.

=== Financial instruments ===
Certain financial items may be recorded at historical cost which is the basic method of financial accounting. Any initial issue premium or discount is amortized to interest over time, and the resulting value is often described as amortized cost.

== Exceptions to the historical cost basis of accounting ==
=== Revaluation of property, plant and equipment ===
Under IFRS it is acceptable, but not required, to re-measure the values of property, plant and equipment at their fair (current) values. 'Fair value' is the amount for which an asset could be exchanged, or a liability settled, between knowledgeable, willing parties in an arm's length transaction. Such a policy must be applied to all assets of a particular class. It would therefore be acceptable for an entity to revalue freehold properties every three years. The revaluations must be made with sufficient regularity to ensure that the carrying value does not differ materially from market value in subsequent years. A surplus on revaluation would be recorded as a reserve movement, not as income.

=== Derivative financial instruments ===
Under IFRS and US GAAP derivative financial instruments are reported at fair value, with value changes recorded in the income statement.

=== Financial reporting in hyperinflationary economies ===
IFRS requires IAS 29 Financial Reporting in Hyperinflationary Economies which prescribes capital maintenance in units of constant purchasing power in currencies deemed to be hyperinflationary. The characteristics of a hyperinflation include the population keeping its wealth in non-monetary assets or relatively stable foreign currencies, prices quoted in foreign currencies or widespread indexation of prices. This might arise if cumulative inflation reaches or exceeds 100% over three years. An entity operating in a hyperinflationary economy:-

- Records a gain or loss on its 'net monetary position' in its income statement.
- Records non-monetary items (for example, property, plant & equipment) in the balance sheet by applying indexation to their historical cost.

=== Management accounting techniques ===
In management accounting there are a number of techniques used as alternatives to historical cost accounting, including:-

- measuring profit on sale of inventory by reference to its replacement cost. If inventory with a historical cost of $100 is sold for $115 when it costs $110 to replace it, the profit recorded would be $5 only based on replacement cost, not $15;
- charging economic rent for assets, particularly property. If a business uses a 20-year-old property which it owns, depreciation on a historical cost basis might be insignificant. However, the management accounts could show a notional rent payable, being perhaps opportunity cost - the amount the business could receive if it let the property to a third party.

== IASB approved alternative to historical cost accounting ==
The IASB's Framework introduced Capital Maintenance in Units of Constant Purchasing Power as an alternative to Historical Cost Accounting in 1989 in Par. 104 (a) where it states that financial capital maintenance can be measured in either nominal monetary units - the traditional HCA model - or in units of constant purchasing power at all levels of inflation and deflation: the CMUCPP model.

The specific choice of measuring financial capital maintenance in units of constant purchasing power (the CMUCPP model) at all levels of inflation and deflation as contained in the Framework for the Preparation and Presentation of Financial Statements, was approved by the International Accounting Standards Board's predecessor body, the International Accounting Standards Committee Board, in April 1989 for publication in July 1989 and adopted by the IASB in April 2001.

"In the absence of a Standard or an Interpretation that specifically applies to a transaction, management must use its judgement in developing and applying an accounting policy that results in information that is relevant and reliable. In making that judgement, IAS 8.11 requires management to consider the definitions, recognition criteria, and measurement concepts for assets, liabilities, income, and expenses in the Framework. This elevation of the importance of the Framework was added in the 2003 revisions to IAS 8."

IAS8, 11:

"In making the judgement, management shall refer to, and consider the applicability of, the following sources in descending order:

(a) the requirements and guidance in Standards and Interpretations dealing with similar and related issues; and

(b) the definitions, recognition criteria and measurement concepts for assets, liabilities, income and expenses in the Framework."

There is no applicable International Financial Reporting Standard or Interpretation regarding the valuation of constant real value non-monetary items, e.g. issued share capital, retained earnings, capital reserves, all other items in Shareholders Equity, trade debtors, trade creditors, deferred tax assets and liabilities, taxes payable and receivable, all other non-monetary receivables and payables, Profit and Loss account items such as salaries, wages, rents, etc. The Framework is thus applicable.

The CMUCPP model is chosen by hardly any accountant in non-hyperinflationary economies even though it would automatically maintain the real value of constant real value non-monetary items, e.g. issued share capital, retained income, other shareholder equity items, trade debtors, trade creditors, etc., constant for an unlimited period of time in all entities that at least in real value at all levels of inflation and deflation - all else being equal. This is because the CMUCPP model is generally viewed by accountants as a 1970s failed inflation accounting model that requires all non-monetary items - variable real value non-monetary items and constant real value non-monetary items - to be inflation-adjusted by means of the Consumer Price Index.

The IASB did not approve CMUCPP in 1989 as an inflation accounting model. CMUCPP by measuring financial capital maintenance in units of constant purchasing power incorporates an alternative capital concept, financial capital maintenance concept and profit determination concept to the Historical Cost capital concept, financial capital maintenance concept and profit determination concept. CMUCPP requires all constant real value non-monetary items, e.g. issued share capital, retained income, all other items in Shareholders Equity, trade debtors, trade creditors, deferred tax assets and liabilities, taxes payable and receivable, all items in the profit and loss account, etc. to be valued in units of constant purchasing power on a daily basis. Variable real value non-monetary items, e.g. property, plant, equipment, listed and unlisted shares, inventory, etc. are valued in terms of IFRS and updated daily.

The IASB requires entities to implement IAS 29 which is a Capital Maintenance in Units of Constant Purchasing Power model during hyperinflation.

== Advantages and disadvantages of historical cost accounting ==
Advantages

- Historical cost accounts are straightforward to produce
- Historical cost accounts do not record gains until they are realized
- Historical cost accounts are still used in most accounting systems

Disadvantages

- Historical cost accounts give no indication of current values of the assets of a business
- Historical cost accounts do not record the opportunity costs of the use of older assets, particularly property which may be recorded at a value based on costs incurred many years ago
- Historical cost accounts do not report/account the loss of real value of nominal monetary items as a result of inflation or the gain in real value in nominal monetary items during deflation.

== See also ==
- Constant Purchasing Power Accounting
- Deprival value
- Fair market value
- Inflation
