= List of AWP Award winners =

The AWP Award is an annual competition for the publication of new book-length works.

The Association of Writers & Writing Programs (AWP) is a nonprofit organization of writers, teachers, colleges, and universities. The Donald Hall Prize for Poetry is an award of $5,000 and publication. The Grace Paley Prize for Short Fiction is an award of $5,000 and publication. Winners in the novel and creative nonfiction categories receive a $2,000 cash honorarium and publication. AWP hires a staff of “screeners” who review manuscripts for the judges, who select ten manuscripts in each genre for each judge's final evaluations.

Year	Category	Judge	Winner	Work
2022	Poetry	Naomi Shihab Nye	Sahar Muradi	Octobers, University of Pittsburgh Press
2022	Short Fiction		E.P. Tuazon	Professional Lola, Red Hen Press
2022	Novel	Brandon Hobson	Parul Kapur Hinzen	Inside the Mirror, University of Nebraska Press
2022	Nonfiction	Brian Turner	Jessica Hendry Nelson	Joy Rides Through the Tunnel of Grief: A Memoir, University of Georgia Press
2021	Poetry	Ilya Kaminsky	Paul Hlava Ceballos	banana [ ], University of Pittsburgh Press
2021	Short Fiction	Rebecca Makkai	Daphne Kalotay	Vertigo and Other Stories
2021	Novel	Sabina Murray	Elizabeth Shick	The Golden Land, New Issues Poetry & Prose
2021	Nonfiction	Aimee Nezhukumatathil	Anne-Marie Oomen	As Long as I Know You: The Mom Book, University of Georgia Press
2020	Poetry	Claudia Rankine	Tracy Fuad	about:blank, University of Pittsburgh Press
2020	Short Fiction	Dr. Amina Gautier	John Weir	Your Nostalgia is Killing Me, Red Hen Press
2020	Novel	Salvatore Scibona	Christie Hodgen	Boy Meets Girl, New Issues Press
2020	Nonfiction	Alexander Chee	Caroline Crew	Other Girls to Burn, University of Georgia Press
2019	Poetry	Natasha D. Trethewey	Joy Priest	Horsepower, University of Pittsburgh Press
2019	Short Fiction	Dan Chaon	Cécile Barlier	A Gypsy's Book of Revelation, Red Hen Press
2019	Novel	Bonnie Jo Campbell	Robert Shuster	To Zenzi, New Issues Press
2019	Nonfiction	Debra Monroe	Megan Harlan	Mobile Home: A Memoir in Essays, The University of Georgia Press
2018	Poetry	Ross A. Gay	Rebecca Lehmann	Ringer, University of Pittsburgh Press
2018	Short Fiction	Kelly Link	Zachary Doss	Boy Oh Boy, University of Massachusetts Press
2018	Novel	Paula McLain	Ginger Eager	The Nature of Remains, New Issues Press
2018	Nonfiction	Dinty W. Moore	Steven Moore	The Longer We Were There: A Memoir of a Part-Time Soldier, The University of Georgia Press
2017	Poetry	Kim Addonizio	Brynne Rebele-Henry	Autobiography of a Wound, University of Pittsburgh Press
2017	Short Fiction	Sue Miller	Jon Chopan	Crisis Hotline: Veterans Press I, University of Massachusetts Press
2017	Novel	Zachary Lazar	Joshua Bernstein	Rachel's Tomb, New Issues Press
2017	Nonfiction	Gretel Ehrlich	Wang Ping	Life of Miracles along the Yangtze and Mississippi, The University of Georgia Press
2016	Poetry	Vijay Seshadri	Lauren Clark	Music for a Wedding, University of Pittsburgh Press
2016	Short Fiction	Amy Hempel	Mary Kuryla	Freak Weather Stories, University of Massachusetts Press
2016	Novel	Karen Tei Yamashita	James Janko	The Clubhouse Thief, New Issues Press
2016	Nonfiction	Michael Steinberg	Paisley Rekdal	The Broken Country: On Trauma, A Crime, and the Continuing Legacy of Vietnam, The University of Georgia Press
2015	Poetry	Crystal Ann Williams	Marci Calabretta	Hour of the Ox, University of Pittsburgh Press
2015	Short Fiction	Nahid Rachlin	Eric Neuenfeldt	Wild Horse, University of Massachusetts Press
2015	Novel	Paul Harding	Carol Zoref	Barren Island, New Issues Press
2015	Nonfiction	Lia Purpura	No winner
2014	Poetry	Joy Harjo	Iliana Rocha	Karankawa, University of Pittsburgh Press
2014	Short Fiction	Jaime Manrique	Susan Muaddi Darraj	A Curious Land: Stories from Home, University of Massachusetts Press
2014	Novel	Mary Gaitskill	Charles M. Boyer	History's Child, New Issues Press
2014	Nonfiction	John Phillip Santos	Sarah Einstein	Mot, A Memoir, University of Georgia Press
2013	Poetry	D. A. Powell	Kirsten Kaschock	The Dottery, University of Pittsburgh Press
2013	Short Fiction	Pam Houston	Carla Panciera	Bewildered, University of Massachusetts Press
2013	Novel	Charles Yu	Matthew Burriesci	Nonprofit, New Issues Press
2013	Nonfiction	Bernard Cooper	Sarah Gorham	Study in Perfect, University of Georgia Press
2012	Poetry	Arthur Sze	Joan Naviyuk Kane	Hyperboreal, University of Pittsburgh Press
2012	Short Fiction	Dan Chaon	Lucas Southworth	Everyone Here Has a Gun, University of Massachusetts Press
2012	Novel	Kathryn Davis	Andrew Ladd	What Ends, New Issues Press
2012	Nonfiction	Terry Tempest Williams	Julian Hoffman	The Small Heart of Things: Being at Home in a Beckoning World, University of Georgia Press
2011	Poetry	Dorianne Laux	Laura Read	Instructions for My Mother's Funeral, University of Pittsburgh Press
2011	Short Fiction	Jhumpa Lahiri	Corinna Vallianatos	My Escapee, University of Massachusetts Press
2011	Novel	Don Lee	Kirstin Scott	Motherlunge, New Issues Press
2011	Nonfiction	Susan Orlean	Marcia Aldrich	Companion to an Untold Story, University of Georgia Press
2010	Poetry	Alberto Ríos	Quan Barry	Water Puppets, University of Pittsburgh Press
2010	Short Fiction	Peter Ho Davies	Douglas Light	Girls in Trouble, University of Massachusetts Press
2010	Novel	Francine Prose	Mandy Keifetz	Flea Circus: A Brief Bestiary of Grief, New Issues Press
2010	Nonfiction	Luis Alberto Urrea	Danielle Cadena Deulen	The Riots, University of Georgia Press
2009	Poetry	Jean Valentine	Bradley Paul	The Animals All Are Gathering
2009	Short Fiction	Allan Gurganus	Christine Sneed	Portraits of a Few of the People I've Made Cry
2009	Novel	Jim Shepard	Kevin Fenton	Merit Badges
2009	Nonfiction	Lee Gutkind	David Vann	Last Day on Earth
2008	Poetry	Lynn Emanuel	Beth Bachmann	Temper
2008	Short Fiction	Jewell Parker Rhodes	Ramola D	Temporary Lives & Other Stories
2008	Novel	Joanna Scott	Goldie Goldbloom	Toad's Museum of Freaks and Wonders
2008	Nonfiction	Kathleen Norris	Sonja Livingston	Ghostbread
2007	Poetry	Bob Hicok	Sharon Dolin	Burn and Dodge
2007	Short Fiction	Noy Holland	David Vann	Legend of a Suicide
2007	Novel	Robert Eversz	Scott Blackwood	We Agreed to Meet Just Here
2007	Nonfiction	Michael Martone	Sharon White	Vanished Gardens
2006	Poetry	Terrance Hayes	Angela Ball	Night Clerk at the Hotel of Both Worlds
2006	Short Fiction	Nancy Reisman	Karen Brown	Pins and Needles
2006	Novel	Nicholas Delbanco	Geoff Rips	The Truth
2006	Nonfiction	Kyoko Mori	Mort Zachter	Dough: A Memoir
2005	Poetry	Ha Jin	John Hodgen	Grace
2005	Short Fiction	Ana Menendez	Nona Caspers	Heavier Than Air
2005	Novel	Rikki Ducornet	John Robinson	Dreaming America
2005	Nonfiction	Robin Hemley	J.D. Scrimgeour	Themes for English B
2004	Poetry	Alicia Ostriker	Christopher Bursk	The Improbable Swervings of Atoms
2004	Short Fiction	Douglas Bauer	No winner
2004	Novel	Elizabeth McCracken	M. Evelina Galang	One Tribe
2004	Nonfiction	Suzannah Lessard	David Carkeet	Campus Sexpot
2003	Poetry	Stephen Dunn	Barbara Hamby	Babel
2003	Short Fiction	Joan Silber	Doreen Baingana	Tropical Fish
2003	Novel		No winner
2003	Nonfiction	Beverly Lowry	Karen Salyer McElmurray	Mother of the Disappeared: An Appalachian Birth Mother's Journey
2002	Poetry	Cornelius Eady	Sandra Kohler	The Ceremonies of Longing
2002	Short Fiction	Frederick Busch	Joan Connor	History Lessons
2002	Novel		No winner
2002	Nonfiction	Sue William Silverman	Mark Anderson	Jesus Sound Explosion
2001	Poetry	Marilyn Chin	Gray Jacobik	Brave Disguises
2001	Short Fiction	Frederick Barthelme	Christie Hodgen	A Jeweler’s Eye for Flaw
2001	Novel		No winner
2001	Nonfiction	Barry Sanders	Jill Christman	Darkroom: An Autobiography
2000	Poetry	Li-Young Lee	Joanie V. Mackowski	The Zoo
2000	Short Fiction	Jill McCorkle	Michelle Richmond	The Girl in the Fall-Away Dress
2000	Novel		Alexander Parsons	Leaving Disneyland
2000	Nonfiction	Sven Birkerts	Brian Lennon	City: An Essay
1999	Poetry	Dorianne Laux	Connie Voisine	Cathedral of the North
1999	Short Fiction	Larry Woiwode	C.J. Hribal	The Clouds in Memphis
1999	Novel	Thomas Dunn	Aaron Roy Even	Bloodroot
1999	Nonfiction	Judith Kitchen	Lia Purpura	Increase
1998	Poetry	Marvin Bell	Edward Kleinschmidt Mayes	Works & Days
1998	Short Fiction	Diane Glancy	Bonnie Jo Campbell	Women & Other Animals
1998	Novel	St. Martin's Press	No winner
1998	Nonfiction	Kathleen Norris	Michael Martone	The Flatness & Other Landscapes
1997	Poetry	Arthur Vogelsang	Josie Rawson	Quarry
1997	Short Fiction	Robert Boswell	Toni Graham	The Daiquiri Girls
1997	Novel	St. Martin's Press	No winner
1997	Nonfiction	James Galvin	Peter Chilson	Riding the Demon Road
1996	Poetry	Jorie Graham	Michele Glazer	It Is Hard to Look At What We Came to Think
1996	Short Fiction	George Cuomo	Charlotte Bacon	A Private State'
1996	Nonfiction	Lucy Grealy	Marilyn Moriarty	Moses Unchained
1995	Poetry	Olga Broumas	Rick Noguchi	The Ocean Inside Kenji Takezo
1995	Short Fiction	Lorrie Moore	David Jauss	Black Maps
1995	Novel	Ron Carlson	Steven Bloom	No New Jokes
1995	Nonfiction	Adam Hochschild	Sue William Silverman	Because I Remember Terror, Father, I Remember You
1994	Poetry	William Matthews	Ruth Schwartz	Accordion Breathing and Dancing
1994	Short Fiction	Elizabeth Tallent	A. Manette Ansay	Read This and Tell Me What It Says
1994	Novel	Elizabeth Cox	Tracy Daugherty	What Falls Away
1994	Nonfiction	Patricia Hampl	William Van Wert	Memory Links
1993	Poetry	Carolyn Forché	Reginald Shepherd	Some Are Drowning
1993	Short Fiction	Grace Paley	E. Bumas	Significance
1993	Novel	Josephine Humphreys	Mary Gardner	Boat People
1993	Nonfiction	Phillip Lopate	Michael Stephens	Green Dreams: Under the Influence of the Irish
1992	Poetry	Lucille Clifton	Suzanne Gardinier	The New World
1992	Short Fiction	Bret Lott	Daniel Lyons	The First Snow
1992	Novel	Alison Lurie	William Cobb	The Fire Eaters
1992	Nonfiction	Stanley Lindberg	Fred Setterberg	Unpaved Nations: Travels Through America's Literary Landscapes
1991	Poetry	Ron Wallace (poet)	Betsy Sholl	The Red Line
1991	Short Fiction	Antonya Nelson	Jack Driscoll	Wanting Only to be Heard
1991	Novel	Richard Bausch	No winner
1991	Nonfiction	Scott Russell Sanders	Phyllis Barber	How I Got Cultured
1990	Poetry	Ellen Bryant Voigt	Kathleen Peirce	A Living Room
1990	Short Fiction	Ron Hansen	Karen Brennan	Wild Desire
1990	Novel	Bob Shacochis	Lamar Herrin	The Lies Boys Tell
1990	Nonfiction	Bob Atwan	Philip Garrison	Augury
1989	Poetry	Alice Fulton	Belle Waring	Refuge
1989	Short Fiction	Charles Baxter	Susan Hubbard	Walking on Ice
1988	Poetry	Gerald Stern	Christopher Davis	The Tyrant of the Past
1988	Short Fiction	David Huddle	Roland Sodowsky	Things We Lose
1988	Novel	Toby Olson	Duff Brenna	Mamie Beaver
1988	Nonfiction	Gloria Emerson	Richard Terrill	Saturday Night in Baoding
1987	Poetry	Linda Pastan	Robin Behn	Paper Bird
1987	Short Fiction	François Camoin	Anne Finger	Basic Skills
1987	Novel	John Williams	No winner
1987	Nonfiction	David McKain	Diane Ackerman	Spellbound: Growing Up in God's Country
1986	Poetry	James Whitehead & Dara Wier	Judith Hemschemeyer	The Ride Home
1986	Short Fiction	Robley Wilson, Jr., Irene Skolnick	Jesse Lee Kercheval	The Dogeater: Stories
1986	Novel	George Cuomo	Kenn Robbins	Buttermilk Bottoms
1986	Nonfiction	Irene Skolnick, Robley Wilson, Jr.	No winner
1985	Poetry	John Frederick Nims	No winner
1985	Short Fiction	Ann Beattie	No winner
1985	Novel	Margaret Atwood	Mack Faith	The Warrior's Gift
1985	Nonfiction	Susan Fromberg Schaeffer	Scott R. Sanders	The Paradise of Bombs
1984	Poetry	James Tate	Sandra Alcosser	A Fish to Feed All Hunger
1984	Short Fiction	Paul Bowles	Rod Kessier	Off in Zimbabwe
1984	Novel	George Garrett	William Holinger	The Fence-Walker
1984	Nonfiction	Annie Dillard	Will Baker	Mountain Blood
1983	Poetry	Josephine Jacobsen	Lisa Ress	Flight Patterns
1983	Short Fiction	Donald Barthelme	Charles Baxter	Harmony of the World
1983	Novel	Theodore Solotaroff	Doug Finn	Heart of a Family
1982	Poetry	W.D. Snodgrass	Alice Fulton	Dance Script With Electric Ballerina
1982	Short Fiction	Raymond Carver	Alvin Greenberg	Delta q
1982	Novel	Gail Godwin	John Solensten	Good Thunder
1981	Poetry	William Meredith	Paul Nelson	Days Off
1981	Short Fiction	Stanley Elkin	François Camoin	The End of the World is Los Angeles
1981	Novel	John Irving	No winner
1980	Poetry	Maxine Kumin	William Carpenter	The Hours of Morning
1980	Short Fiction	Joyce Carol Oates	Eugene Garber	Metaphysical Tales
1980	Novel	Hortense Calesher	Mary Elsie Robertson	After Freud
1979	Poetry	Donald Justice	James Applewhite	Following Gravity
1979	Short Fiction	Richard Yates	Ian MacMillan	Light and Power
1978	Poetry	Robert Penn Warren	Jeanne Larsen	James Cook in Search of Terra Incognita
1978	Short Fiction	Wallace Stegner	Rebecca Kavaler	The Further Adventure of Brunhild
1977	Poetry	Elizabeth Bishop	Phyllis Janowitz	Rites of Strangers
1976	Poetry	James Wright	Robert Huff	The Ventriloquist
1975	Poetry	Richard Eberhart	David Walker	Moving Out
