= Doreen Baingana =

Ugandan short story writer and editor (born 1966)

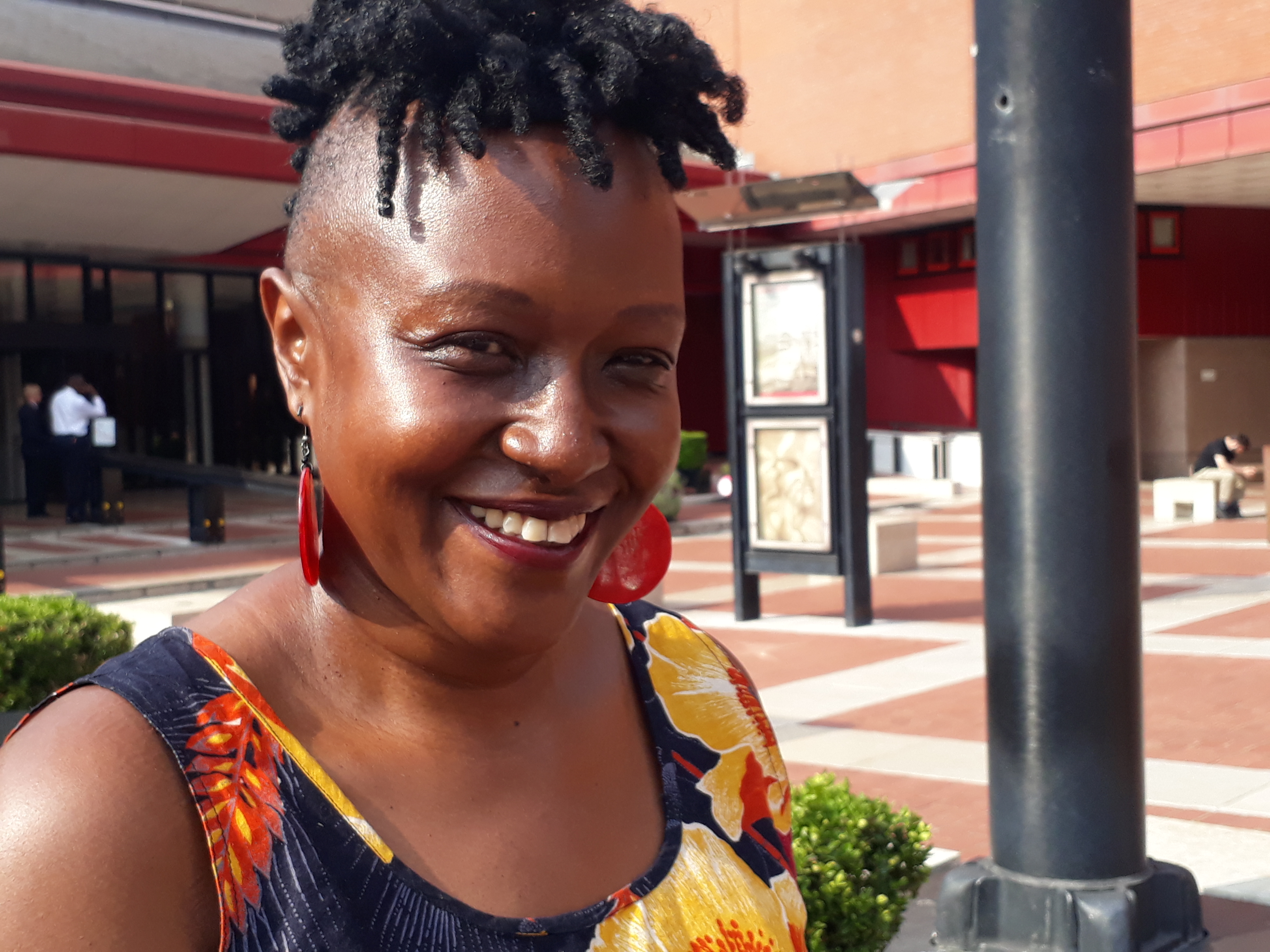
- Born: 1966 (age 59–60); Entebbe, Uganda
- Education: Makerere University and University of Maryland, College Park.
- Occupation: Writer
- Writing career
- Genre: Fiction
- Notable work: Tropical Fish (2005)

Doreen Baingana (born 1966) is a Ugandan writer. Her short story collection, Tropical Fish, won the Grace Paley Award for Short Fiction in 2003 and the Commonwealth Writers' Prize for best first book, Africa Region in 2006. Stories in it were finalists for the Caine Prize in 2004 and 2005. She was a Caine Prize finalist for the third time in 2021 and has received many other awards listed below.

== Early life and education ==
Raised in Entebbe, Doreen Baingana attended Gayaza High School and obtained a law degree from Makerere University and an MFA in creative writing from the University of Maryland, College Park.

Immediately thereafter, she was appointed writer-in-residence at the Jiménez-Porter Writers House. She embarked on a PhD in Creative Writing at the University of Queensland in 2023.

== Career ==
Baingana won the Grace Paley Prize for Short Fiction in 2003 for her collection Tropical Fish. It was published by the University of Massachusetts Press and Broadway Books in the US, Oshun Books in South Africa, and Cassava Republic Press in Nigeria. It has been translated into Swedish and Spanish. It is forthcoming in French. The linked stories, which explore the lives of three sisters growing up in Entebbe after the fall of Idi Amin, have been described by Publishers Weekly as "richly detailed stories" that are "lush with cultural commentary."

Baingana has published two children's books as well as short stories, essays, and articles in numerous journals and magazines including; The Georgia Review, The Evergreen Review, The African American Review, Chelsea, Glimmer Train, Callaloo, Agni, The Caravan: A Journal of Politics and Culture, Transition, The Guardian, Chimurenga, Kwani?, Farafina and Ibua. Her stories have been broadcast on Voice of America and BBC and have been included in many anthologies including Gods and Soldiers: The Penguin Anthology of Contemporary African Writing; The Granta Anthology of African Fiction, Cultural Transformations (OneWorld), New Daughters of Africa (edited by Margaret Busby, 2019). and Joyful, Joyful: Stories Celebrating Black Voices.

Baingana was a contractor with Voice of America for a decade and taught at the Writer's Center, Bethesda, MD before returning to Uganda. She was a managing editor of Storymoja Africa, a Kenyan publisher, and chairperson of FEMRITE, the Uganda Women Writers Association. She co-founded and directs the Mawazo Africa Writing Institute and leads creative writing workshops across Africa.

The title story of Baingana's award-winning collection Tropical Fish has been adapted to the stage and performed at the Kampala International Theatre Festival (KITF 2016) and four other venues in Kampala, as well as the AfriCologne Theatre Festival in Cologne, Germany, in 2017. Another of Baingana's short stories, "Hills of Salt and Sugar", was adapted and staged at KITF 2018.

Baingana has been a judge for prizes including; The Afritondo Short Story Prize, the 9mobile Prize for Literature, the Commonwealth Short Story Prize, the Golden Baobab Prize and the Hurston/Wright Prize for Debut Fiction.

== Awards ==
- 2002: D.C. Commission of the Arts and Humanities Artist's Grant
- 2003: Grace Paley Award for Short Fiction
- 2004, 2005 & 2021: Caine Prize, finalist
- 2004: Bread Loaf Writers Conference Scholar
- 2004: Washington Independent Writers Fiction Prize
- 2005: Bread Loaf Writers Conference Michael and Marylee Fairbanks International Fellow
- 2006: Commonwealth Writers' Prize for a first book, Africa Region (nominated)
- 2006: Hurston/Wright Legacy Award for Debut Fiction, finalist
- 2011: Norman Mailer Center Fellowship in Fiction
- 2014: Miles Morland Scholarship
- 2017: Rockefeller Bellagio Artist's Residency
- 2020: Sustainable Arts Foundation Grant, finalist
- 2020: Tebere Arts Foundation Playwright Residency
- 2021: Sustainable Arts Foundation Grant.
- 2022: La Porte Peinte Residency.
- 2022: The Gretchen J. Bryant Freedom to Write Distinguished Fellowship.

== Published works ==
=== Short-story collection ===
- Tropical Fish: Stories out of Entebbe. University of Massachusetts Press. 2005. ISBN 978-1-55849-477-0.

=== Children's books ===
- Gamba the Gecko Wants to Drum. Storymoja Africa. 2010. ISBN 9789966001115.
- My Fingers are Stuck. Storymoja Africa. 2010. ISBN 9789966001092.

=== Short stories ===
Title	Year	First published	Reprinted/Collected/Broadcast
“Her Generous Body”	2022	The Georgia ReviewPotomac Review,	
“Family is Family"	2022	Joyful, Joyful: Stories Celebrating Black Voices Two Hoots/Pan Macmillan UK	
"Lucky"	2021	Ibua Journal	Evergreen Review, Fall/Winter 2021
"Una Ragazza" ("A Girl")	2018	Grace and Gravity: Fiction by Washington Area Women, Paycock Press, October 2004	As "Holy Shit!", Kwani? 04, 2007
"The Exam"	2014	Broadcast on BBC4, March 2014	
"Gorging"	2013	The Caravan: A Journal of Politics & Culture, India (Online), May 2013	
"Man and Son"	2012	Africa Inside Out, University of Kwazulu-Natal Press, SA, March 2012	
"The Messenger"	2011	Transition, 50th Anniversary edition, November 2011	
"Christianity Killed the Cat	2007	Cain Prize Anthology	**Gods and Soldiers: The Penguin Anthology of Contemporary African** **Writing,** April 2009 -Republished in St. Petersburg Review, 2008 -Republished in Air Uganda Inflight Magazine, Oct. – Dec. 2008
"Anointed"	2010	AGNI, November 2010	Gods and Soldiers: The Air Uganda Inflight Magazine, October–December 2008
"Eden Burning"	2008	Chimurenga 12, March 2008	The Manchester Review, July 2017
"Kadongo Kamu – One Beat"	2005	Story Quarterly, Fall 2005	The Sunday Monitor, February 2006
"One Woman’s Body"	2005	Seventh Street Alchemy, Jacana Press, 2005	Macmillan Anthology of Short Stories for East Africa
"Afterward"	2004	L’Officiel Italia, September 2018	
"Depth of Blue"	2004	Gargoyle #48, Fall 2004	
"A New Kind of Blue"	2003		Voice of America, 2003
"Fallen Fruit"	2002	Spring/Summer 2002	Voice of America, May 2004

=== Non-fiction ===
- "Scars", Crab Orchard Review, Winter 2002
- "Our Stories Aren’t All Tragedies", The Guardian, 2 August 2005
- "Encounters", The "O" Magazine, South Africa, February 2006
- A monthly column in the magazine African Woman, April 2006 to 2008
- "Lamu Lover", in It's All Love: Black Writers on Soul Mates, Family and Friends, Broadway Books/Doubleday, 2009
- "The Last Word", The African Report, December 2009
- “Hargeisa Snapshots”, African Cities II: Mobilities & Fixtures, 2011
- “Tuk-tuk Trail to Suya and Stars”, AGNI, September 2012
- “Why Write?” START, Journal for East African Arts and Culture, July 2013
- “Betty Oyella Bigombe” in When We Are Bold: Women Who Turn Our Upsidedown World Right, Nobel Women’s Initiative, 2016
- “The Journey: Ebony Ava Harper” in This Bridge Called Woman, H.J. Twongyeirwe & A.T. Lichtenstein, eds., Femrite Publications, 2022.
- “2022 AKO Caine Prize Shortlist Review,” Five Essays, Brittle Paper, July 2022.

== See also ==
- Evangeline Barongo
- Violet Barungi
- Mildred Barya
- Jackee Budesta Batanda
- Angella Emurwon
- Asiimwe Deborah GKashugi
- Jennifer Nansubuga Makumbi
- Irshad Manji
- Rose Mbowa
