= Tropical Fish (disambiguation) =

A tropical fish is a fish found in a tropical environment.

Tropical Fish may also refer to:

- Tropical Fish (film), a 1995 Taiwanese comedy-drama film
- "Tropical Fish", an episode of the television series Teletubbies
- "Tropical Fish" (book)
