= Andrew Kalotay =

Hungarian-American mathematician

Andrew Kalotay (born 1941) is a Hungarian-born finance professor, Wall Street quant and chess master. He is best known as an authority on fixed income valuation and institutional debt management. He is currently the President of Andrew Kalotay Associates, and an adjunct professor at Polytechnic Institute of New York University.

His innovations include the concept of refunding efficiency — a widely used tool for managing callable debt, the ratchet bond — a surrogate for conventional callable bonds, and the volatility reduction measure — for testing hedge effectiveness. Kalotay has also made numerous contributions to the quantitative analysis of option-adjusted spread (OAS), interest rate derivatives, and mortgage-backed securities (MBS); he is an author of the Kalotay–Williams–Fabozzi model. In 1997, he was inducted into the Fixed Income Analysts Society's Hall of Fame.

Kalotay emigrated to Canada following the 1956 Hungarian Revolution. He graduated from Queen's University in Kingston, Ontario, with two degrees in mathematics, earning his bachelor's degree in 1964 and his master's degree in 1966. He moved to the University of Toronto, and completed his doctorate in statistics there in 1968. He then moved to the United States, and has lived there since, to pursue his professional career.

Before founding Andrew Kalotay Associates, he was Director in the Bond Portfolio Analysis Group at Salomon Brothers, and Senior Analyst at Dillon Read. Before coming to Wall Street, he supervised financial planning at AT&T and was involved with operations research and systems engineering at Bell Laboratories. He has been a professor of finance at Fordham University, as well as an adjunct professor at the Wharton School of the University of Pennsylvania and at Columbia University.

His first major Canadian chess event was the 1958 Canadian Open Chess Championship in Winnipeg. He scored 5.5/11 at the Canadian Chess Championship, Brockville, Ontario 1961. Kalotay represented Queen's in interuniversity chess competition, captaining the school's 1963 Canadian championship team. He finished with 8/15 in the Canadian Chess Championship, Winnipeg 1963; the event had Canada's top 16 players. He represented Canada at the 1966 Chess Olympiad in Havana, scoring 4/10 (+2 =4 -4) on the first reserve board.

Kalotay has not played competitive chess since the early 1990s; he has since been active in chess problem composition, where he has also enjoyed success. His daughter is the novelist and short story writer Daphne Kalotay.
