= The Waters (novel) =

2024 novel by Bonnie Jo Campbell

- Author: Bonnie Jo Campbell
- Language: English
- Genre: Family saga
- Publisher: W. W. Norton & Company
- Publication date: January 2024
- Publication place: United States
- Media type: Print (Hardback)
- Pages: 400
- ISBN: 978-0-393-24843-2
- Dewey Decimal: 823

The Waters is a 2024 novel by Michigan author Bonnie Jo Campbell.

== Plot ==
On an island in the middle of a swamp in Michigan, a family has lived for generations. The matriarch, Hermine Zook, is a healer and herbalist who inspires fear and hope in the people of the local town, Whiteheart. Living on the island with her is her granddaughter, Dorothy, who is a budding mathematician and herbalist.

== List of main characters ==
- Hermine "Herself" Zook – Herbalist and eccentric matriarch of the Zook family
- Primrose "Prim" Zook – Herself's daughter, a lawyer (Adopted by Hermine)
- Molly Zook – Herself's daughter, a nurse (Biological daughter of Hermine)
- Rose Thorn Zook - Herself's daughter, beautiful and lazy (Prim daughter)
- Dorothy "Donkey" Zook – Rose Thorn's daughter, a budding mathematician and herbalist
- Titus Clay, Jr. – Rose Thorn's love interest, a farmer

== Reception ==
The novel was chosen as a Read with Jenna January 2024 Book Club pick. Ron Charles of The Washington Post described it as "pure magic". The Los Angeles Times' Jane Smiley described the novel as "earthy" and a "thought-provoking and readable exploration of eccentricity and of all different kinds of love".
