= David Vann (writer) =

American writer (born 1966)

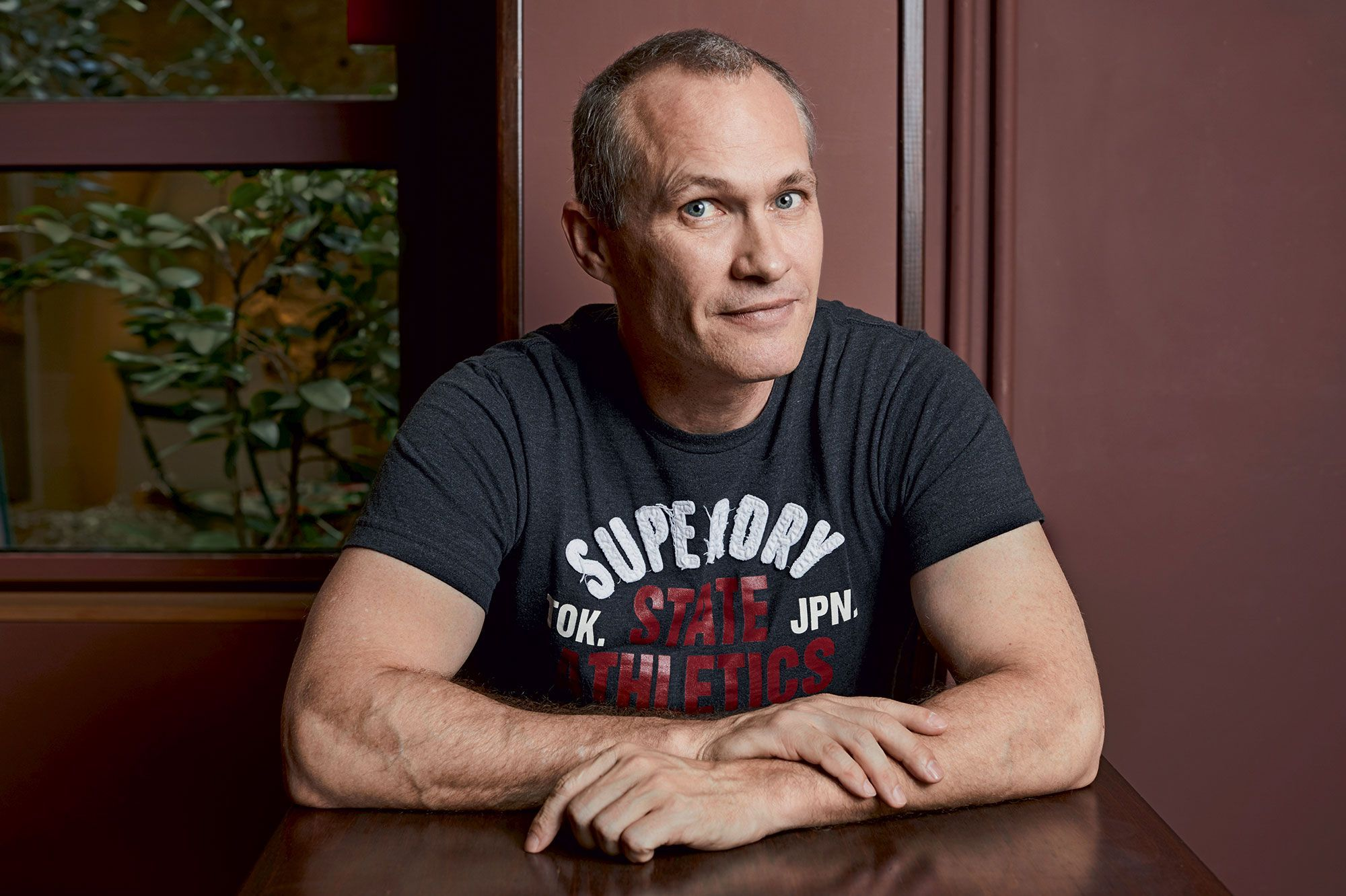
David Vann

David Vann (born October 19, 1966, Adak Island, Alaska) is an American novelist and short story writer, and was formerly a professor of creative writing at the University of Warwick in England. Vann received a Guggenheim Fellowship and has been a National Endowment for the Arts fellow, a Wallace Stegner fellow, and a John L'Heureux fellow. His work has appeared in many magazines and newspapers. His books have been published in 23 languages and have won 14 prizes and been on 83 'best books of the year' lists. They have been selected for The New Yorker Book Club, the Times Book Club, the Samlerens Bogklub in Denmark and have been optioned for film by Inkfactory and Haut et Court. He has appeared in documentaries with the BBC, CNN, PBS, National Geographic, and E!.

== Works ==
- 2005—A Mile Down: The True Story of a Disastrous Career at Sea
- 2008—Legend of a Suicide, stories and a novella
- 2011—Caribou Island
- 2011—Last Day On Earth: A Portrait of the NIU School Shooter
- 2012—Dirt
- 2013—Goat Mountain
- 2014—Crocodile: Memoirs from a Mexican Drug-Running Port, published in Spanish only
- 2015—Aquarium
- 2017—Bright Air Black
- 2019—Halibut on the Moon
- 2020—Le bleu au-delà (The Blue Beyond), published in French only
- 2021—Komodo, published in French only

== Prizes ==
- 2007—Grace Paley Prize for Short Fiction for Legend of a Suicide/Sukkwan Island
- 2008—California Book Award for Legend of a Suicide/Sukkwan Island
- 2009—AWP Nonfiction Award for Last Day on Earth: A Portrait of the NIU School Shooter
- 2010—Prix Médicis Étranger (best foreign novel), France, for Legend of a Suicide/Sukkwan Island
- 2010—Le Prix des Lecteurs de L’Express, France, for Legend of a Suicide/Sukkwan Island
- 2011—Premi Llibreter, Spain, best foreign novel for Legend of a Suicide/Sukkwan Island
- 2013—St. Francis College Literary Prize for Dirt
- Henfield/Transatlantic Review Award for Legend of a Suicide/Sukkwan Island
- 2010—Le Prix des Lecteurs de la Maison du Livre de Rodez for Legend of a Suicide
- 2011—Prix du Marais (regional public library prize in France) for Legend of a Suicide
- 2011—Le Prix de la librairie Nouvelle de Voiron for Caribou Island
- 1st place in Fish Stories Best Fiction Contest for Legend of a Suicide
- 1st prize winner of River City Writing Awards for Legend of a Suicide
- Le Prix de la Médiathèque de Saint-Genis-les-Ollières for Legend of a Suicide

== Prize Lists ==
=== Finalist ===
2nd place Pirate’s Alley Faulkner Society Prize for the novel for Legend of a Suicide

2011—Flaherty-Dunnan First Novel Prize, The Center for Fiction, New York for Caribou Island

2011—Prix du Roman Fnac, France, second place for Caribou Island

2011—Le Prix Lire & Virgin, France, for Caribou Island

2012—PEN CENTER USA Literary Awards finalist in Creative Nonfiction for Last Day On Earth

2012—The Sunday Times Short Story Award shortlist (final 5 out of 1,150), for a short story, “It’s Not Yours”

2013—Prix du Festival Lire en Poche de Gradignan, for Caribou Island

2013—finalist, Grand prix de Littérature policière, France, for Dirt

2013—finalist, California Book Award in Fiction for Goat Mountain

=== Longlisted ===
2008—The Story Prize, for Legend of a Suicide

2013—International IMPAC Dublin Literary Award for Caribou Island

2013—Chautauqua Prize, for Goat Mountain

2014—International IMPAC Dublin Literary Award for Dirt

Two Pushcart Prize nominations for Legend of a Suicide
