= Bonnie Jo Campbell =

American novelist

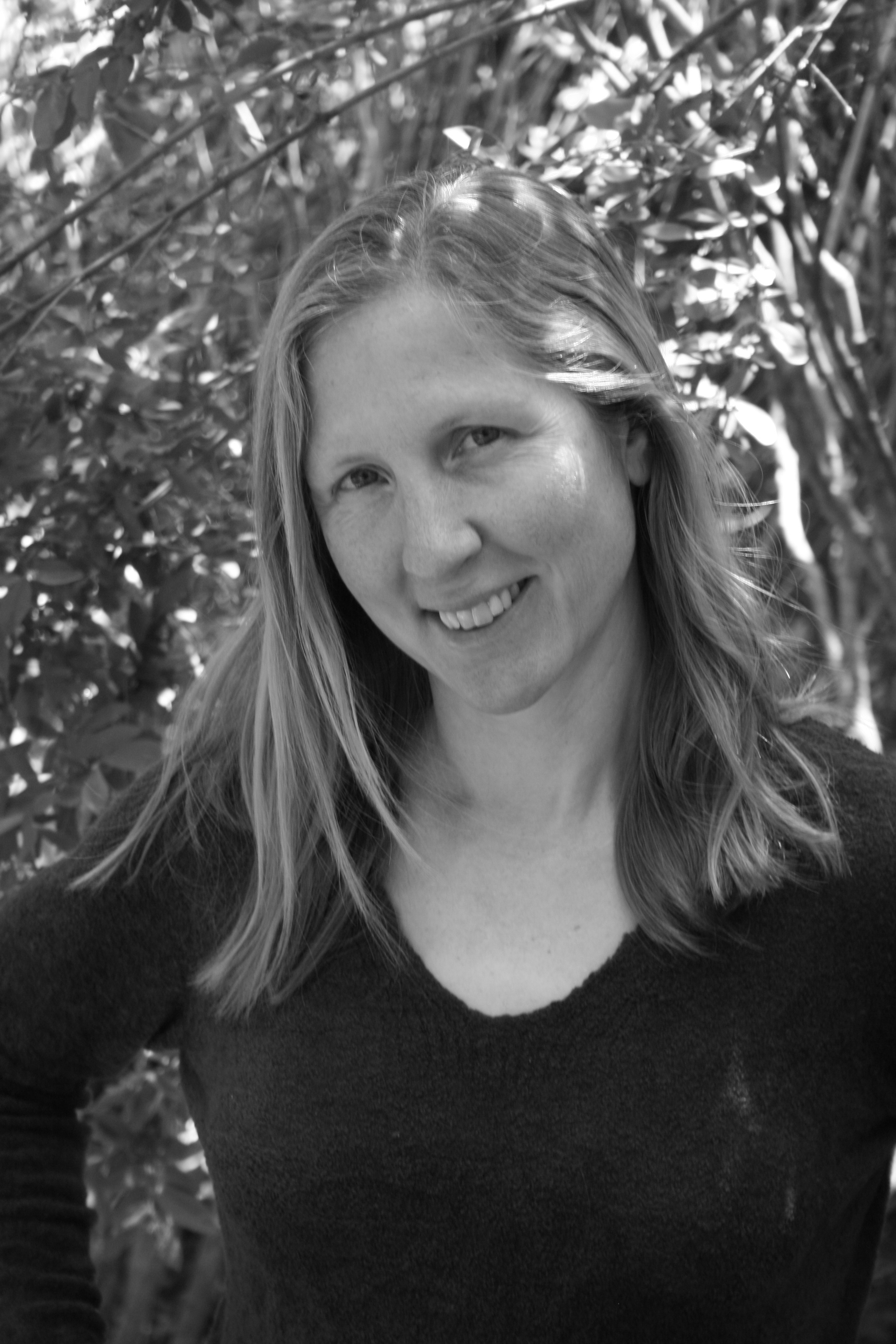
- Campbell in 2009
- Born: September 14, 1962 (age 63) Comstock Township, Michigan, U.S.
- Occupation: Novelist; short story writer
- Education: University of Chicago (BA); Western Michigan University (MA, MFA)
- Spouse: Christopher Magson

Website
- www.bonniejocampbell.com

Bonnie Jo Campbell (born September 14, 1962) is an American novelist and short story writer. Her most recent work is The Waters, published with W. W. Norton and Company.

== Life and work ==
Campbell was born and raised in Comstock Township, Michigan. She graduated from Comstock High School in 1980 and received a BA in philosophy from the University of Chicago in 1984. From Western Michigan University, she received an MA in mathematics in 1995 and an MFA in creative writing in 1998. She has traveled with the Ringling Bros. and Barnum & Bailey Circus, and has organized adventure bicycle tours in Eastern Europe and Russia.

Campbell teaches fiction at Pacific University in Forest Grove, Oregon, in the low-residency MFA program. Campbell lives outside Kalamazoo, Michigan, with her husband, Christopher Magson.

Her stories and essays have appeared in Ontario Review, Story, The Kenyon Review, Witness, The Alaska Quarterly Review, Michigan Quarterly Review, Mid-American Review, and Utne Reader. In 1999, her story "Shifting Gears" was the official story of the Detroit Automobile Dealers' Association Show. Campbell's literary work has been recognized and highlighted at Michigan State University at their Michigan Writers Series.

She was a finalist for the 2009 National Book Award for Fiction for and the National Book Critics Circle Award for Fiction her short story collection American Salvage, which The Kansas City Star named a Top Six Book of 2009. She has won a Pushcart Prize for her story "The Smallest Man in the World", the 1998 Associated Writing Programs Award for short fiction (for Women & Other Animals), and the 2009 Eudora Welty Prize from The Southern Review for "The Inventor, 1972".

In 2009, her manuscript "Love Letters to Sons of Bitches" won the Center for Book Arts' Poetry Chapbook Competition.

The Waters was featured as a "Read With Jenna" selection by Jenna Bush Hager. Campbell also appeared on The Today Show to discuss the book.

The Waters was named to The Washington Post's "50 Notable Works of Fiction from 2024."

== Bibliography ==
=== Short story collections ===
- —— (1999). Women & Other Animals. University of Massachusetts Press. ISBN 9781558492196.
- —— (2009). American Salvage. Wayne State University Press. ISBN 9780814334126.
- —— (2015). Mothers, Tell Your Daughters. W. W. Norton & Company. ISBN 9780393353266.

=== Novels ===
- —— (2003). Q Road. Scribner. ISBN 9780743203661.
- —— (2011). Once Upon a River. W. W. Norton & Company. ISBN 9780393079890.
- —— (2024). The Waters. W. W. Norton & Company. ISBN 9780393248432.

=== Poetry Chapbooks ===
- —— (2009). Love Letters to Sons of Bitches. Center for Book Arts.
