= Q Road =

2002 novel by Bonnie Jo Campbell

- Cover of the 2003 Scribner edition
- Author: Bonnie Jo Campbell
- Language: English
- Genre: Fiction
- Publisher: Scribner
- Publication date: 2002
- Publication place: New York
- Pages: 288
- ISBN: 978-0-7432-0366-1

Q Road is a novel by Bonnie Jo Campbell. Her debut novel, it was published by Scribner in 2002 and received positive reviews.
