= Michelle Richmond =

American novelist

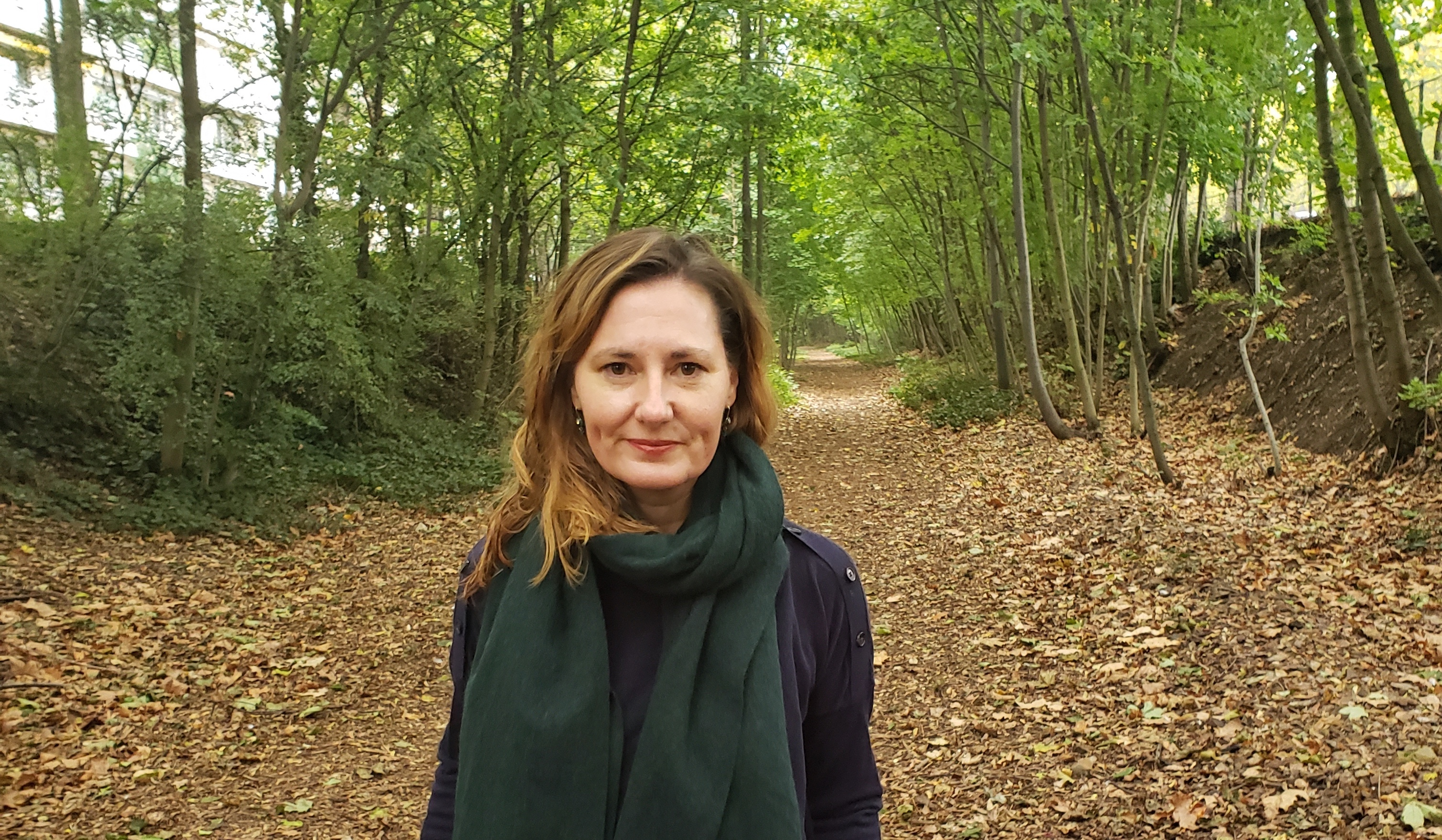
- Education: University of Alabama (BA); University of Miami (MFA)
- Occupations: Novelist; essayist; short story writer
- Writing career
- Notable awards: AWP Award (2000)
- Website: www.michellerichmond.com

Michelle Richmond is an American novelist, essayist, and short story writer. She wrote The Year of Fog, which was a New York Times bestseller, The Marriage Pact, which was a Sunday Times bestseller, and six other books of fiction.

== Biography ==
Richmond grew up in Mobile, Alabama, the second of three sisters. She obtained her BA from the University of Alabama and Master of Fine Arts from the University of Miami, where she was a James Michener Fellow. She has taught at the University of San Francisco, the California College of the Arts, Saint Mary's College of California in Moraga, at Bowling Green State University and Notre Dame de Namur University. She founded Fiction Attic Press and San Francisco Journal of Books and is also a publisher.

== Writing career ==
Richmond's first book, the story collection The Girl in the Fall-Away Dress (2001), was published by the University of Massachusetts Press. Her third book, The Year of Fog (2007), originally called Ocean Beach, was published by Delacorte Press and was a New York Times best seller. Her fourth book, No One You Know (2008), was published by Delacorte Press. Her 2017 novel The Marriage Pact was a selection of the UK's Richard and Judy Book Club and was published in 30 languages Her 2014 story collection Hum received the Catherine Doctorow Innovative Fiction Prize. In 2021, Grove Atlantic published her novel The Wonder Test.

Richmond's book, The Year of Fog, won her acclaim including being selected as one of the best books of 2007 by Library Journal, chosen by Kirkus Reviews as a top pick for Reading Groups, was nominated for the Grand prix des lectrices de Elle award, was listed by the San Francisco Chronicle as a notable book and was a New York Times bestseller and a best selling paperback book for Bantam publishers.

She served on the board of the Authors Guild from 2010 to 2022.

== Awards and recognition ==
Richmond obtained the following awards for her writing:

- 2022 Hall Waters Prize for Excellence in Southern Writing
- 2018 Truman Capote Prize
- 2012 Catherine Doctorow Innovative Fiction Prize for The Hero of Queens Boulevard and Other Stories from FC2.
- 2011 selection of Silicon Valley Reads for The Year of Fog
- Hillsdale Award for Fiction (2009).
- Associated Writing Programs Award for Short Fiction for The Girl in the Fall-Away Dress (2000)
- Mississippi Review Fiction Prize (2006)

== Personal life ==
Richmond resides in Northern California with her husband and son.

== Works ==
- The Girl in the Fall-Away Dress (2001)
- Dream of the Blue Room (2003)
- The Year of Fog (2007)
- No One You Know (2008)
- Hum (2010)
- Golden State (2014)
- The Marriage Pact (2017)
- The Wonder Test (2021)
