= Richard Terrill =

American poet

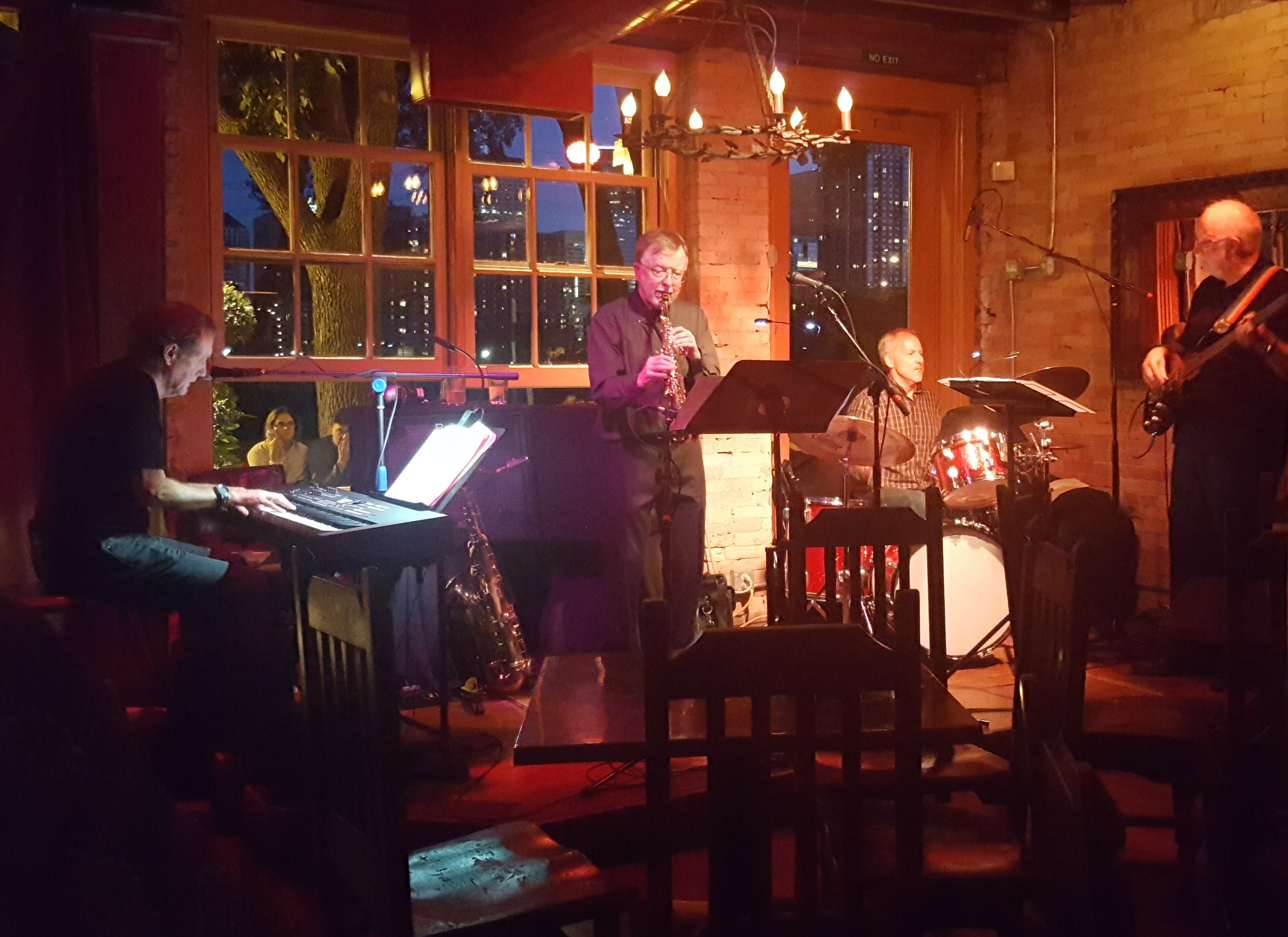
- Richard Terrill (center) playing saxophone with the Larry McDonough Quartet in 2018
- Occupations: writer, musician, professor (retired)
- Writing career
- Notable awards: Minnesota Book Award, Association of Writers & Writing Programs Award

Richard Terrill is an American author and jazz musician who plays with the Larry McDonough Quartet.

== Career ==
Terrill's work as a writer includes three collections of poems: What Falls Away Is Always: Poems and Conversations, Almost Dark and Coming Late to Rachmaninoff, a winner of the Minnesota Book Award. He has also written two nonfiction books: Fakebook: Improvisations on a Journey Back to Jazz and Saturday Night in Baoding: A China Memoir, winner of the Associated Writing Programs Award for nonfiction. Terrill has received fellowships from National Endowment for the Arts, the Wisconsin and Minnesota State Arts Boards, the Jerome Foundation, the MacDowell Colony, and the Bread Loaf Writers’ Conference. He has also worked as a Fulbright professor in China, Korea, and Poland. He formerly taught in the MFA program at Minnesota State University, Mankato as a Distinguished faculty scholar. He retired in 2017.

Terrill is also a jazz saxophonist, and much of his literary work centers on jazz as well. He plays with the Larry McDonough Quartet. Terrill was educated at the University of Wisconsin–Eau Claire where he played with Lyle Mays, a member of the Pat Metheny Group.

== Bibliography ==
=== Poetry ===
- What Falls Away Is Always: Poems and Conversations, Holy Cow! Press, September 2020
- Almost Dark, University of Tampa Press, April 2010
- Coming Late to Rachmaninoff, University of Tampa Press, September 2003

=== Memoir ===
- Fakebook: Improvisations on a Journey Back to Jazz, Limelight Editions, November 2000
- Saturday Night in Baoding: A China Memoir, University of Arkansas Press, February 1990
