= Danielle Cadena Deulen =

American poet, essayist, and academic

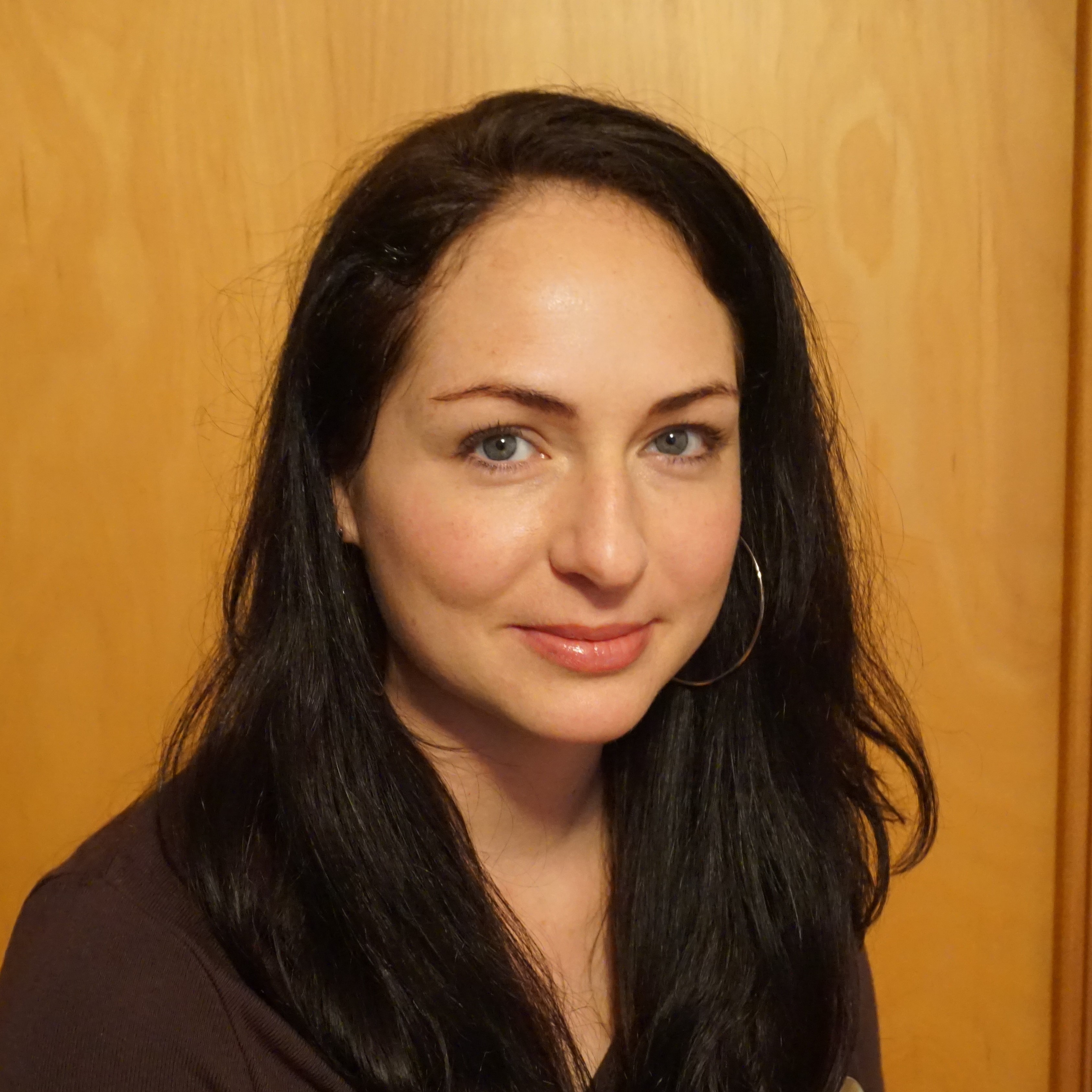
- Born: January 7, 1979 (age 47) Portland, Oregon, US
- Occupation: Poet; essayist; academic

Website
- danielledeulen.net

== Biography ==
Danielle Cadena Deulen was born and raised in Portland, Oregon to Daniel Deulen and Cecilia Cadena. Much of her early life is explored in her personal essay collection, The Riots.

== Selected works ==
Deulen's first collection of poems, Lovely Asunder (U. of Arkansas Press, 2011), won the 2010 Miller Williams Arkansas Poetry Prize of the University of Arkansas Press, which subsequently published the book, and the 2012 Utah Book Award.

The Riots (U. of Georgia Press, 2011) is a book of essays which won the 2010 the AWP Prize in Creative Nonfiction. It also won the Great Lakes Colleges Association New Writers Award for Creative Nonfiction.

Her 2023 collection Desire Museum won the 2024 Lambda Literary Award for Bisexual Poetry.

== Honors and awards ==
- 2024 Lambda Literary Award for Bisexual Poetry
- 2018 Oregon Literary Fellowship, Oregon Literary Arts
