= Sarah Einstein =

American writer

- Born: November 30, 1965 (age 60); Huntington, West Virginia, United States
- Occupations: Non-fiction writer; essayist; memoirist
- Writing career
- Genre: literary nonfiction

Sarah Einstein (born 30 November 1965) is an American essayist and writer of memoir and literary nonfiction. She is a recipient of the Association of Writers & Writing Programs Award for Creative Nonfiction, and the Pushcart Prize.

== Early life ==
Sarah Einstein was born in Huntington, West Virginia in 1965. She started writing in her twenties, after attending a writing workshop with Kevin Oderman.

== Education ==
Einstein earned a Master of Fine Arts in creative writing at West Virginia University in 2011. Einstein earned her PhD in Creative Nonfiction in 2014 from Ohio University. She studied under Dinty W. Moore.

== Career ==
Einstein is currently an associate professor of Creative Writing at the University of Tennessee at Chattanooga.

Einstein's essays have appeared in The Sun, Ninth Letter, Pank Magazine, Fringe, Quiddy, and Hawai’i Pacific Review, among other literary journals. She is the fiction editor at Stirring: A Literary Collective and co-author, with Dominik Henrici, of Writers for Dinner.

== Awards ==
In 2011, she received a Best of the Net Award. That same year, she also received a Pushcart Prize. In 2014, Einstein received the Association of Writers & Writing Programs Award for Creative Nonfiction.

== Works ==
=== Non-fiction books ===
- Mot: A Memoir. Athens, Georgia: University of Georgia Press. 2015.
- Remnants of Passion. Shebooks. 2014.

=== Essays ===
- Mountain Jews. Athens, Ohio: Ohio University Press. 2014.
- "How to Die Alone". Quiddity. 2014.
- "How to Die Alone". Quiddity. 2014.
- "Shelter". The Sun. 2014.
- "This is the Problem with all that New Age Bullshit about Thinking Positive and Not Letting the Disease Win". Gargoyle. 2014.<
- "What Therefore Dinty Has Joined Together". Bending Genre. 2014.
- "When I Lived in Manhattan". Fringe Magazine. 2013.
- "For Taube, Many Decades Later, on Why I Gave Her Baby Pink Nail Polish on Her Thirteenth Birthday when She had Asked for Cherry Red". Hawai'i Pacific Review. 2013.
- "A Meditation on Love". The Fiddleback. 2011.
- "Dick Move". Fringe Magazine. 2011.
- "Fat". PANK Magazine. 2010.
- "Self Portrait in Apologies". Fringe Magazine. 2010.
- "The Future Imperfect". Redstone Science Fiction. 2010.
- "How to Die Alone". Quiddity. 2014.
- "Mot". Ninth Letter. 2009.
- "The Way Things Go". Whitefish Review. 2008.
- "Fearsome Beauty". Fringe Magazine. 2007.

=== Short stories ===
- "Walking and Falling". Sixfold. 2013.
- "Christmas in the Mountains". Bartleby Snopes. 2010.
- "Little Deaths". Conte. 2007.
