= Evangeline Barongo =

Ugandan author of children's literature

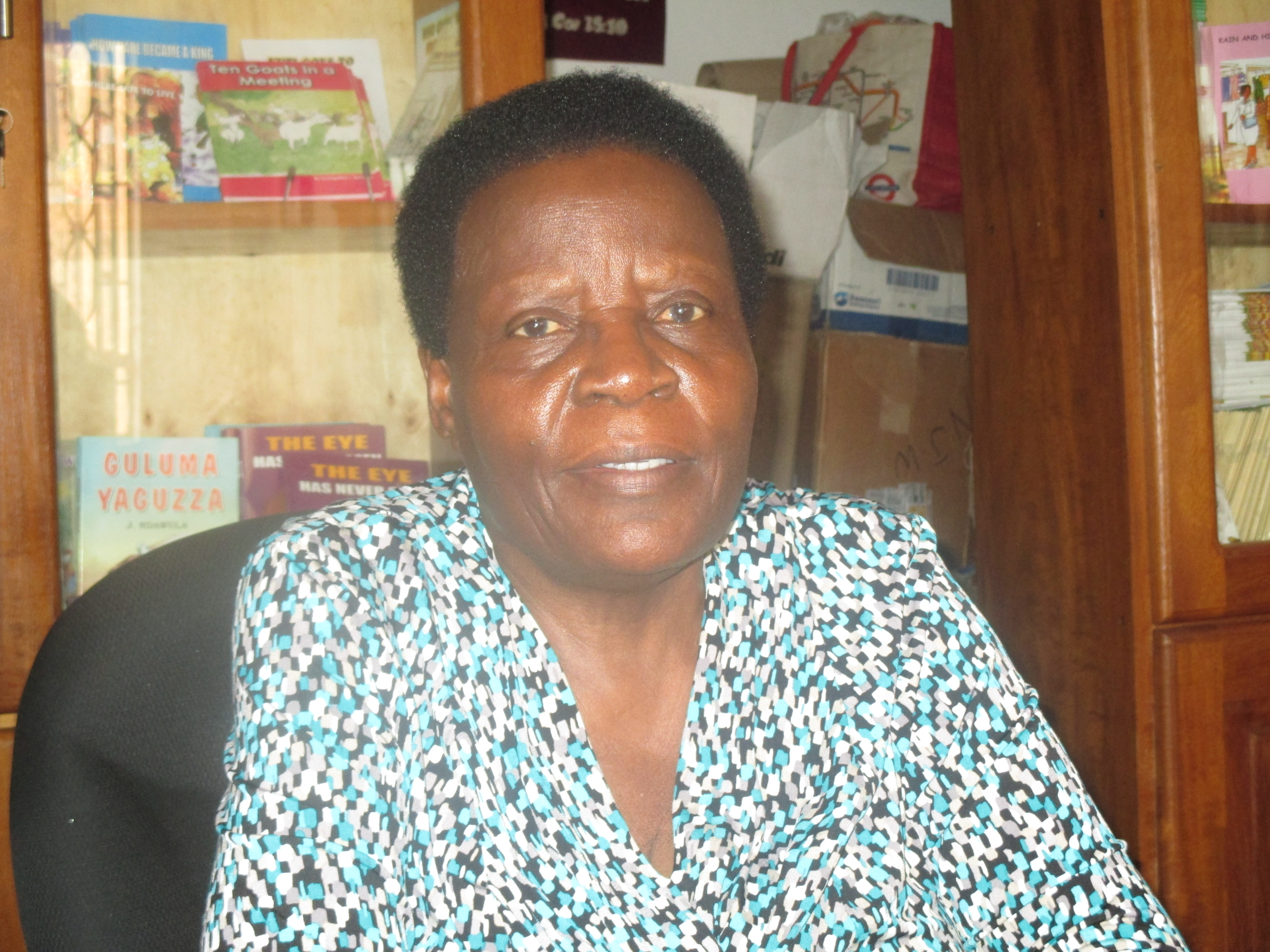
- Evangeline Barongo
- Born: Evangeline Barongo; Uganda
- Occupation: writer
- Writing career
- Genre: Fiction

Evangeline Barongo is a Ugandan author of children's literature. Barongo is a founding member of the Uganda Children’s Writers and Illustrators Association (UCWIA), a platform that brings together writers and illustrators of children’s books, librarians, teachers, publishers, and booksellers. She is also a member of the Reading Association of Uganda (RAU), Uganda Library and Information Association and the International Board on Books for Young People (IBBY) Uganda chapter established in 2004. She has served on the board of the National Book Trust of Uganda since its inception in 1997.

== Early life and education ==
She trained as a nursery nurse and worked for a year in England after studying a course in children's psychology. She later earned a diploma in Library Science from Bayero University Kano in Nigeria before working as a librarian at the university. She returned to Uganda in 1986 to work with the Uganda Public Libraries Board while running a children's library service in Kampala. In 1991, Barongo won a two-month scholarship at the International Youth Library in Munich.

== Writing ==
Barongo has undertaken children’s projects in Sweden, South Africa, and the United States. She writes in both English and Runyoro, her mother tongue. Her books are marketed in Europe and have won her several awards, among which is the NABOTU author of the year in 2008. Barongo is now retired from active civil service but owns a bookshop in Hoima and continues to write for children and stay involved in children’s reading promotion activities.

== Published works ==
=== Books ===
- Courageous weaver bird. Uganda Children's writers and illustrators association. 2015.
- Ten goats in a meeting. Uganda Children's writers and illustrators association. 2014.
- My Precious Name. Teach Twice. 2012.
- ABCD ... Guess who?. Uganda Children's writers and illustrators association. 2009.
- Greedy Monkey Looses a Best Friend. Uganda Children's writers and illustrators association. 2008.
- My Name is Street Child, Begger Rose: Gr 4 & 5 (Stars of Africa). Maskew Miller Longman Pty. Ltd, South Africa. 2002. ISBN 978-0636049635. with H. Hoveka
- The African Children's Stories. Lake Publishers & Enterprises. 1994. ISBN 9789966847690. with Ruth M. Mwayi
- The ten foolish goats
- Our escape from school discovered
- We Are All Animals
- Pilo and Joba
- Who Owns The Fruit Tree
- Kaheru the Orphan
- How hare became a king
- Ngonzaki and her decorated letters
- Lazy crocodile and wise monkey
- East Africa: Silent Partners
- O meu nome é Criança da Rua, Pedinte ... Rosa

=== Papers ===
- "Silent Partners". UNESCO Courier. July–August 1997. Archived from the original on 4 March 2016 – via Questia.
