= Iliana Rocha =

American poet and writer from Texas

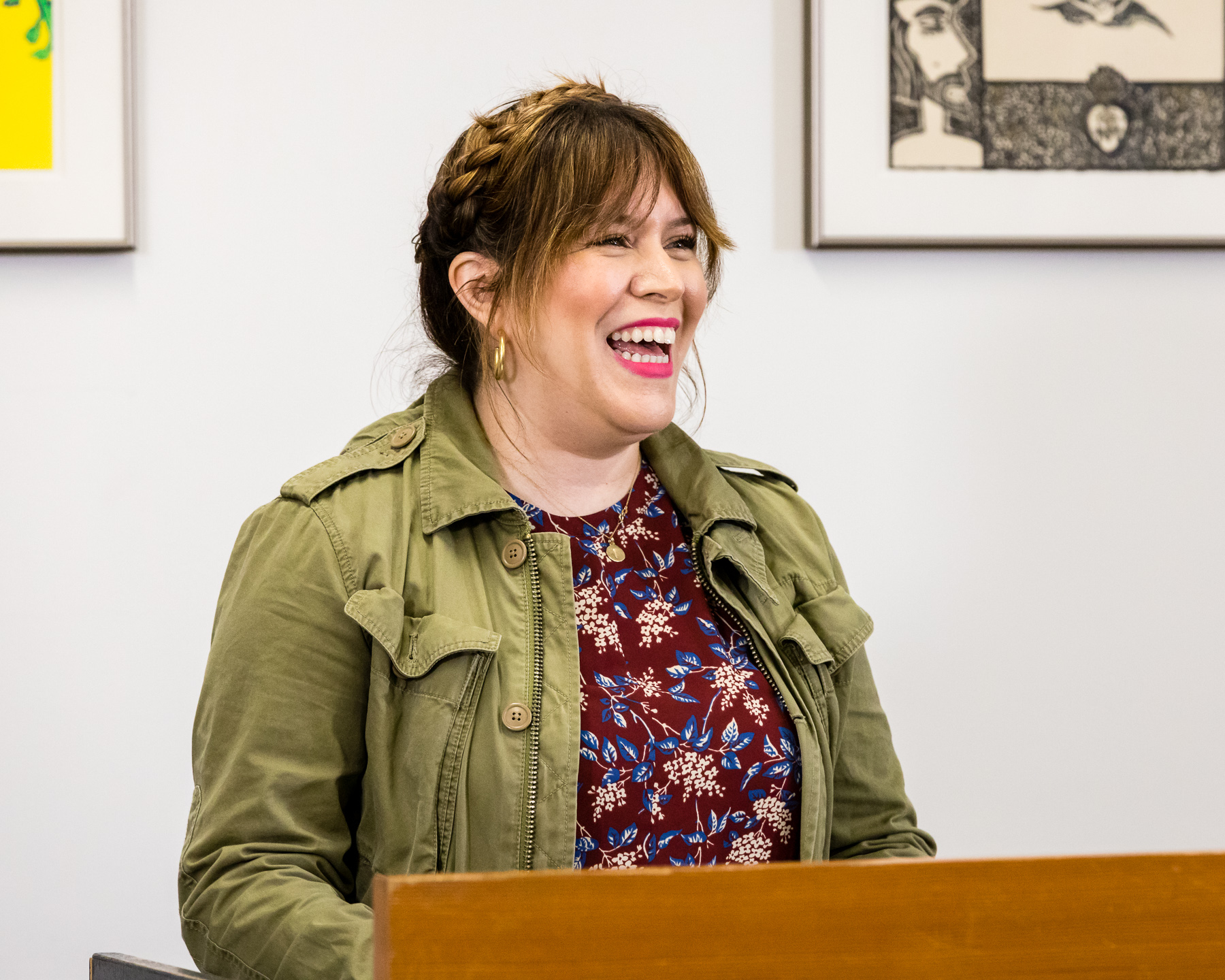
Rocha speaking at the 2019 Creative Writing Program at Arizona State University

Iliana Rocha is an American poet and writer from Texas. Her debut collection, Karankawa (2015), won an AWP Donald Hall Prize for Poetry and a Society of Midland Authors Award.

Iliana Rocha's work has been featured in Best American Poetry online, as well as the Nation, VQR, Blackbird, and Waxwing.

== Career ==
Rocha earned her MFA in poetry from Arizona State University, where she was poetry editor for Hayden’s Ferry Review. She taught composition and rhetoric at Arizona State and developmental writing at South Mountain Community College. Rocha earned a PhD in English and creative writing at Western Michigan University.

Rocha is currently assistant professor of creative writing at the University of Central Oklahoma.

== Publications ==
Karankawa, University of Pittsburgh Press, 2015.
