= Daphne Kalotay =

American novelist

- Citizenship: United States and Canada
- Education: Vassar College, Boston University
- Relatives: Andrew Kalotay (father)
- Writing career
- Notable works: Calamity and Other Stories, Russian Winter, Sight Reading
- Notable awards: Florence Engel Randall Fiction Prize, Transatlantic Review Award from The Henfield Foundation, 2011 Writers' League of Texas Fiction Prize

Daphne Kalotay is a novelist and short story writer who lives in Somerville, Massachusetts. She is known for her novels, Russian Winter (Harper, 2010), Sight Reading (Harper, 2013), and Blue Hours (TriQuarterly, 2019) and her two collections of short stories, Calamity and Other Stories (Doubleday, 2005) and The Archivists (TriQuarterly, 2023). She is a graduate of Vassar College and holds an MA in creative writing and a PhD in literature from Boston University, where she has also taught. In addition, she has taught at Middlebury College and been a writer-in-residence at Skidmore College and Lynchburg College. From 2014 to 2016 she was the Visiting Writer in English at the University of Massachusetts Boston. From 2017 to 2023 she was a lecturer at Princeton University. She currently teaches at Harvard Extension School. She is a citizen of both the United States and Canada.

== Biography ==
Kalotay was raised in Madison, New Jersey, and attended Vassar College. In 1993, she moved to Brookline, Massachusetts, to attend Boston University's Masters Program in Creative Writing and remained at Boston University to complete a PhD in Modern and Contemporary Literature at the now-defunct University Professors Program. Studying under her advisor Saul Bellow, she wrote a dissertation on the Canadian writer Mavis Gallant and graduated in 1998.

In 1999, she moved to Vermont for a term position at Middlebury College, where she taught for the English department. She returned to Massachusetts in 2002 and since then has lived in the Boston area. From 2012 to 2014, she served as co-president of the Women's National Book Association's Boston chapter. In 2017, her short story "Relativity" was the One City/One Story Boston selection. The Archivists was longlisted for the Joyce Carol Oates Prize and the 2024 Massachusetts Book Awards. It was a Boston Author's Club "Notable Book."

== Critical acclaim ==
Kalotay has received numerous awards for her fiction, including the 2011 Writers' League of Texas Fiction Prize for her novel Russian Winter and the Florence Engel Randall Fiction Prize and a Transatlantic Review Award from The Henfield Foundation.

Her novel Sight Reading won the 2014 New England Society Book Award and was a finalist for the 2014 Paterson Fiction Prize. Calamity and Other Stories made the short list for the 2005 Story Prize. Blue Hours was a Massachusetts Book Awards "Must Read" The Archivists won the Grace Paley Prize for Short Fiction and was longlisted for the Joyce Carol Oates Prize. It was a Boston Author's Club "Notable Book."

She has been awarded fellowships from the Christopher Isherwood Foundation, MacDowell, the Bogliasco Foundation, and Yaddo. Her short fiction collection, Calamity and Other Stories, was shortlisted for the 2005 Story Prize. Her work has been reviewed in the New York Times, the New Yorker, Washington Post, The Guardian, The Rumpus, the Boston Globe, the Philadelphia Inquirer, O Magazine, The Oregonian, Good Housekeeping, USA Today and dozens of other publications.

== Bibliography ==
=== Books ===
- Sight Reading: A Novel (Harper, 2013) ISBN 978-0-062-24693-6
- Russian Winter: A Novel (Harper, 2010) ISBN 978-0-061-96217-2
- Calamity and Other Stories (Doubleday, 2005) ISBN 978-1-400-07848-6
- Blue Hours (Northwestern University Press, 2019) ISBN 978-0-8101-4056-1
- The Archivists (TriQuarterly, 2023) ISBN 978-0810146082

=== Short fiction ===
- "Awake" in Memorious 26, June 2016
- "Russian Winter: A Story" in Fusion: A Global Forum, Volume 3, Issue #1, 2012
- "What Madame Lipsky Wanted" in Good Housekeeping, January 2005
- "All Life's Grandeur" in Prairie Schooner, Summer 2004
- "Calamity" in AGNI online, July 2003
- "The Man from Allston Electric" in AGNI no. 55, 2002
- "Seeing" in Missouri Review, vol. xxiv, no.2, 2001
- "Serenade" in Missouri Review, vol. xxiii, 2000
- "Sunshine Cleaners" in Michigan Quarterly Review, vol. xxxix, no. 1, Winter 2000
- "Snapshots" in The Literary Review, vol. 42, no. 4, Summer 1999
- "The Business of Love". Virginia Quarterly Review. 75 (2). Spring 1999 – via Questia.
- "Alabaster Doesn't Count" in Bellowing Ark, September/October 1996

=== Essays ===
- "The Calm Before the Calm: Silence and the Creative Writer," Poets & Writers, May/June 2013, p. 37-39.
- "The Art of Reading Gina Berriault," Poets & Writers, Sept/Oct 2012, p. 33-39.
- "Biography of a Novel," Fusion: A Global Forum, Volume 3, Issue # 1, 2012, p. 186-88.
- "The Other Daphne: Du Maurier's Short Stories," Memorious.org, Sept. 7, 2010
- "Narration and 'Psychic Distance'" in Now Write! (Penguin 2006) pp. 78–81, S. Ellis, ed.
- "Recommendation: the Stories of Gina Berriault," Post Road 11, Fall 2005, pp. 31–32.
- Mavis Gallant interview, The Art of Fiction no. 160, Paris Review #153, Winter 1999

=== Book reviews ===
- "Essays" New York Times Sunday Book Review 2016
- "Was It Any Use? Donal Ryan's 'Spinning Heart'" New York Times Sunday Book Review 2014
- "The Kids Are Alright" on a novel by Sarah Braunstein, Tottenville Review #4, 2011
- "Journey to the Center of a Character" on a novella by Tony Tulathimutte, Tottenville Review #3, 2011
- "All That Work and Still No Boys" on a story collection by Kathryn Ma, Tottenville Review #2, 2010
- "The Delighted States" on a nonfiction book by Adam Thirlwell, Tottenville Review #1, 2010
- "The Poetry of a Translation" review of poetry by Marcello Fabbri, Vassar Quarterly Summer, 1996
- "Exploring the Bear Essentials in Oregon" review of The Bear Essential, Vassar Quarterly, Winter 1995

=== Poetry Translation ===
- Partisan Review: translations from the Hungarian of poems by Attila Jozsef (vol. lxiii, no. 3, Summer 1996)

=== Interviews ===
- An interview with Daphne Kalotay, 2020
- Daphne Kalotay on Female Friendships in Literature and Life, 2020
- Daphne Kalotay on American Intervention in Afghanistan and Civilian Responsibility, 2019
- In Life And Work, War Is Personal For Author Daphne Kalotay, 2019
- Daphne Kalotay Blue Hours, 2019
- The Significance of Ordinary Lives: An Interview with Daphne Kalotay, 2019
- 'Blue Hours' by Daphne Kalotay, 2019
- Daphne Kalotay with Caroline Leavitt, 2019
- Two coming-of-age stories in one, 2019
- Fiction Spotlight: Daphne Kalotay, 2019
