= George Michael Cuomo =

American novelist (1929–2015)

- Born: October 10, 1929; New York City, New York
- Died: October 26, 2015 (aged 86)
- Education: Tufts University; Indiana University Bloomington
- Occupation: Novelist
- Writing career
- Genre: Poetry

George Michael Cuomo (October 10, 1929 in New York City – October 26, 2015) was an American author of eight novels, as well as short stories, poetry, and a nonfiction book.

== Life ==
He attended Stuyvesant High School and earned a B.A from Tufts University in 1952 and an M.A. from Indiana University in 1955. Cuomo taught at the University of Arizona, the University of California, the University of Victoria in British Columbia, and the University of Massachusetts Amherst.

His work appeared in Antioch Review, Minnesota Review, The Nation, Saturday Review, Tamarack Review.

Cuomo's first novel, Jack be Nimble, was published in 1963. The novel's eponymous narrator evokes (no doubt intentionally) the anti-hero of All the King's Men, transplanted to the topsy-turvy world of collegiate football. His subsequent novels, which include Among Thieves, Family Honor, and Trial By Water, engage troubling issues of race, class, and social justice. Cuomo's deeply fallible heroes tend to be people that genteel society would prefer to forget: a small-time criminal caught up in a brutal prison riot, a racial minority ensnared in a domestic terrorist plot.

His name has been mentioned more than once in lists of unfairly neglected authors, for example by Richard Yates in Ploughshares. His papers are held at University of Victoria.

== Awards ==
- 1983 Guggenheim Fellowship

== Works ==
- Trial By Water, Alfred A. Knopf Incorporated, ISBN 978-0-679-42240-2
- Jack be nimble: a novel, Doubleday, 1963
- Bright day, dark runner: a novel, Doubleday, 1964
- Among Thieves, Doubleday, 1968 ISBN 978-0-340-10910-6
- Sing, choirs of angels, Doubleday, 1969
- The hero's great great great great great grandson: a novel, Atheneum, 1971
- Geronimo and the Girl Next Door, BkMk Press, 1973, ISBN 978-0-933532-16-8
- Family honor: an American life, Doubleday, 1983, ISBN 978-0-385-11077-8

=== Anthologies ===
- Regina Barreca, ed. (2002). Don't tell mama!: the Penguin book of Italian American writing. Penguin Books. ISBN 978-0-14-200247-6.
