= Lia Purpura =

American poet, writer and educator (born 1964)

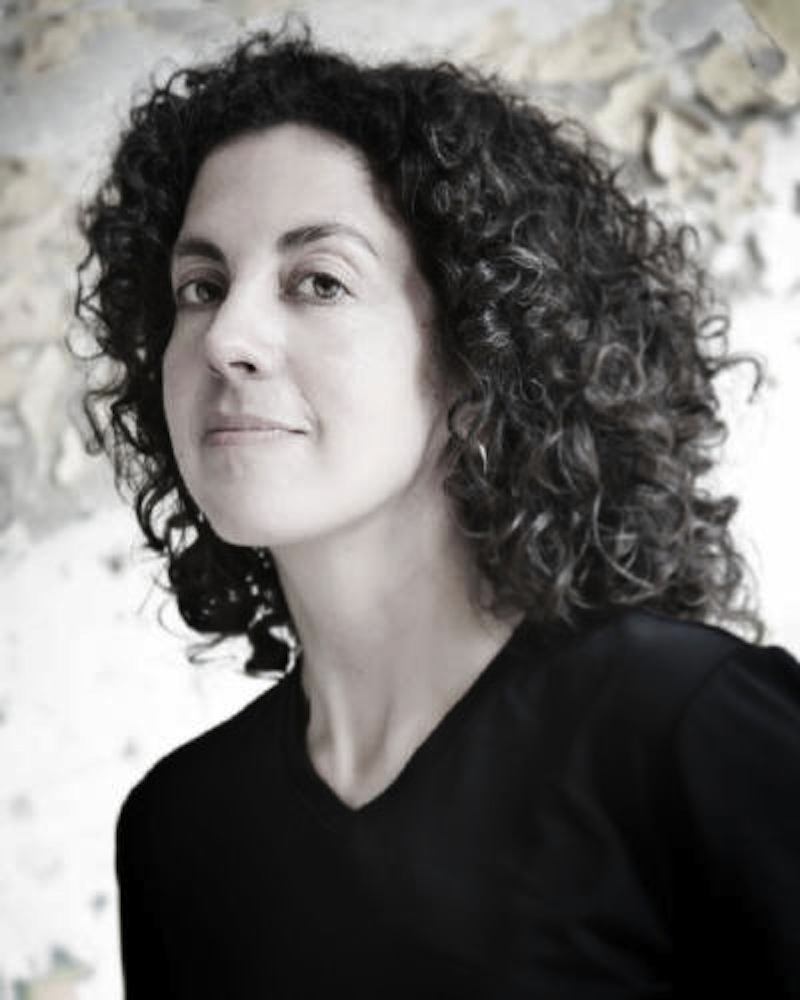
- Born: February 22, 1964 (age 62); Mineola, New York
- Education: Oberlin College; Iowa Writers' Workshop
- Writing career
- Genres: Poetry; Essays

Lia Purpura (born February 22, 1964) is an American poet and essayist. She is the author of four collections of poems (The Brighter the Veil, Stone Sky Lifting, King Baby, It Shouldn’t Have Been Beautiful), four collections of essays (Increase, On Looking, Rough Likeness, All the Fierce Tethers), and one collection of translations (Poems of Grzegorz Musial: Berliner Tagebuch and Taste of Ash). Her awards include fellowships from the Guggenheim Foundation, The NEA, The Fulbright Foundation, and others. On Looking was a Finalist for the National Book Critics Circle Award. Her poems and essays appear in: Agni, The New Yorker, Poetry, Orion, The Paris Review, The New Republic, The Georgia Review. Emergence, and elsewhere.

== Early life and education ==
Lia Purpura grew up on Long Island, NY and received a BA from Oberlin College and an MFA, (as a Teaching-Writing Fellow) from the Iowa Writers’ Workshop.

== Career ==
Lia Purpura served as Writer in Residence at the University of Maryland, Baltimore County and Loyola University, Maryland, and taught at the low-residency MFA program The Rainier Writing Workshop. She had also taught at The Breadloaf Writers’ Conference, The Bennington Writing Program, The University of Iowa’s Nonfiction MFA program, The Minnesota Northwoods Conference, and served as Visting Writer at the Eastman School of Music, The Chautauqua Institution, and elsewhere.

== Awards ==
Lia Purpura was a finalist for the National Book Critics Circle Award (for On Looking) and was awarded fellowships from the Guggenheim Foundation, the National Endowment for the Arts, a Fulbright Fellowship (translation, Warsaw Poland), Maryland State Arts Council Awards, and multiple fellowship residencies at The MacDowell Colony, as well as residencies at the Millay Colony, Blue Mountain Center, and Virginia Center for the Creative Arts.

Other awards include:

- All the Fierce Tethers (Sarabande Books 2019): Independent Publishers Book Award (Gold); Nautilus Book Award in Lyric Prose (Gold)
- King Baby (poems, Alice James Books, 2008) won the Beatrice Hawley Award and was a finalist for the Foreword Magazine Book of the Year Award and the Maine Literary Award.
- On Looking (essays, Sarabande Books, 2006) was a finalist for the National Book Critics Circle Award and the winner of the Towson University Prize in Literature.
- Increase (essays, University of Georgia Press, 2000) won the Associated Writing Programs Award in Creative Nonfiction.
- Stone Sky Lifting (poems, Ohio State University Press, 2000) won the OSU Press/The Journal Award.
- The Brighter the Veil (poems, Orchises Press, 1996) won the Towson University Prize in Literature.

== Discography ==
=== Collaborations ===
- The Poulenc Trio: Creation, featuring Lia Purpura, poet, (Delos/Naxos, 2016)

== Bibliography ==
=== Essays ===
- All the Fierce Tethers: Essays. Sarabande Books. 2019. ISBN 978-1-946448-30-9.
- Rough Likeness: Essays. Sarabande Books. 2011. ISBN 978-1-936747-34-4.
- On Looking: Essays. Sarabande Books, Incorporated. 2006. ISBN 978-1-936747-21-4.
- Increase. University of Georgia Press. 2000. ISBN 978-0-8203-2232-2.

=== Poetry ===
==== Collections ====
- Gather (Poems) Alice James Books, 2028
- It Shouldn't Have Been Beautiful (Poems) Penguin Press, 2015, ISBN 978-0-14-312690-4
- King Baby (Poems) Alice James Books, 2008, ISBN 9781882295685
- Stone Sky Lifting (Poems) Ohio State University Press, 2000, ISBN 9780814250655
- The Brighter the Veil (Poems) Orchises Press, 1996, ISBN 9780914061564

==== Translations ====
- Grzegorz Musiał (1998). Poems of Grzegorz Musial: Berliner Tagebuch and Taste of Ash. Fairleigh Dickinson Univ Press. pp. 4–. ISBN 978-0-8386-3783-8. (Translation)

Artist’s Book, Letterpress, Artwork

- Threadings. Artist’s Portfolio and Journal, and Essays (Agni, #102)
- First Adventures in Beauty (SeeDouble Press)
- Scream, or, Neverminding (Literary House Press, Washington College, MD)

==== List of poems ====
Title	Year	First published	Reprinted/collected
Prayer	2012	Purpura, Lia (November 19, 2012). "Prayer". The New Yorker.	
Beginning	2013	Purpura, Lia (April 29, 2013). "Beginning". The New Yorker. Vol. 89, no. 11. p. 60.	

== Podcasts and Interviews ==
- Contemplify: Tending to the Spiritual Interior of Language
- The Slowdown (introduced by Tracy K. Smith)
- The New Yorker Podcasts: Lia Purpura Reads Carl Phillips and her own work
- Poetry Society of America
- Essay Daily

== Sources ==
- Alice James Books > Author Page > Lia Purpura
