= François Camoin =

French and American writer (1939–2019)

- Born: François André Camoin; June 20, 1939; Nice, France
- Died: March 19, 2019 (aged 79); Salt Lake City, Utah, U.S.
- Children: 4

Academic background
- Education: University of Arizona (BA, MA); University of Massachusetts Amherst (PhD)

Academic work
- Discipline: Creative writing
- Sub-discipline: Poetry
- Institutions: Slippery Rock State College; Denison University; University of Utah

François André Camoin (June 20, 1939 – March 18, 2019), was a French and American academic and short story writer.

== Early life and education ==
Born in Nice, France, Camoin moved to the Brookline, Massachusetts, in 1951. He earned Bachelor of Arts and Master of Arts degrees from the University of Arizona and a PhD from the University of Massachusetts Amherst in 1967.

== Career ==
Camoin began his career as a professor at Slippery Rock State College and Denison University. He taught at the University of Utah from 1978 until 2011, when he retired due to illness. His students included authors Chuck Rosenthal and Rob Roberge. His work was featured in Mid-American Review, The Missouri Review, the Nimrod International Journal of Prose and Poetry, and Quarterly West.

== Personal life ==
Camoin lived in Salt Lake City with his wife. They had four children–three sons and one daughter.

== Awards ==
- 1985 Flannery O'Connor Award for Short Fiction
- 1995 Salt Lake City Mayor's Artist Award
- 2004 Utah Humanities Council Grant

== Works ==
- April, May, and So On. What Books Press. 2009. ISBN 978-0-9823542-4-7.
- Like Love But Not Exactly. University of Missouri Press. 1992. ISBN 978-0-8262-0845-3.
- Deadly Virtues. Arrowood Books. 1988. ISBN 978-0-934847-06-3.
- Why Men Are Afraid of Women. University of Georgia Press. January 1985. ISBN 978-0-8203-0722-0.
- Why Men Are Afraid of Women (Flannery O'Connor Award For Short Fiction). University of Georgia Press. March 2013. ISBN 978-0820344621. (Reprint)
- The End of the World Is Los Angeles. University of Missouri Press. April 1982. ISBN 978-0-8262-0365-6.
- Benbow and Paradise. Dutton. 1975. ISBN 978-0-525-06315-5.
- The Revenge Convention in Webster, Middleton and Tourneur. Institut für Englische Sprache und Literatur, Universität Salzburg. 1972.

=== Anthologies ===
- Janice Eidus; John Kastan, eds. (1998). It's only rock and roll: an anthology of rock and roll short stories. David R. Godine Publisher. ISBN 978-1-56792-089-5.
- Charles East, ed. (1993). "Peacock Blue". The Flannery O'Connor Award: Selected Stories. University of Georgia Press. p. 40. ISBN 978-0-8203-1524-9.
