= Asiimwe Deborah GKashugi =

Ugandan playwright

- Born: Deborah Asiimwe
- Education: Kashwa Primary School; Bweranyangi Girls School; Makerere University; California Institute of the Arts
- Occupations: writer, performer, and producer
- Writing career
- Genre: plays
- Notable work: Will Smith Look Alike
- Notable awards: Winner of the 2010 BBC African Performance Play Writing Competition

Asiimwe Deborah GKashugi is a Ugandan playwright, performer, and producer, currently working as Specialist for Sundance Institute East Africa and a mentor with the Hamburg, Germany-based Do School, Her recent plays include Forgotten World, Cooking Oil, Appointment with gOD and Un-entitled, which have all been received either as productions or stage readings in the United States of America and East Africa. Her play Will Smith Look Alike won the 2010 BBC African Performance Play Writing Competition. She is a 2006 recipient of a scholarship of merit in Writing for Performance from California Institute of the Arts, where she graduated with a Master in Fine Arts (MFA) degree in 2009, and of the 2010 Theatre Communications Group's New Generation Future Leaders grant to work with the Sundance Institute Theatre Program.

== Early life and education ==
Deborah went to Kashwa Primary School, in present-day Kiruhura District. She attended Bweranyangi Girls School for her secondary education, before joining Makerere University, where she did a diploma in Music, Dance and Drama. She returned to Makerere University and received a Bachelor of Arts in Drama (Honors), 2003–2006. She got a scholarship and did a Master of Fine Arts (MFA) degree in Writing for Performance at California Institute of the Arts.

== Writing ==
Deborah's interest in storytelling and performance started in her childhood. She was raised in an oral literature and storytelling culture, with her parents reciting Ebyevugo poetry to her poetry as she was growing up. The majority of her work explores socio-political issues that affect developing countries. She writes for stage, sometimes for radio and for screen. Her work has been performed in Nairobi, Kenya, Kisumu, Kenya, and Kigali, Rwanda. In 2010, she was a recipient of the Theatre Communications Group's New Generation Future Leaders grant to work with the Sundance Institute Theatre Program. In the same year, Will Smith Look Alike, a radio play by Deborah Asiimwe, was the overall winner of the BBC playwriting competition. She received a co-operation fellowship of JES (Junges Ensemble Stuttgart) and Akademie Schloss Solitude for 2015. She has participated in many artists' gatherings and conferences, including the annual Arts in the One World Conference (CalArts, Valencia, California), a project of The More Life: Cultural Studies and Genocide Initiative, a collaboration between CalArts and the Interdisciplinary Genocide Study Center in Kigali, Rwanda; the Women Playwrights International (WPI) in the Philippines (2003); and is the 2003 Sundance Theatre Lab international observer, and others.

== Bibliography ==
- Forgotten World
- Cooking Oil
- Appointment with gOD
- Un-entitled
- Lagoma is Searching
- You are that Man
- My Secret

== Awards and recognition ==
- Winner of the 2010 BBC African Performance Play Writing Competition for her play Will Smith Look Alike.
- Recipient of the 2006 scholarship of merit in Writing for Performance from California Institute of the Arts
- Recipient of the 2010 Theatre Communications Group's New Generation Future Leaders grant to work with the Sundance Institute Theatre Program
