= Rebecca Kavaler =

Rebecca Kavaler (July 26, 1920 – April 14, 2008), short story writer and novelist, was born in the U.S. state of Georgia. She resided in New York City for more than two decades. During that time, her short fiction won various awards, including two National Endowment of the Arts fellowships. She won the Associated Writing Programs award in 1978 and had stories in Best of Nimrod, and Best American Short Stories.

Her short fiction is collected in The Further Adventures of Brunhild, Tigers in the Wood, and Next of Kin. Doubting Castle, originally published by Shocken Books and now available from Hamilton Stone Editions, was her first venture into full-length fiction. Her first collection of poetry, The Animal Within, was published a month before her death.
