= Tropical Fish (book) =

2005 book by Doreen Baingana

- Tropical Fish by Doreen Baingana
- Author: Doreen Baingana
- Language: English
- Publisher: University of Massachusetts Press
- Publication date: 2005
- Publication place: Uganda
- Media type: Print (hardback & paperback)
- Pages: 184
- ISBN: 978-1-55849-477-0

Tropical Fish is a short story collection, published in 2005, by Ugandan author Doreen Baingana. It revolves around the lives of a family based in Entebbe, Uganda. It follows Christine, Patti and Rosa the daughters of a relatively well off family whose father, a senior government official, becomes an alcoholic and loses everything, starting with his job. Through it all the mother has to support her family on her own. It follows the lives of the three sisters. It touches religious influence in Africa, boarding school life in missionary schools, first love, superstition, inevitably AIDS, love across the colour with a sugar-daddy syndrome, the sense of alienation that comes with migrating to another country (USA), and that of displacement after coming back home. Rosa, the eldest sister, was promiscuous and died of AIDS. Patti the middle sister, became a born-again Christian. And Christine, the youngest, went to Los Angeles and came back eight years later to pick up a job amidst the struggles of discovering her inner self.

== Stories ==
Tropical Fish is a collection of eight short stories: "Green stones", "Hunger", "First Kiss", "Passion", "A thank-you note", "Tropical Fish ", "Lost in loss angeles" and "Questions of Home". The majority of the stories center on the youngest daughter, Christine.

"Tropical Fish" is about Christine's college years when she drifted into an affair with a wealthy, undemanding white man who sold tropical fish. He and his home offered her an escape from the pressures of her ordinary life. In his luxurious house, she could glory in little things, like the abundance of water coming from the tap rather than having to be carried home in a bucket. She had not wanted the man himself, but just "a few hours free from myself".

"Green Stones" is about the early lives of the Mugisha family. It focused mostly on Christine, who recounts her story of the things that fascinate her as a child.

In "Hunger", Patti is the focus of the story which is told through her diary. Patti communes with hunger at Gayaza Secondary School where she is a boarder. She nearly subdues hunger with obsessive religiosity. However, religion almost always fails her. In fighting hunger, she loses dignity.

In "First Kiss", Christine's first kiss changes everything for her; her womanhood immaturely blossoms at a pre-teen stage.

In "Lost in Los Angeles", Christine seemingly survives all to find rescue in Los Angeles. She struggles to define herself as she finds meanings to her life.

== Awards ==
- Commonwealth Writers Prize First Book Award (Africa region) in 2006.
- Associated Writers and Writing Programmes Award for short fiction.
