= Hedge relationship =

Designated link between a hedging instrument and the risk it offsets

The accounting term Hedge relationship relates to the treatment of an insurance contract for risk mitigation on an underlying asset, and the set of tests for the valuation of this insurer/insuree contract. More specifically, "Hedge relationship" describes the criteria for including the fair value of derivatives on balance sheet as part of an effort to regulate and normalize the use of hedging in corporate accounting.

The context here is that these contracts are valuable to a company, and standardized means of including their fair value on corporate balance sheets are of interest to lenders and investors. In general, the use of hedges and financial derivatives to protect against risk should reflect a fair value assessment of the hedge and should not appear as items in corporate income. For companies operating outside of the financial services sector an effective hedge should protect against undue loss without being a major component of company income statements.

To account for the value of these contracts, then, specified criteria - as noted in IAS section 39 R.88 and updated by IFRS 9 - must be met for a hedge relationship to be deemed to exist and for hedge accounting to apply: so called "hedge effectiveness". Testing must be performed on both elements of the hedge relationship to ensure that the risk mitigation value of the hedge would be effectively reflected in the insurees profit and loss ledger. "Effectiveness" measures the strength of this relationship; there are several generally accepted "measures of effectiveness":

- The "Dollar Offset Method". The method calculates the ratio: cumulative change in value of the hedging instrument over its life, compared to the same for the hedged item. Value here may be either fair value, or the present value of future expected cash flows; the modelling is usually under simulation. If the ratio is between 0.8 and 1.25 (4/5 - 5/4) under all scenarios - the "80:125 rule" - then hedge accounting may be applied.
- Regression analysis. A similar approach, but here regressing the expected changes in these values at relevant future time periods - usually financial reporting dates - so as to demonstrate the strength of the hedge-relationship. The modelling uses current market variables, such as forward rates recovered from the yield curve. Here the 80:125 rule applies to the estimated slope; additionally, for the hedge to be deemed effective, the R squared must be better than 0.8.
- "Variance-reduction test". Also a comparison of the forecast values or cash flows of the hedged item and those of the hedging instrument, but here returning:

1 - (standard deviation of the hedge instrument / standard deviation of the instrument being hedged)

== Sources ==
Resources

- Recognition of previous GAAP hedge relationship when it first applies IAS 39, Accountancy; Jun2004, Vol. 133 Issue 1330, p90-91.
- Accounting for electricity derivatives under IAS 39, Journal of Derivatives & Hedge Funds (2007) 13, 233–246.
