= Phyllis Barber =

American writer

- Born: May 11, 1943 (age 83)
- Education: Brigham Young University; San Jose State College; University of Utah; Vermont College (MFA)
- Children: 4

Phyllis Barber (born Phyllis Nelson on May 11, 1943) is a writer of fiction and non-fiction, often set in the Western United States. She was raised in Boulder City, Nevada and Las Vegas as a member of the Church of Jesus Christ of Latter-day Saints (LDS Church). She studied piano at Brigham Young University and moved to Palo Alto, California where her husband studied law at Stanford. There Barber finished her degree in piano at San Jose State College in 1967, and taught and performed piano in California. She studied creative writing at the University of Utah and received an MFA in writing from Vermont College in 1984. She started her writing career by publishing short stories in journals and magazines in the 1980s.

Barber's memoir, How I Got Cultured (1991) won the creative nonfiction award for Association of Writers & Writing Programs and the award for autobiography from the Association for Mormon Letters. How I Got Cultured was praised for how Barber describes her complex relationship to the expectations of her religion and the larger "worldly" culture of Las Vegas. Lavina Fielding Anderson described Barber's work as that of an insider describing her faith to outsiders. Barber's novel, And the Desert Shall Blossom (1989) won first prize in the Utah State Literary competition, and many of her short stories have also won awards. She taught writing at the Vermont College of Fine Arts from 1991 to 2010, and has taught other various writing workshops. In 1984, she co-founded the annual writer's conference called Writers at Work in Park City, Utah.

== Early life and education ==
Barber was born on May 11, 1943, in Rose de Lima Hospital in Basic Townsite. Her parents, Herman and Thora Nelson, raised her in Boulder City, Nevada. When she was eleven years old, her family moved to Las Vegas, Nevada. At Las Vegas High school, she was a Rhythmette and studied piano. Raised as a member of LDS Church, she continued her piano studies at Brigham Young University from 1961 to 1964 and married David Barber in 1964. They moved to Palo Alto, California so that he could study law at Stanford. Barber finished her degree in piano at San Jose State College in 1967. She performed piano professionally and gave lessons while living in Palo Alto. After taking creative writing classes at the University of Utah, she studied at Vermont College, receiving an MFA in writing in 1984.

== Writing ==
Barber's first published book was Smiley Snake's Adventure (1980), an easy reader commissioned by a small press in Provo. She published short stories in Kenyon Review, Missouri Review, Fiction International, Cimarron Review, Crazyhorse, Dialogue and Sunstone, among others. She wrote for Utah Holiday for ten years as a feature writer.

=== Process and style ===
Barber describes her writing process as being similar to learning to play a piece of music on the piano. She writes a first draft in the same way she would sight-read a new piece of music—by plowing though despite errors. She then revises the draft to make it consistent with her intentions for the piece. In 1990, Barber wrote about her difficulty in dedicating time to write when Mormon cultural demands expected her to spend her time in direct service to her family and neighbors. She uses postmodern techniques by "playing with irony, perspective, chronology, symbolism, [and] structure". She reflects that her preference for subtle, experimental stories could be linked to her feeling that women "survive by not being obvious."

=== Analysis ===
Scholar Ángel Sainz has written extensively on Phyllis Barber. He noticed that two of Barber's memoirs, How I Got Cultured and Raw Edges share the way Barber relates to the places she lives in. The borders of outside and inside are important metaphors for how Barber interacts with expectations from her church and parents about how she will live her life. Her learning to play the piano is one example; at first she is praised for her success at the piano, but when she excels in learning the piano, she becomes part of a larger musical world that take her away from her interior family and church life. While most bildungsroman novels end with some sort of closure, How I Got Cultured ends with a present-tense section that looks to the future.

Laura L. Bush noticed that Barber didn't defend or explain Mormon polygamy when two characters in her memoir joked about it; "an explicit desire to explain or defend any aspect of Mormon doctrine is absent [from How I Got Cultured.]" Contrastingly, other Mormon authors often attempt to explain or defend polygamy in their autobiographical works. In How I Got Cultured, Barber also recalled her experience of wanting to be both sexually attractive and chaste. Bush compares Barber to Terry Tempest Williams and Juanita Brooks—two other professional Mormon women autobiographers from the twentieth century who write in a literary style, with ironic chapter names and rich metaphors. Williams and Barber also share similarities in their memoirs: they reconstruct dialogue, show mistakes in government actions, and use irony to explore religious orthodoxy. Bush praised How I Got Cultured for the way it dealt with the serious issue of Mormon and Western expectations of girls and women with humor and without didacticism. Writing for Weber: The Contemporary West, Katharine Coles, an English teacher and poet, praised the way Barber described her complex relationship with her Mormon heritage, but described some of the language as "strained."

Mary Ellen Robertson, in a review for Dialogue, wrote that Parting the Veil reminded readers of their "collective belief in miracles, the potency of our oral traditions, and our persistent efforts to part the veil that separates us from the divine." In a review for the Journal of Mormon History, Eric Eliason noted that four stories in the collection were based on Mormon folklore from the Fife Folklore Archives at Utah State University. He called two of the stories "wacky," but praised the way Barber embraced Mormon folklore as part of her Mormon identity. Writing for Irreantum, Eliason described Parting the Veil as part of a Mormon magical realism movement in Mormon fiction. He compared her stories to those by Orson Scott Card and Levi Peterson, stating that their work "allows for the reality of sacred experience and the possibility of bumping into beings of light."

In 1993, Lavina Fielding Anderson discussed Barber's work in a reflective essay about the state of Mormon women's fiction. She described her work as "insider/outsider" fiction, or fiction where the author presents their Mormonism to outsiders while still being recognizable to other Mormons. Anderson praised The Desert Shall Blossom for the way Barber interpreted Mormonism; "neither pietistically nor simplistically". At 15 Bytes, Jake Clayson spoke positively of Barber's writing in her memoir To The Mountain, describing it as self-aware and disarming.

=== Awards and recognition ===
How I Got Cultured: A Nevada Memoir won the award for creative nonfiction for the Association of Writers & Writing Programs in 1991 and the Association for Mormon Letters award for autobiography in 1993. And the Desert Shall Blossom and "Criminal Justice" won first prizes in the 1988 Utah State Literary Competition. "Bird of Paradise" won third prize in the Dialogue writing awards in 1991. Barber was added to the Nevada Writers hall of fame in 2005. Her essay, "At the Cannery" won the Eugene England Memorial Essay Award from Dialogue in 2009. In 2015, she received the Smith-Pettit Foundation Award for Outstanding Contribution to Mormon Letter from the Association for Mormon Letters.

Several short stories from Barber's Parting the Veil: Stories from a Mormon Imagination won prizes before being collected. "Ida's Sabbath" won second place in the Brookie and D.K. Brown Memorial Fiction contest in 1983 and "Mormon Levis" won first place in the same contest in 1996. The 1986 Utah Fine Arts Literary Competition awarded "The Whip" second prize, and the Dialogue writing awards gave it third prize in the same year. "The Fiddler and the Wolf" won second place in the Brookie and D.K. Brown Memorial Fiction contest in 1995. "Wild Sage" was a special mention in the Pushcart Prize XIII in 1987. "Sweetgrass" was listed in "Notable Essays of 2009" and "The Knife Handler" was listed in "Notable Essays of 2010"

== Teaching and community work ==
Barber taught in the writing program at the Vermont College of Fine Arts from 1991 to 2010. She has taught small classes in how to write a memoir in Denver and Park City. She taught a class in spiritual autobiography at Lighthouse Writers in Denver, Colorado. In 1994, she taught as a visiting writer at the University of Missouri.

Together with Dolly Makoff, James Thomas, and François Camoin, Barber founded an annual writer's conference called Writers at Work in 1984. The independent writer's organization in Park City started to host workshops and competitions in 2010. As a panelist for the National Endowment for the Arts, she reviewed literary scholarship applications.

== Personal life ==
Phyllis and David Barber had four sons together. The two divorced in 1996 or 1997. Phyllis married Bill Traeger in 2000. They divorced in 2002 and remarried each other in 2010. They live in Park City, Utah. Barber left the LDS Church for twenty years and researched other faith traditions in that time, which she wrote about in her memoir.

== Works ==
This list is informed by Worldcat and Parting the Mormon Veil.

=== Memoir ===
- How I Got Cultured: A Nevada Memoir (1994)
- Raw Edges: A Memoir (2009)
- To the Mountain: One Mormon Woman's Search for Spirit (2014)

=== Short story collections ===
- The School of Love (1990)
- Parting the Veil: Stories from a Mormon Imagination (1999)

=== Novels ===
- And the Desert Shall Blossom (1991)
- The Desert Between Us (2020)

=== Children's books ===
- Smiley Snake's Adventure (1980)
- Legs: the Story of a Giraffe (1991)
