= GAAP =

GAAP or gaap may refer to:

== Accounting ==
- Generally accepted accounting principles, a standard framework of guidelines for financial accounting
  - Generally Accepted Accounting Principles (Canada)
  - Generally Accepted Accounting Practice (UK)
  - Generally Accepted Accounting Principles (United States)
  - French generally accepted accounting principles
  - Russian GAAP

== Other uses ==
- Golgi anti-apoptotic protein
- Gaap, a goetic demon
- Gruppi Anarchici d'Azione Proletaria, an anarchist grouping in 1950s Italy
