= Accounting standard =

Monetary principles in business

Publicly traded companies typically are subject to rigorous standards. Small and medium businesses often follow more simplified standards, plus any specific disclosures required by their specific lenders and shareholders. Some firms operate on the cash method of accounting which can often be simple and straightforward. Larger firms most often operate on an accrual basis. Accrual basis is one of the fundamental accounting assumptions, and if it is followed by the company while preparing the financial statements, then no further disclosure is required. Accounting standards prescribe in considerable detail what accruals must be made, how the financial statements are to be presented, and what additional disclosures are required. The term generally accepted accounting principles (GAAP) was popularized in the late 1930s.

Some important elements that accounting standards cover include identifying the exact entity which is reporting, discussing any "going concern" questions, specifying monetary units, and reporting time frames.

In the public sector, 30% of 165 governments surveyed used accrual accounting, rather than cash accounting, in 2020.

== Benefits ==
The lack of transparent accounting standards in some nations has been cited as increasing the difficulty of doing business there. In particular, the Asian financial meltdown in the late 1990s has been partially attributed to the lack of detailed accounting standards. Giant firms in some Asian countries were able to take advantage of their poorly devised accounting standards to cover up immense debts and losses, which yielded a collective effect that eventually led the whole region into financial crisis.

== Limitations ==
The notable limitations of accounting standards are their inflexibility, the time-consuming process of creating them, the difficulty of choosing between alternative treatments and their restrictive scope. Accounting standards were largely written in the early 21st century. Accounting scandals such as Worldcom and Enron illustrate that, despite all these efforts, widespread fraud can still occur, and even be missed by the outside auditors.

== Accounting standards by nation ==
- Canada – Generally Accepted Accounting Principles (Canada)
- China – Chinese Accounting Standards (Zhōngguó qǐyè kuàijì zhǔnzé 中国企业会计准则)
- France – Generally Accepted Accounting Practice (Plan Comptable Général)
- Germany – Generally Accepted Accounting Practice (Grundsätze ordnungsmäßiger Buchführung)
- India – Indian Accounting Standards (Ind_AS) can be used by any company governed by the rules and regulations of the Companies Act 2013, while Generally Accepted Accounting Principles (USA) are used by foreign and multinational companies in India
- Italy – Principi contabili nazionali
- Luxembourg – Luxembourg Generally Accepted Accounting Principles (Lux GAAP)
- Nepal – Nepal Financial Reporting Standards
- Russia – Russian GAAP
- Sweden – BAS (accounting)
- Switzerland – Swiss GAAP FER (Fachempfehlungen zur Rechnungslegung)
- Turkey – Uniform Accounting Plan (Turkey)
- United Kingdom – Generally Accepted Accounting Practice (UK)
- United States – Generally Accepted Accounting Principles (United States). Domestic firms typically report in this format. Foreign firms that trade in the U.S. typically report in IFRS format (below). Statutory accounting principles are used by insurance companies in the US.

== Global standardization and IFRS ==
Many countries use or are converging on the International Financial Reporting Standards (IFRS) that were established and are maintained by the International Accounting Standards Board. In some countries, local accounting principles are applied for regular companies but listed or large companies must conform to IFRS, so statutory reporting is comparable internationally.

All listed and grouped EU companies have been required to use IFRS since 2005. Canada moved in 2009, Taiwan in 2013, and other countries are adopting local versions.

In the United States, while "...the SEC published a statement of continued support for a single set of high-quality, globally accepted accounting standards, and acknowledged that IFRS is best positioned to serve this role..." progress is less evident.

== See also ==
- Constant item purchasing power accounting
- Convention of consistency
- Convergence of accounting standards
- Creative accounting
- Forensic accounting
- Philosophy of accounting
