= Convergence of accounting standards =

Monetary principles in business

The convergence of accounting standards refers to the goal of establishing a single set of accounting standards that will be used internationally. Convergence in some form has been taking place for several decades, and efforts today include projects that aim to reduce the differences between accounting standards.

Convergence is driven by several factors, including the belief that having a single set of accounting requirements would increase the comparability of different entities' accounting numbers, which will contribute to the flow of international investment and benefit a variety of stakeholders. Criticisms of convergence include its cost and pace, and the idea that the link between convergence and comparability may not be strong.

== Overview ==
The international convergence of accounting standards refers to the goal of establishing a single set of high-quality accounting standards to be used internationally, and the efforts of standard-setters towards achieving that goal. Convergence is taking place in various countries, with over 100 countries having made public commitments supporting convergence towards the International Financial Reporting Standards (IFRS). Efforts towards convergence include projects that aim to improve the respective accounting standards, and those that aim to reduce the differences between them.

=== European Union ===
In the European Union (EU), the European Parliament passed a regulation in July 2002 requiring companies listed in EU based stock exchanges to prepare their consolidated financial statements in accordance with the IFRS from 2005. Countries within the EU were allowed to make IFRS adoption optional for unlisted companies and for unconsolidated holding company financial statements, and were allowed to make several exceptions to IFRS adoption in 2005, for example for companies whose only listed securities were debt securities.

=== United Kingdom ===
In the United Kingdom, the IFRS was adopted beginning 2005, and, as of 2011, public companies are required to use the IFRS for their consolidated accounts. Other companies are also allowed to use the IFRS, but most have chosen not to do so, and continue to use the UK accounting standards largely developed prior to 2005. Companies deemed small under the UK Companies Act were allowed to use the Financial Reporting Standard for Smaller Entities (FRSSE) until this was withdrawn. For accounting years ending on or after 1 January 2016, FRSSE is no longer available.

For medium-sized entities that are not public companies, the Accounting Standards Board has proposed replacing the UK's generally accepted accounting principles (UK GAAP) with the Financial Reporting Standard for Medium-sized Entities (FRSME), which is based on the IFRS for Small and Medium-sized Entities.

=== United States ===
In the United States, the Financial Accounting Standards Board (FASB) is working with the International Accounting Standards Board (IASB) to reduce or eliminate the differences between United States Generally Accepted Accounting Principles (US GAAP) and the IFRS, in particular according to the convergence programme laid out by a 2006 memorandum of understanding, which was updated in 2008.

Short-term projects towards convergence between US GAAP and the IFRS involve the amendment of one of the boards' standards to better align them with the other board's, jointly issuing new standards. Some short-term projects and the corresponding actions taken are listed below.

1. Segment reporting: a new standard, IFRS 8 Segment Reporting, was issued in 2006.
2. Fair value option: US GAAP was amended to include the fair value option in 2007.
3. Joint ventures: IFRS 11 Joint Arrangements was issued in 2011.
4. Income tax: A joint exposure draft was published in 2009.

An update to the memorandum of understanding in 2008 introduced long-term convergence projects, including the following.

1. Derecognition: both boards issued amendments to their accounting standards.
2. Fair value measurement: FASB Statement No. 257 and IFRS 13 were issued in 2011.
3. Financial instruments with the characteristics of equity: a joint discussion paper was released.
4. Revenue recognition: the boards issued joint proposals in 2010.

In a joint report published in 2012, the IASB and FASB stated that most of the short-term projects outlined in the memorandum of understanding had been completed, and that greater priority was now being placed on long-term projects.

== Motivation ==
Motivations for convergence include the belief that it will result in increased comparability between financial statements, which will benefit a variety of stakeholders. For example, the FASB believes that "investors, companies, auditors, and other participants in the U.S. financial reporting system" will benefit from converged standards because it will result in increased comparability between the financial statements of different firms.

A 2008 report by PricewaterhouseCoopers (PwC) stated that convergence of accounting standards would contribute to the flow of international investment and benefit "all capital markets stakeholders" because it:

1. renders international investments more comparable to investors;
2. reduces the cost of complying with accounting requirements for global businesses;
3. potentially establishes a more transparent accounting system with greater accountability;
4. reduces "operational challenges" for accounting firms; and
5. gives standard-setters the opportunity to "improve the reporting model".

Additionally, a survey conducted by the International Federation of Accountants found that 89% of accounting profession leaders who responded expressed that convergence was either very important or important for economic growth for their respective countries.

== Criticisms ==
The goal of and various proposed steps to achieve convergence of accounting standards has been criticised by various individuals and organizations. For example, in 2006 senior partners at PricewaterhouseCoopers (PwC) called for convergence to be "shelved indefinitely" in a draft paper, calling for the IASB to focus instead on improving its own set of standards.

In particular, Shyam Sunder of the Yale School of Management has called the link between convergence and comparability "overblown", while the cost and pace of adoption have been cited as the most common criticism of the SEC's 2008 convergence roadmap, which set milestones that potentially lead to mandatory adoption of IFRS in 2014.

=== Nature of standards ===
Other criticisms center around the nature of the converged standards. For example, some critics are concerned that convergence will increase the use of fair value accounting.

Other critics have also respectively cited shortcomings with rules-based and principles-based standards as reasons. Principles-based standards allow for "different interpretations for similar transactions", and have also been described as "less precise", while rules-based standards contain more exceptions and use bright-line rules and specific details to deal with "as many potential contingencies as possible". The above-mentioned PwC senior partners expressed that convergence will lead to an accounting system that is too rules-based for non-US listed companies, while other critics conversely criticize the principles-based nature of the IFRS as making it difficult for preparers of financial statements to defend against litigation.

== History ==
=== 1950s and 1960s ===
The idea of convergence has roots in the 1950s, and was a response to greater economic integration and international capital flows after World War II . Before the 1990s, convergence took the form of harmonization, the reduction of differences between the various accounting standards used internationally.

At the 8th International Congress of Accountants hosted by the American Institute of Certified Public Accountants in 1962, many participants expressed the need for the development of accounting standards on an international basis; in the same year the AICPA reactivated the Committee on International Relations, that aimed to improve cooperation among accountants globally.

=== 1970s and 1990s ===
The International Accounting Standards Committee (IASC), the predecessor to the International Accounting Standards Board (IASB) was established in 1973 with the goal of developing accounting standards and promoting them internationally; by 1987 the IASC had issued 25 standards, and by the late 1980s there was "worldwide interest" in the need for convergence.

In 1991 the FASB formally set out the goal of developing an internationally used set of accounting standards, and in subsequent years the FASB and IASC undertook various projects to lay the groundwork for convergence. In 1996, the National Securities Markets Improvement Act became law; the act expressed support for convergence efforts and required the SEC to report to congress on progress towards convergence.

=== 2000s ===
The IASC was reconstituted into the IASB in 2001, and the FASB and IASB began working towards convergence in 2002, expressing their commitment to convergence in the Norwalk agreement and pledging to make their respective standards "compatible as soon as is practicable" and to maintain compatibility by coordinating future programs. In the European Union (EU), the European Parliament passed a regulation in July 2002 requiring companies listed in the EU to prepare their consolidated financial statements in accordance with the IFRS from 2005.

The IASB and FASB signed a memorandum of understanding in 2006 which laid guidelines on their convergence projects and set short-term goals such as to issue converged standards on business combinations by 2008. Work towards the goals were reviewed in 2008, and a progress report published that also set out subsequent steps for each convergence topic. The FASB and IASB met again in 2009 and agreed to "intensify their efforts" in working towards the goals of the memorandum of understanding, while laying down future plans and targets.

=== 2010s ===
Convergence between the IFRS and US GAAP appeared to stall in 2012, with the IASB suggesting that it would no longer seek to converge with the US GAAP. In 2013, fifteen of the largest banks in the United States, including Bank of America Corporation, Capital One Financial Corporation, Citigroup Inc., JPMorgan Chase & Co., Morgan Stanley and Wells Fargo & Company, wrote a letter to the chairmen of FASB and the IASB encouraging the boards to resolve their differences over the accounting standards for credit losses.

By 2013, over 100 jurisdictions required the use of IFRS for all or most publicly accountable entities in their capital markets, and 115 jurisdictions had made public commitments supporting the convergence of accounting standards.
