= Norwalk =

Norwalk could refer to:

== Places in the United States ==
- Norwalk, California, a suburb of Los Angeles, and the largest and most populous city named Norwalk
- Norwalk, Connecticut, a city in southwestern Connecticut that contains several neighborhoods including Central Norwalk, East Norwalk, South Norwalk, and West Norwalk
  - East Norwalk
  - The Norwalk River running through southwestern Connecticut
  - The Norwalk Harbor at the mouth of the river in southwestern Connecticut
  - The Norwalk Islands in Long Island Sound off the coast of Connecticut
  - Norwalk Community College in southwestern Connecticut
  - Norwalk Hospital in southwestern Connecticut
- Norwalk, Iowa, near Des Moines
- Norwalk Township, Pottawattamie County, Iowa
- Norwalk, Michigan, in Brown Township
- Norwalk, Ohio
- Norwalk Township, Huron County, Ohio
- Norwalk, Wisconsin

== Other uses ==
- Norwalk Hydraulic Press, a juice-making machine invented by Norman W. Walker
- Norwalk virus, the type species of the Norovirus genus
- Norwalk Agreement, an agreement between FASB and IASB

== See also ==
- Norwalk station (disambiguation)
