= Provision (accounting) =

Account which records a present liability of an entity

In financial accounting under International Financial Reporting Standards (IFRS), a provision is an account that records a present liability of an entity. The recording of the liability in the entity's balance sheet is matched to an appropriate expense account on the entity's income statement. In U.S. Generally Accepted Accounting Principles (U.S. GAAP), a provision is an expense. Thus, "Provision for Income Taxes" is an expense in U.S. GAAP but a liability in IFRS.

== Under International Financial Reporting Standards ==
In the International Financial Reporting Standards (IFRS), the treatment of provisions (as well as contingent assets and liabilities) is found in IAS 37.

== Definition ==
A provision can be a liability of uncertain timing or amount. A liability, in turn, is a present obligation of the entity arising from past events, the settlement of which is expected to result in an outflow from the entity of resources embodying economic benefits.

Though it is often thought to be a form of savings, a provision should not be considered as such. Examples of common provisions are: income tax liability, product warranty, environment restoration, etc.

== Lexicology ==
Sometimes in IFRS, but not in GAAP, the term reserve is used instead of provision. Such a use is, however, inconsistent with the terminology suggested by the International Accounting Standards Board. The term "reserve" can be a confusing accounting term. In accounting, a reserve is always an account with a credit balance in the entity's equity on the balance sheet, while to some non-accountants (e.g., actuaries), it has the connotation of money set aside to meet a future liability (a debit balance).

== Recognition ==
A provision shall be recognized if the following criteria are fulfilled:

- an entity has a present obligation as a result of a past event;
- it is probable that an outflow of resources embodying economic benefits will be required to settle the obligation;
- a reliable estimate can be made of the amount of the obligation.
- a specific current statement, the entity will accept certain responsibilities and other parties have valid expectations that the entity will discharge its responsibilities.

No provision, however, is recognized for costs that need to be incurred to operate in the future. Also, an obligation always involves another party to whom the obligation is owed (even if this party is unknown).

== Executory and onerous contracts ==
An executory contract is defined as a contract under which neither party has performed any of its obligations (e.g. delivering an object and paying for that object) or both parties have partially performed their obligations to an equal extent. In case of an executory contract, IAS 37 does not apply and neither an asset nor a liability is recorded. However, a provision needs to be recognized if the executory contract becomes onerous to the entity. An onerous contract is defined as a contract in which the unavoidable costs resulting from the entity meeting its contractual obligations exceed the economic benefits expected to be received under that contract.

== Restructuring ==
A restructuring is defined as programme that is planned and controlled by management, and materially changes either the scope of a business undertaken by an entity, or the manner in which that business is conducted. If a restructuring is anticipated, it leads to the recognition of a provision. However, that provision is subject to some specific restrictions: A restructuring provision does not include costs such as the retraining or relocating of continuing staff, marketing, or investment in new systems and distribution networks. This is because these expenditures relate to the future conduct of the business and are thus not liabilities for restructuring to be recognized at the end of the reporting period. the objectives of provision are to be for all expenses and losses even when the amount of such

== Provision for income tax (United States GAAP) ==
In American English, the word provision is used as a synonym for "expense", especially when it appears in a phrase that refers to the income tax cost incurred by a business during an income statement period. In income statements, the appearance of provision for income tax would refer to that expense.

== See also ==
- International Financial Reporting Standards
