= Indian Accounting Standards =

Accounting principles and rules

Indian Accounting Standard (Ind AS) is the accounting standard adopted by companies in India and issued under the supervision of Accounting Standards Board (ASB) which was constituted as a body in the year 1977. ASB is a committee under Institute of Chartered Accountants of India (ICAI) which consists of representatives from government department, academics, other professional bodies viz. ICAI, representatives from ASSOCHAM, CII, FICCI, etc. ICAI is an independent body formed under an act of parliament.

The Ind AS are named and numbered in the same way as the International Financial Reporting Standards (IFRS). National Financial Reporting Authority (NFRA) recommend these standards to the Ministry of Corporate Affairs (MCA). MCA has to spell out the accounting standards applicable for companies in India. As on date MCA has notified 40 Ind AS (Ind AS 11 is omitted by companies). This shall be applied to the companies of financial year 2015-16 voluntarily and from 2016 to 2017 on a mandatory basis

Based on the international consensus, the regulators will separately notify the date of implementation of Ind-AS for the banks, insurance companies etc. Standards for the computation of Tax has been notified as ICDS in February 2015.

== History ==
India followed accounting standards from Indian Generally Acceptable Accounting Principle (IGAAP) prior to adoption of the Ind-AS.

== Applicability ==
Companies shall follow Ind AS either Voluntarily or Mandatorily. Once a company follows Indian AS, either mandatorily or voluntarily, it can not revert to old method of Accounting.

=== Mandatory Applicability (1 April 16) ===
- Every Company with Net worth of not less than 500 crores (5 billion).

=== Mandatory Applicability from Accounting Period beginning on or after 1 April 2018 ===
- Every Listed Company.
- Unlisted Companies with Net worth greater than or equal to Rs. 250crore but less than Rs. 500crore(for any of the below mentioned periods).

Net worth shall be checked for the previous four Financial Years (2013–14, 2014–15, 2015–16, and 2016–17)

== List of Indian Accounting Standards ==
Ind As No.	Name of Indian Accounting Standard
Ind AS 101	First time adoption of Ind AS
Ind AS 102	Share Based Payment
Ind AS 103	Business Combination
Ind AS 104	Insurance Contracts
Ind AS 105	Non-Current Assets Held for Sales and Discontinued Operations
Ind AS 106	Exploration for and Evaluation of Mineral Resources
Ind AS 107	Financial Instruments: Disclosures
Ind AS 108	Operating Segments
Ind AS 109	Financial Instruments
Ind AS 110	Consolidated Financial Statements
Ind AS 111	Joint Arrangements
Ind AS 112	Disclosure of Interests in Other Entities
Ind AS 113	Fair Value Measurement
Ind AS 114	Regulatory Deferral Accounts
Ind AS 115	Revenue from Contracts with Customers(Applicable from April 2018)
Ind AS 116	Leases (Applicable from April 2019)
Ind AS 1	Presentation of Financial Statements
Ind AS 2	Inventories
Ind AS 7	Statement of Cash Flows
Ind AS 8	Accounting Policies, Changes in Accounting Estimates and Errors
Ind AS 10	Events occurring after Reporting Period
Ind AS 11	Construction Contracts (Omitted by the Companies (Indian Accounting Standards) Amendment Rules, 2018)
Ind AS 12	Income Taxes
Ind AS 16	Property, Plant and Equipment
Ind AS 19	Employee Benefits
Ind AS 20	Accounting for Government Grants and Disclosure of Government Assistance
Ind AS 21	The Effects of Changes in Foreign Exchange Rates
Ind AS 23	Borrowing Costs
Ind AS 24	Related Party Disclosures
Ind AS 27	Separate Financial Statements
Ind AS 28	Investments in Associates and Joint Ventures
Ind AS 29	Financial Reporting in Hyper inflationary Economies
Ind AS 32	Financial Instruments: Presentation
Ind AS 33	Earnings per Share
Ind AS 34	Interim Financial Reporting
Ind AS 36	Impairment of Assets
Ind AS 37	Provisions, Contingent Liabilities and Contingent Assets
Ind AS 38	Intangible Assets
Ind AS 40	Investment Property
Ind AS 41	Agriculture

== Provisions ==
Ind-AS is in line with the International Financial Reporting Standards (IFRS).

Ind-AS 107 deals with disclosures related to financial instruments and related risks and the policies for managing such risks.

== See also ==
- Nepal Financial Reporting Standards
