= IAS 37 =

International Accounting Standard 37: Provisions, Contingent Liabilities and Contingent Assets, or IAS 37, is an international financial reporting standard adopted by the International Accounting Standards Board (IASB). It sets out the accounting and disclosure requirements for provisions, contingent liabilities and contingent assets, with several exceptions, establishing the important principle that a provision is to be recognized only when the entity has a liability.

IAS 37 was originally issued by the International Accounting Standards Committee in 1998, superseding IAS 10: Contingencies and Events Occurring after the Balance Sheet Date, and was adopted by the IASB in 2001. It was seen as an "important development" in accounting as it regulated the use of provisions, minimising their abuse such as in the case of big baths.

== Overview ==
=== Provisions ===
IAS 37 establishes the definition of a provision as a "liability of uncertain timing or amount", and requires that all the following conditions be fulfilled before a provision can be recognized:

1. the entity currently has a liability as a result of a past event;
2. an outflow of resources is likely to be needed to settle the liability; and
3. the amount of the obligation can be estimated reliably.

The standard also details measurement methods for provisions, generally requiring that the entity recognises a best estimate of the amounts needed to settle the obligation. When the obligation is in the future, the present value is used to determine the liability. The accounting for provisions is similar to United States accounting for asset retirement obligations under ASC 410.

Contingent assets and liabilities IAS 37 generally defines contingent assets and liabilities as assets and liabilities that arose from past events but whose existence will only be confirmed by the occurrence of future events that are not in the entity's control. It establishes that contingent assets and liabilities are not to be recognized in the financial statements, but are to be disclosed where an inflow of economic benefits is probable (assets) or the chance of outflows of resources is not insignificant (liabilities).

== Recent and proposed amendments ==
In 2010 the IASB released an exposure draft of amendments to IAS 37 and invited comments on the draft. As of April 2012, the project has been paused pending other discussions. The amendments were controversial for setting out rules on how entities would account for legal cases in their financial statements; it would require firms to recognize the contingent liability as a weighted average of the possible outcomes of a legal case.

In 2018, the IASB issued an exposure draft to provide specific requirements on what constitutes 'unavoidable costs' in the definition of onerous contract in IAS 37.
