= Rangachari Sridharan =

Indian civil servant

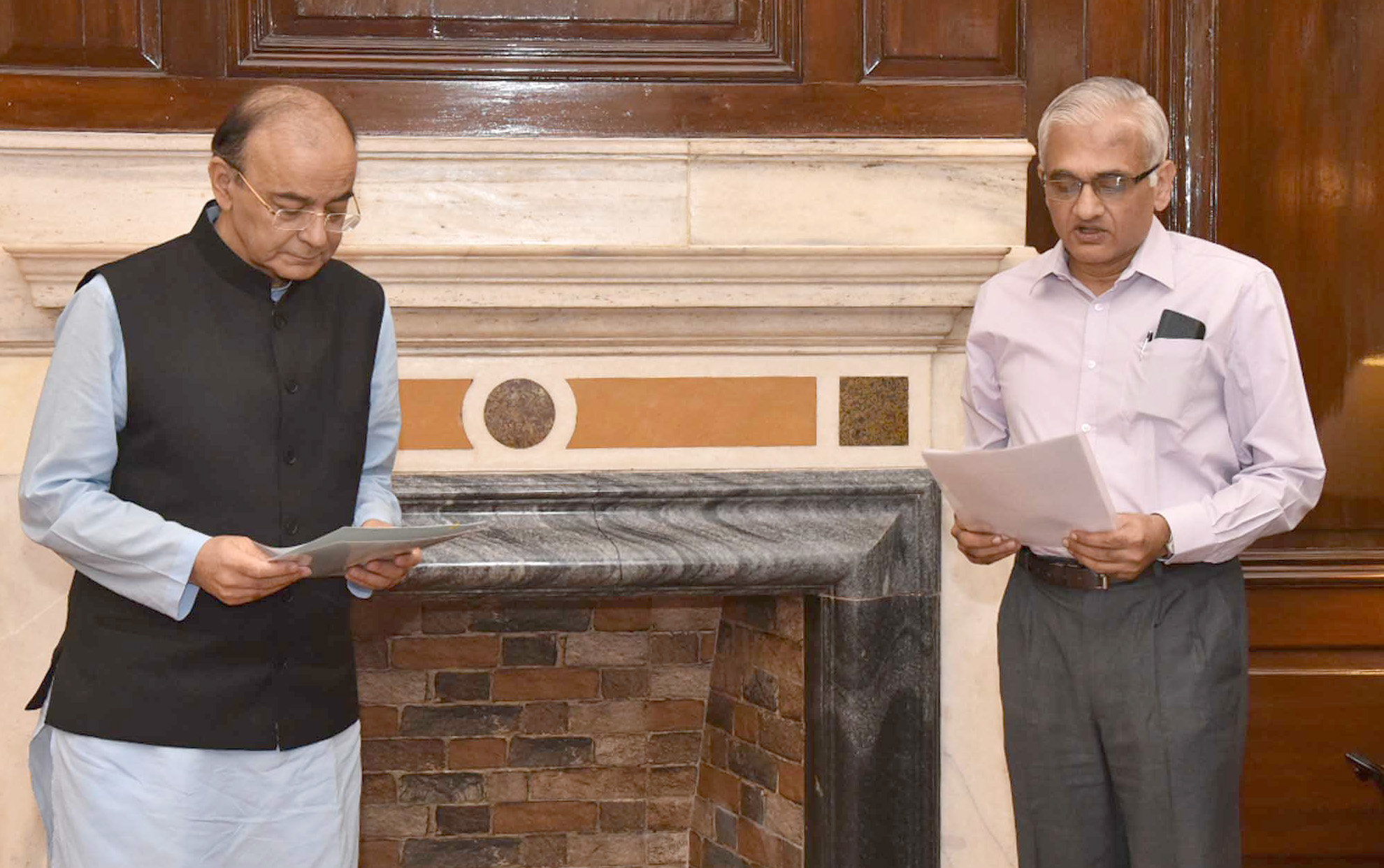
Arun Jaitley administering the oath of office and secrecy to the newly appointed chairperson, National Financial Reporting Authority (NFRA), Shri Rangachari Sridharan, in New Delhi

Rangachari Sridharan is a civil servant in the Indian Administrative Service. In March 2020, he was appointed as first chief of the National Financial Reporting Authority (NFRA).

Sridharan is a 1983 batch (retired) IAS officer of Karnataka cadre. He will hold the post of chairperson, NFRA, for three years or till he attains the age of 65 years.
