= Cost principle =

In accounting, the cost principle is part of the generally accepted accounting principles. Assets should always be recorded at their cost, when the asset is new and also for the life of the asset. For instance, land purchased for $30,000 is appraised at the much higher value because the housing market has risen, but the reported value of the land will remain $30,000.
