= Accountancy in Luxembourg =

The accounting profession in Luxembourg is structured around Ordre des Experts-Comptables (OEC) which serves as the main accounting body in the country. Luxembourg accounting standards are inspired from neighbouring France and Belgium. Similar to France, Luxembourg has set up a Commissions des Normes Comptables (CNC) which serves as an advisor to the Ministry for Justice in respect of accounting related matters, e.g. waivers for presenting consolidated accounts.

== Organisation ==
Access to the accounting profession is strictly regulated in Luxembourg. Anyone wishing to establish themselves as a chartered accountant in Luxembourg must hold a degree from the University of Luxembourg and get an authorisation to set up their business. The degree (OEC) consists of 5 exams (Tax Law, Accounting, Ethics, Labour Law, and Corporate Law) as well as a three-year traineeship in a related position, including at least one year with a qualified employer. Recognition of other national or international qualifications is possible under the mutual recognition procedure allowed by the European Union under the Bologna Process. Professional qualifications leading to recognition as a qualified auditor (Réviseur d'Entreprises Agréé) are different, although they have exams in common with the OEC degree. Both professional qualifications feature exercises and questions in French while candidates are allowed to reply in either French, German or English. OEC is under the direct stewardship of the Ministry of the Economy.

== Accounting standards ==
Applicable accounting standards in Luxembourg are interchangeably referred to as either "Luxembourg GAAP" (i.e. Generally Accepted Accounting Principles) or "Luxembourg legal and regulatory requirements" (as often disclosed in the notes to the financial statements). Lux GAAP fall under the Law of 19 December 2002 as amended, sometimes referred to as "the Accounting Law". This law lays out specific accounting principles for all the main financial statement items. Lux GAAP are notable for the many options they afford, especially in terms of asset recognition. For instance, financial assets may be recognised at either 1) acquisition or production cost, 2) fair value (as allowed under the Law of 10 December 2010 which amended the 2002 Law), 3) the lower of cost or market value, depending on financial statement line items. Since theLaw of 30 July 2013 was passed, profits arising from revaluation of assets recognised at fair value may not be distributed as dividends. The Law also defines the accounting framework applicable under Lux GAAP, especially the principles relevant to the preparation of financial statements, especially the prudence principle under which unrealised gains are not recognised except where fair value is applicable, in stark contrast to rules under International Financial Reporting Standards (IFRS).

Lawmakers in Luxembourg are especially keen on using doctrine from neighbouring France and Belgium whenever legal and regulatory requirements are unclear. International Financial Reporting Standards are also a major source of inspiration. For instance, research and development costs used not to have clear recognition principles, but it has been admitted that the usual criteria under IAS 38 could be used as guidelines for recognising intangible assets under Lux GAAP as well. IFRS have also been allowed for statutory accounts in Luxembourg, although this requires an agreement from the Luxembourg Ministry for Justice except for credit institutions, insurance companies and similar entitieswho may choose between Lux GAAP and IFRS (as adopted by the European Union) for their separate or consolidated accounts. In keeping with EU Regulation 1606/2002/EC, Luxembourg entities which issue listed securities on any European Union regulated market must present their consolidated accounts under IFRS as adopted by the European Union for financial years as from 1 January 2005.

Annual accounts presented under Lux GAAP must be filed with the Luxembourg Trade Register, also known as Registre du Commerce et des Sociétés (RCS), usually 7 months after year-end. Annual accounts presented under Lux GAAP must consist of at least a balance sheet, statement of profit and loss, and notes. Cash-flow statements are not presented under Lux GAAP in contrast to IFRS. Disclosures depend on three criteria according to which companies are classified as either "big", "medium" or "small", i.e. net turnover, balance sheet total and number of full-time employees. The latest criteria thresholds are as follows: small companies have less than €8.8 million in net turnover, less than €4.4 million in balance sheet total and less than 50 full-time employees while big companies have over €35 million in net turnover, more than €17.5 million in balance sheet total and over 250 full-time employees. Two out of those three criteria must be met for at least two consecutive years in order for the size category to apply.

For certain types of companies, different recognition criteria may apply, for instance, the option to recognise financial assets at either acquisition cost or fair value is unavailable to investment funds which must necessarily use fair value, as laid out by the Law of 17 December 2010. Tax rules significantly affect accounting practice in Luxembourg, for instance, some instruments may qualify as debt instruments under Lux GAAP while they are recognised as equity instruments above, for instance Convertible Preferred Equity Certificates (CPECs) which consist of preference shares which pay an interest to the investor but are accounted for as debt while they would typically meet the recognition criteria as an equity instrument under IAS 32. Generally speaking, substance over form has been made a non-mandatory accounting principle with the Law of 30 July 2013, and the legal substance of contracts usually takes precedence under Lux GAAP as opposed to economic substance under IFRS, similar to accounting principles in France. Similarly, legal rules applicable to companies in Luxembourg also affect accounting, especially the Law of 10 August 1915 as amended, which constitutes the main law for commercial companies. For instance, article 49 of the 1915 Law contains strict rules concerning the purchase of own shares, which translate into a specific accounting treatment whereby the own shares must be neutralised and allocated to a specific reserve.

A standard chart of account (SCA) was enacted as of 2011. It applies mostly to commercial companies, and explicitly excludes entities which are supervised by the two main Luxembourg regulators, the Commission de Supervision du Secteur Financier (CSSF) and the Commissariat aux Assurances (CAA), which are chiefly responsible for overseeing investment funds, banks, insurance companies and similar entities. All entities subject to SCA requirements must adopt the same account numbers for each financial statement element as those laid out by the SCA, and present and file accounts under a specific format referred to as electronic Centrale des Données Financières also known as "eCDF". Again, this stands in contrast to the practice in English-speaking countries where standard charts of accounts usually are specific to each company, and where professional accounting bodies are responsible for defining practical rules and the applicable accounting doctrine rather than standardisation falling to governmental bodies or lawmakers as is the case in most of Continental Europe.

== Accounting firms in Luxembourg ==
All Big Four accounting firms have a strong presence in Luxembourg, disproportionately to the number of inhabitants in the country. This is especially due to the fund industry being so developed in Luxembourg with over €3.5 trillion in assets under management as at 31 March 2015. Other notable contributors to the Luxembourg national economy are banks (approximately 140 currently operating in the country), insurance companies as well as private equity companies on top of the traditional commercial companies. Currently, PwC is the top Big Four company in Luxembourg in terms of number of employees (about 3,100) and net turnover (€500 million) in 2022. Deloitte, KPMG and Ernst & Young all have a significant presence in Luxembourg. Smaller companies are also present, such as Mazars, Grant Thornton, Alliott Group and BDO. On top of the audit industry, there are a number of service providers and trust companies notably responsible for domiciliation and accounting services, the most prominent of which include LGL Corporate Services, Intertrust, TMF, Alter Domus and Citco.
