= Jiangpu Senior High School =

School in Nanjing, China

Jiangpu Senior High School is a Chinese Senior High School based in Nanjing, China.

== History ==
Jiangpu Senior High School was founded, in Jiangsu, in Nanjing, China, in 1939. In 1980, the school was approved by Jiangsu Provincial Department of Education. It has two campuses; the new campus and wenchang campus. It is the teaching practice base of Nanjing University, Southeast University, Nanjing University of Aeronautics, Nanjing Normal University, Nanjing Audit University, Jiangsu University, and Nanjing University of Technology. During this period, the school had changed its location and name for many times. The forerunner of the school is an institution of Ministry of Education. In 1980, the school was approved by Jiangsu Provincial Department of Education that it was one of the 95 schools which were constructed by province at the first time. In 1988, the school was divided into senior high school and junior high school. In 1990, it became a dependent senior high school . In 1993, the school passed through review and acceptance by Jiangsu Province Department of Education. It was renamed to Jiangpu Senior High school on July 14, 2000, and in the same year, the school undertook to hold Xinjiang mainland class. Since, more than 100 students from Xinjiang have been enrolled every year.

== Campuses ==
There are two campuses of the school which are called new campus and wenchang campus. The school covers an area of 192969 square meters. In addition, the architecture of the school covers 666694 square meters. The school is equipped with 17 standard Physics, Chemistry and Biology laboratories as well as 7 computer rooms. All the classrooms fit out multimedia devices. Dormitories have access to air conditions. In the campus, it’s also accessible to broadcasts, televisions, telephones and network. The school library has a collection of 192205 books, e-books included.

=== New campus ===
The new campus of the school located on the foot of the LaoShan Mountain, beside the White Horse Lake. The campus covers more than 200 units and has a construction area of 50,000 square meters. It is equipped with four teaching buildings as well as a lab building and a library. In January, 2005, Jiangpu Senior High School passed an evaluation and became a four-star school. It has also been was awarded as Jiangsu province advanced moral education school.

== Qualities of school faculty ==
There are 271 members employed full-time teachers with bachelor's degree or above. Twenty of them are graduates; thirty of them are currently enrolled in Master of Education; fourteen of them are post-graduate with courses class craft. Besides, the school equipped with two special teachers and one city principle as well as national, provincial, municipal and distinct (county) outstanding educators, labor models and many teachers, a total of 150 people. Those with senior professional titles account for nearly 70% of teachers.

== Achievements ==
=== Cooperation with some universities ===
Jiangpu Senior High School is the teaching practice base of Nanjing University, Southeast University, Nanjing University of Aeronautics, Nanjing Normal University, Nanjing Audit University, Jiangsu University and Nanjing University of Technology and so on. At the same time, the school is the base of Nanjing military area commands defense student and Nanjing education scientific research.

=== Awards ===
Jiangsu Province Civilized Unit, Province Green School, Province Garden unit, Province advanced school moral education, City advanced basic-level party organization and Nanjing civilization unit and so on.

== Notable alumni ==
- Han Xiuguo, who was the vice governor of Gansu Province is the alumni in 1976.
- Zhang Xiulin, who is the alumni in 1962, is the national first-class registered architects. Also, he is one of the main designers of Shanghai Oriental Pearl TV.
