= Nanjing Audit University =

Provincial public university in Nanjing, Jiangsu, China

Coordinates: 32°02′28″N 118°44′47″E

- 南京审计大学
- Motto: 诚信求是，笃学致公
- Type: Public
- Established: 1983
- President: Lu Hualiang (陆华良)
- Party Secretary: Dong Birong (董必荣)
- Students: 15,237 total
- Location: Pukou, Nanjing, China
- Campus: Urban and Suburban
- Colors: Prussian blue NAU-Red; NAU-Green
- Website: nau.edu.cn

Nanjing Audit University (NAU; 南京审计大学) is a national public university in Nanjing, Jiangsu, China. It is affiliated with the Province of Jiangsu, and co-sponsored by the provincial government, Ministry of Education, Ministry of Finance, and National Audit Office.

The university was founded in 1983 and has an emphasis on economics and management, and also offers courses in law, languages, literature, science, and engineering. There are more than 15,000 students on two campuses: Mochou Campus (named after nearby Mochou Lake) in Gulou, Pukou Campus on the southern slope of Mount Lao.

== History ==
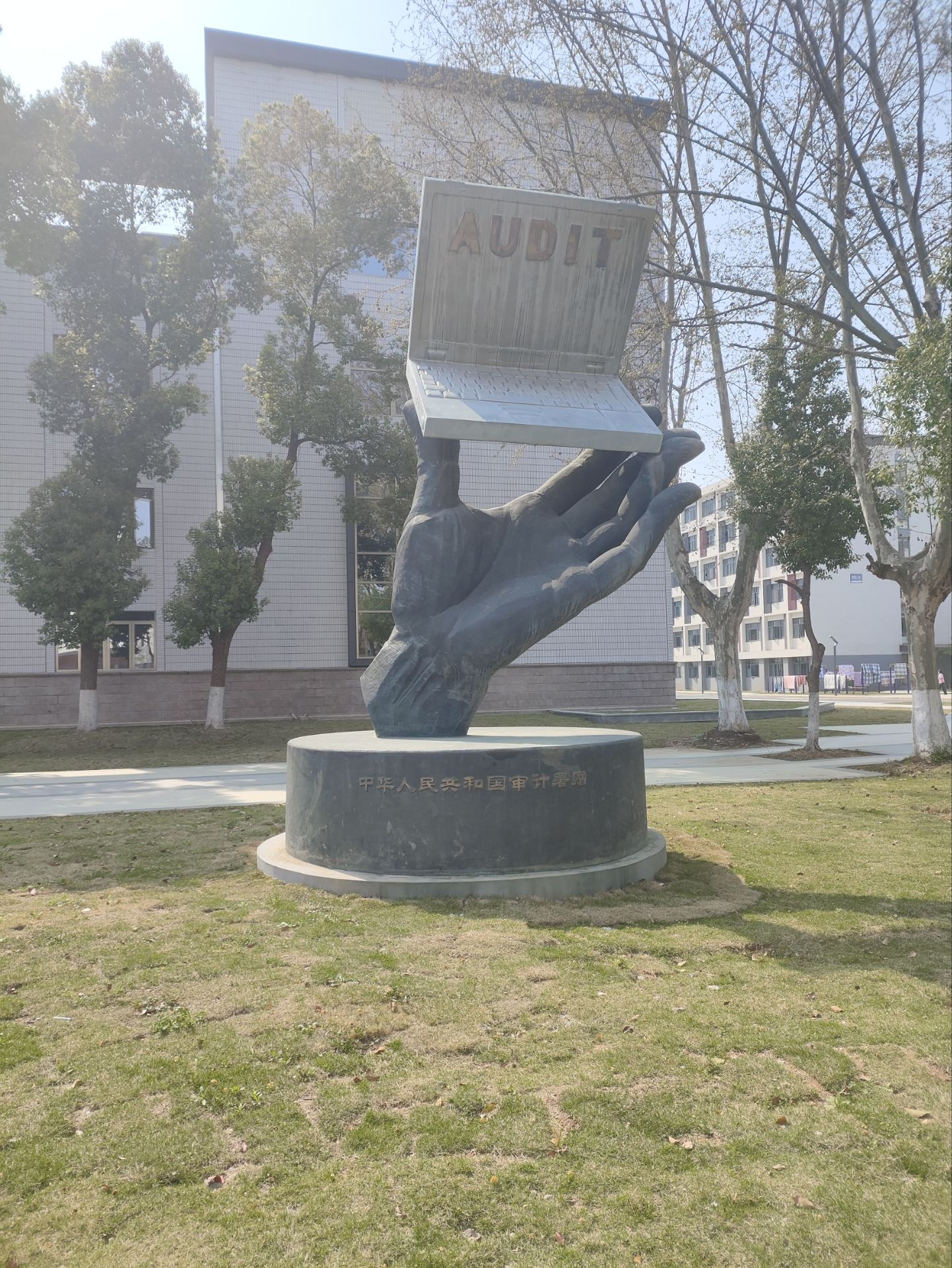
The sculpture presented to Nanjing Audit University by National Audit Office (China) is now located at Mochou Campus

- August 1983. Nanjing School of Finance and Trade was established under the approval of Jiangsu Provincial Government. Under the supervision of Nanjing Municipal Government, the school was a vocational one, offering 2 to 3 years of certificate training.
- May 1987. Nanjing School of Finance and Trade was transferred to be jointly administered by Chinese National Audit Office(CNAO), Nanjing Municipal Government and Jiangsu Education Committee. In the same year, it was renamed as Nanjing Audit Institute.
- December 1990. Nanjing Audit Institute was under the direct leadership of CNAO and jointly administration of CNAO, Jiangsu Provincial Government and Nanjing Municipal Government with CNAO the major supervisor. The institute is still of technical academy level and enrolls students from all over China.
- February 1993. Nanjing Audit Institute was enhanced to a university.
- June 1997. Under the approval of Jiangsu Degree Committee, Nanjing Audit Institute was licensed to award BA degree.
- February 2000. Nanjing Audit Institute was transferred to be under the direct leadership of Jiangsu Education Committee.
- April 2002. Under the approval of Jiangsu Provincial Government, Nanjing College of Finance was merged into Nanjing Audit Institute, thus the new Nanjing Audit University was born.
- August 2011. the Ministry of Education, the Ministry of Finance, the National Audit Office and the People's Government of Jiangsu Province construct Nanjing Audit University together.
- 2015, the university changed its name from Nanjing Audit College to Nanjing Audit University.

== Schools and departments ==
NAU has many areas of specialisation:

- School of International Auditing
- School of Accounting
- School of Finance
- School of Economics
- School of Management
- School of Information Science
- School of Law and Politics
- College of Auditing and Evaluation
- Department of Foreign Languages
- Department of Teaching Chinese As a Foreign Language
- Department of Applied Mathematics
- Physical Education Department
- School of Administration (Adult education, Vocational Technology)
- Jinshen College

NAU was also one of the first educations institutions to offer courses in e-commerce.

Since 1998 it has an affiliation and cooperation with the Association of Chartered Certified Accountants (ACCA) to promote international CPAs.

== Partner Universities ==
(In no particular order)

- Skema Business School
- Curtin University
- University of Western Australia
- University of Pécs
- University of Birmingham
- Queen's University Belfast
- ISCAE
- Yeungjin College
- University of Pretoria
- University of Pisa
- University of Freiburg

== See also ==
- Chinese Institute of Certified Public Accountants
- China Accounting Standards
- National Audit Office (China)
