= Andreas Barckow =

German accountant

Chairman of the International Accounting Standards Board
- Incumbent
- Assumed office 1 July 2021
- Preceded by: Hans Hoogervorst

Personal details
- Education: University of Paderborn
- Occupation: Accountant

Andreas Barckow is the chairman of the International Accounting Standards Board (IASB). He became chairman of the IASB on 1 July 2021. He was previously the President of the Accounting Standards Committee of Germany. He previously worked for Deloitte. Upon becoming IASB chairman he stated that his top priorities are accounting for intangible assets and addressing sustainability and ESG issues. In 2025, it was announced that Barckow would leave the role at the end of his first term in June 2026.
