= Generally Accepted Accounting Principles (Canada) =

Accounting standards of Canada

Generally Accepted Accounting Principles (GAAP) (Note: Also known as Canadian GAAP or GAAP (Canada).) of Canada provided the framework of broad guidelines, conventions, rules and procedures of accounting. In early 2006, the AcSB decided to completely converge Canadian GAAP with international GAAP, i.e. International Financial Reporting Standards (IFRS), as set by the International Accounting Standards Board (IASB), for most entities that must follow AcSB standards. For publicly accountable enterprises, IFRS became mandatory in Canada for fiscal periods beginning after January 1, 2011. Privately accountable enterprises had the option of adopting IFRS, or a new set of standards called Accounting Standard for Private Enterprises (ASPE).

== History ==
In Canada, professional development paralleled that of the United States. In 1936, the Terminology Committee of the Canadian Institute of Chartered Accountants (CICA) formed and was asked to take steps to encourage greater uniformity in the use of accounting terms by its members. In 1939, the establishment of a joint research program with Queen's University culminated in the establishment in 1946 of the Accounting and Auditing Research Committee. The aim of the committee was to improve the quality of judgement exercised in both accounting and auditing and to provide guidelines for communicating financial information and economic facts and for auditing procedures and techniques.

In 1973, the Accounting and Auditing Research Committee (AARC) gave way to two new committees – the Accounting Research Committee (ARC) and the Auditing Standards Committee (ASC). A deviation from prior policy was the invitation to other organizations to participate in ARC work by appointing up to six of its proposed members. The chief aim of the expanded structure is to continue the search for ways of increasing the thrust and scope of accounting and auditing research. In 1982, ARCs name was changed to the Accounting Standards Committee (ASC) and in 1991 to the Accounting Standards Board (AcSB).

For a number of years prior to 1968, the Research Committee issued bulletins on financial disclosure, accounting principles, terminology, reporting and auditing procedures. In 1968, these bulletins were consolidated to form a major part of the CICA Handbook. Since 1968, the Handbook has been constantly updated by inclusion of approved exposure drafts on various current topics.

The handbook is currently updated by a number of groups, including the AcSB for profit and not for profit organizations, the Public Sector Accounting Standards board for the public sector, and the Auditing Standards Board for the auditing sections.

== Influences ==
To develop financial accounting in Canada a group of organizations influence its evolution: The Canadian Institute of Chartered Accountants (CICA), the Certified General Accountants (CGA), the Society of Management Accountants of Canada (CMA), and the Canadian Academic Accounting Association (CAAA).

These groups' activities have shaped accounting thought through:

1. Education programs;
2. Publication of journals; and
3. Sponsorship and publication of special studies and research monographs

Particularly active in monograph publication is the Canadian Certified General Accountants' Research Foundation incorporated in 1979 to foster and promote the advancement of education and research in accounting. The association also publishes the GAAP Guide, which summarizes and compares Canadian, United States and international accounting standards.

== See also ==
- Generally Accepted Accounting Principles
