= Russian Accounting Standards =

Accounting standards of Russia

Russian Accounting Standards (RAS; Russian: Российские стандарты бухгалтерского учёта, РСБУ), also called Russian Accounting Principles (RAP) or Russian GAAP or GAAP (Russia), refer to the body of regulatory documents concerning financial accounting and reporting standards in the Russian Federation.

For historical reasons, the Russian Accounting Standards framework has been determined by the state, rather by professional bodies. The primary users of RAS are state and tax authorities, rather than management or third parties. RAS financial statements must include balance sheet, income statement, statement of changes in equity, cash flow statement and explanatory notes. Under RAS, a specific layout is mandatory for the balance sheet and other statements.

The Russian government has been striving to harmonize Russian Accounting Standards with IFRS since 1998. The Law No. 208-FZ introduced IFRS into Russian legislation in 2010. Since 2012, IFRS have increasingly been adopted in Russia, and they are mandatory for consolidated financial statements, while standalone financial statements must be prepared using RAS. IFRS statements are also required for domestic public companies. IFRS are generally deemed more relevant to the needs of investors.

== Comparison to IFRS ==
Major reasons for deviation between Russian GAAP and IFRS / US-GAAP (e.g. when the Russian affiliate of a larger group need to be consolidated to the mother company) are the following:

1. Booking of payables in the general ledger according to national accounting standards can only be made upon receipt of the actual acceptance protocol (good's receipt). Indeed, in Russia, in contrast to IFRS and US-GAAP, the invoice (outgoing or incoming) is not an official tax or accounting document and does not trigger any booking. There is also no provision to book in the General Ledger any expense for goods and services that according to a contract are effectively received but for whom documents are still not exchanged.
2. There is no possibility under Russian GAAP to recognise the good-will as an intangible asset in the balance sheet of a company. This has a major consequence when a company is sold. Indeed, if a company (or part of it) is sold at a higher value than its book value (i.e. to account for the good-will value), the selling party need to pay tax at the relevant profit tax rate (20% in 2013) on the difference in value between selling and accounting value and the buyer has no possibility to amortize the cost and deduct it from present and future revenues.
3. There is no equivalent of IAS 37 in the Russian GAAP. Loans and monetary securities are not discounted, so the present value of such financial assets is not discounted for the relevant interest rates at the different maturities of the loans.
