= Chinese Institute of Certified Public Accountants =

Chinese accounting organization

The Chinese Institute of Certified Public Accountants (CICPA) is a professional accounting organization based in Beijing with oversight responsibility for accountants in China. It is the third-largest professional accounting body in the world.

The Chinese Institute of Certified Public Accountants (CICPA) is an organization under the guidance of the Ministry of Finance and the State Council. Founded in November 1988 in accordance with The Law of the People’s Republic of China for Certified Public Accountants and The Regulations for the Registration and Administration of Social Organizations, the CICPA exercises the professional management and service functions by virtue of the powers vested in The Law of the People’s Republic of China for Certified Public Accountants, stipulated by The Charter of the Chinese Institute of Certified Public Accountants and the duties assigned by the Ministry of Finance.

== Presidents ==
- Yang Jiwan (Professor), (楊紀琬), founding president.

== Duties and responsibilities ==
1. To examine and approve applications for CICPA membership, and provide guidance to the local institutes of CPAs on membership registration;
2. To develop professional standards and rules for CPAs, monitor and review their implementation;
3. To conduct annual quality assurance program for individual CPA sand accounting firms;
4. To formulate professional regulatory rules and take disciplinary actions against those with non-compliant activities;
5. To organize National Unified CPA Examinations;
6. To organize and deliver training programs for members;
7. To organize professional exchanges, conduct theoretical research and provide technical support;
8. To give publicity to the accountancy profession;
9. To promote relationships within and beyond the accountancy profession, support CPAs to adhere to the laws in conducting their practices and safeguard the legitimate rights and interests of members;
10. To represent the Chinese accountancy profession in carrying out international co-operations and exchanges;
11. To give guidance to the work of local institutes of CPAs;
12. To conduct other relevant work stipulated by laws and regulations, and entrusted or authorized by government agencies.

== Structure ==
The highest authority of the CICPA is the National Assembly of Delegates, through which the Council is elected. The Council elects a President, a certain number of Deputy Presidents and the Executive Committee. Special Committees and Professional Committees are set up under the Council. The Executive Committee exercises the powers and duties of the Council when the Council is not in session. The secretariat is the operational office of the CICPA.

So far, there are 12 Special Committees and 1 Professional Committee under the Council. The Special Committees include the Strategy Committee, the Information Committee, the Auditing Standards Committee, the Code of Ethics Committee, the Finance Committee, the Disciplinary Committee, the Appeal and Member Rights Committee, the Education and Training Committee, the Registration Administration Committee, the Practicing Liability Appraisal Committee, the Steering Committee for Governance of Accounting Firms, the Editorial Committee of The Chinese CPA Magazine and the Professional and Technical Guidance Committee.

== Institute Secretariat ==
The CICPA secretariat has 14 departments, including 2 General Offices, Examination Department (also the Office of the CPA Examination Committee of the Ministry of Finance), Registration Department, Continuing Professional Development Department, Quality Assurance Department, Professional Standards and Technical Guidance Department, Research and Development Department, International Affairs Department, Finance Department, Editorial Office of Chinese CPA Magazine, Information Technology Department, Human Resources Department and Administration Department

== Development ==
As of 31 December 2020, the CICPA has 9,800 group members, approximately 280,000 individual members, with 110,000 practicing members and 170,000 non-practicing members. There are about 300,000 accounting professionals and providing services for more than 4.2 million enterprises.

As of 31 December 2023, the CICPA has 10,665 group members, over 360,000 individual members, with 102,017 practicing members and 262,514 non-practicing members. There are about 400,000 accounting professionals and providing services for more than 4.2 million enterprises.

== Membership within the International Accounting Federations ==
CICPA became a member of the Confederation of Asian and Pacific Accountants (CAPA) and the International Federation of Accountants (IFAC) in October 1996 and May 1997 respectively, and has developed friendly cooperation and communications with more than 50 professional accountancy organizations in other jurisdictions.

== See also ==
- Chinese accounting standards
- Insurance industry in China
