= Norwalk station =

Norwalk station may refer to:

- Norwalk station (Los Angeles Metro), a Los Angeles Metro Rail station in Norwalk, California, United States
- Norwalk/Santa Fe Springs station, a Metrolink commuter rail station in Norwalk, California, United States
- South Norwalk station, a Metro-North commuter rail station and transportation hub in Norwalk, Connecticut, United States
- East Norwalk station, a Metro-North commuter rail station in Norwalk, Connecticut, United States
