= Bilanzrechtsmodernisierungsgesetz =

German law

BilMoG

Germany
- Long title: Bilanzrechtsmodernisierungsgesetz
- Enacted: 2010

Summary
- Emphasizes that the supervisory board has to (1) guarantee the effectiveness internal control system of a firm, (2) check the internal audit function and (3) evaluate the risk management system

The German Bilanzrechtsmodernisierungsgesetz (short: BilMoG) is a German accounting law reform act usually first applied in fiscal year 2010. It emphasizes that the supervisory board has to (1) guarantee the effectiveness internal control system of a firm, (2) check the internal audit function and (3) evaluate the risk management system.

The Bilanzrechtsmodernisierungsgesetz constitutes one of the most far-reaching reforms of German commercial accounting law under the Handelsgesetzbuch (HGB) in recent decades. The Act entered into force in May 2009 and was primarily aimed at modernising and deregulating statutory accounting rules, with a particular focus on reducing administrative burdens for small and medium-sized enterprises. This objective was pursued mainly through exemptions and simplifications in accounting and disclosure requirements.

Key elements of the reform included an increase in the size thresholds that determine the classification of companies, allowing a greater number of entities to benefit from simplified accounting rules. In addition, publication and disclosure obligations were partially deregulated, although tax-related bookkeeping requirements remained unaffected. The reform also sought to simplify the interaction between commercial and tax accounting, while abolishing several accounting and valuation options that had previously existed under German commercial law.

By eliminating numerous accounting options, adjusting recognition and measurement rules, and abandoning the principle of reverse authoritative linkage (umgekehrte Maßgeblichkeit), the BilMoG brought German commercial financial statements closer to international accounting standards.

At the same time, German courts have clarified that the traditional principle of authoritative linkage between commercial and tax accounts continues to apply where no overriding tax law provisions exist. In a 2019 decision, the Federal Fiscal Court (Bundesfinanzhof) confirmed that, despite the changes introduced by BilMoG, commercial accounting values remain decisive for tax accounting purposes, including the valuation of provisions, insofar as tax law does not provide specific rules to the contrary.

== External resources ==
- Original law (in German): Bundesgesetzblatt Jahrgang 2009 Teil I Nr. 27
