= Chinese accounting standards =

Accounting rules used in mainland China

Chinese accounting standards are the accounting rules used in mainland China. As of February 2010, the Chinese accounting standard systems is composed of Basic Standard, 38 specific standards and application guidance.

Chinese accounting standards are unique because they originated in a socialist period in which the state was the sole owner of industry. Therefore, unlike Western accounting standards, they were less a tool of profit and loss, but an inventory of assets available to a company. In contrast to a Western balance sheet, Chinese accounting standards did not include an accounting of the debts that a corporation holds, and were less suitable for management control than for accounting for tax purposes.

This system of accounting was widely considered to be unsuitable for managing corporations in a market economy. In 2006, the Chinese government introduced a revised accounting law. This was the fruit of considerable discussion and protracted debate, involving the Ministry of Finance, members of the International Accounting Standards Board (IASB) and representatives of some Chinese firms.

This revised law marked a large step forward for the continuing integration of world trade and capital markets, with China adopting a significant number of the accounting standards laid out by the International Accounting Standards Board. The old Chinese Accounting Standards (CAS) were largely replaced by the International Financial Reporting Standards (IFRS), to bring China more in line with the rest of the world. The similarity between the new Chinese accounting standards and the IFRS is almost 90–95%.

This has proven to be a massive undertaking. As a consequence Chinese companies who offer shares for sale in the United States used to be required to prepare three sets of statements, one using Chinese accounting standards (China GAAP), one using international standards (IFRS), and one using North American GAAP standards (US GAAP). However, since 2008 the U.S. Securities and Exchange Commission (SEC) allows foreign private issuers to use financial statements prepared in accordance with IFRS.

== See also ==
- Chinese Institute of Certified Public Accountants
