= Norwalk Agreement =

Memorandum of Understanding

Norwalk Agreement refers to a Memorandum of Understanding signed in September 2002 between the Financial Accounting Standards Board (FASB), the US standard setter, and the International Accounting Standards Board (IASB). The agreement is so called as it was reached in Norwalk.

The Agreement was a significant step towards the US formalising its commitment to the convergence of US GAAP and International Financial Reporting Standards.

In the Press Release that announced the Agreement, Robert H. Herz, chairman of the FASB commented “The FASB is committed to working toward the goal of producing high quality reporting standards worldwide to support healthy global capital markets”.

The Agreement set out a number of initiatives, including a move to eliminate minor differences between US and international standards, a decision to align the two Boards’ future work programmes and a commitment to work together on joint projects.
