= Convention of consistency =

Principle of accounting

In accounting, the convention in consistency is a principle that the same accounting principles should be used for preparing financial statements over a number of time periods. This enables the management to draw important conclusions regarding the working of the concern over a longer period. It allows a comparison in the performance of different periods. If different accounting procedures and processes are used for preparing financial statements of different years then the results will not be comparable because these will be based on different postulates.

== Alterations in procedure ==
The concept of consistency does not mean that no change should be made in accounting procedures. There should always be a scope for improvement but the changes should be notified in the statements. The impact of changes of procedures should be clearly stated. It will enable the readers to analyze information according to new procedures. In the absence of any information regarding the change, it will be presumed that old methods have been used this time also.

Whenever consistency is not followed, this fact may be fully disclosed. For example, if a change in the method of charging depreciation is made or a change is made in the method of allocating overhead expenses to different products, a foot note to the financial statements should be given indicating the extent of change. If possible, net monetary effect of these changes should also be given.

== Types of consistency ==
Consistency may be of three types:

1. Vertical consistency
2. Horizontal consistency
3. Third dimensional consistency

The vertical consistency is maintained within inter-related financial statements of the same period. If a change has been made in dealing with two aspects of the same statement then it will be vertical inconsistency. For example, if one method of depreciation is used while preparing profit and loss account and another method is followed while preparing balance sheet, it will be a case of vertical inconsistency. When figures of one financial year are compared with the figures of another financial year of the same organization it will be a case of horizontal consistency. Third dimensional consistency will arise when financial statements of two different organizations, in the same industry, are compared.
