= National Financial Reporting Authority =

Auditing authority in India

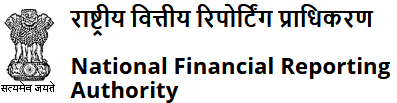

Agency overview
- Formed: 1 October 2018; 7 years ago
- Jurisdiction: Statutory Body
- Agency executive: Nitin Gupta, Chairperson
- Website: nfra.gov.in

National Financial Reporting Authority (NFRA) is the auditing and accounting supervision authority of India.

The authority oversees the auditing profession and the Indian Accounting Standards under the Companies Act 2013. It was formed in October 2018. The chairperson since July 2025 is Nitin Gupta.

== History ==
After the Satyam scandal took place in 2009, the Standing Committee on Finance proposed the concept of the National Financial Reporting Authority (NFRA) for the first time in its 21st report. Companies Act 2013, then gave the regulatory framework for its composition and constitution. The Union Cabinet approved the proposal for its establishment on 1 March 2018. It is hoped that the establishment of NFRA as an independent regulator for the auditing profession will improve the transparency and reliability of financial statements and information presented by listed companies and large unlisted companies in India.

== Powers & duties ==
According to Section 132 of the Companies Act 2013, "NFRA is responsible for recommending accounting and auditing policies and standards in the country, undertaking investigations, and imposing sanctions against defaulting auditors and audit firms in the form of monetary penalties and debarment from practice for up to 10 years."

Pursuant to the NFRA Rules, 2018, the powers of the NFRA were extended to include the governing of auditors of companies listed in any stock exchange, in India or outside of India, unlisted public companies above certain thresholds, and other companies specified in Rule 3 (1) therein.

Rules 7 and 8 allow for the monitoring of accounting and auditing professionals of the companies referred to in Rule 3 (1).

Companies under Rule 3 (2) and 3 (3) are required to disclose information of their auditors to the NFRA through form NFRA-1.

== See also ==
- Public Company Accounting Oversight Board (PCAOB)
- List of financial supervisory authorities by country
