= Nepal Financial Reporting Standards =

Nepalese accounting standards

Nepal Financial Reporting Standards (NFRS) are designed as a common global language for business affairs so that company accounts are understandable and comparable within Nepal. The rules are to be followed by accountants to maintain books of accounts which are comparable, understandable, reliable and relevant to users internal or external.

== Objective of financial statements ==
Financial statements are a structured representation of the financial positions and financial performance of an entity. The objective of financial statements is to provide information about the financial position, financial performance and cash flows of an entity that is useful to a wide range of users in making economic decisions.

To meet this objective, financial statements provide information about an entity's:

- assets;
- liabilities;
- equity;
- income and expenses, including gains and losses;
- contributions by and distributions to owners in their capacity as owners;
- cash flows

This information, along with other information in the notes, assists users of financial statements to predict the entity's future cash flows and, in particular, their timing and certainty.

The following are the general features in NFRS:

- Fair presentation and compliance with NFRS:

Fair presentation requires the faithful representation of the effects of the transactions, other events and conditions in accordance with the definitions and recognition criteria for assets, liabilities, income and expenses set out in the Framework of NFRS.

- Going concern:

Financial statements are present on a going concern basis unless management either intends to liquidate the entity or to cease trading, or has no realistic alternative but to do so.

- Accrual basis of accounting:

An entity shall recognise items as assets, liabilities, equity, income and expenses when they satisfy the definition and recognition criteria for those elements in the Framework of NFRS.

- Materiality and aggregation:

Every material class of similar items has to be presented separately. Items that are of a dissimilar nature or function shall be presented separately unless they are immaterial.

- Offsetting

Offsetting is generally forbidden in NFRS.

- Frequency of reporting:

NFRS requires that at least annually a complete set of financial statements is presented.

- Comparative information:

NFRS requires entities to present comparative information in respect of the preceding period for all amounts reported in the current period's financial statements. In addition comparative information shall also be provided for narrative and descriptive information if it is relevant to understanding the current period's financial statements.

- Consistency of presentation:

NFRS requires that the presentation and classification of items in the financial statements is retained from one period to the next unless: (a) it is apparent, following a significant change in the nature of the entity's operations or a review of its financial statements, that another presentation or classification would be more appropriate having regard to the criteria for the selection and application of accounting policies. (b) an NFRS standard requires a change in presentation.

https://en.ican.org.np/site/show/nfrs-2018

== Applicability ==
The applicability depends upon the nature of entity. However NFRS-9, Financial Instrument shall be applicable with effect from 16 July 2015 onwards.

Type

Category A – from FY 2014–15

- Listed Multinational Manufacturing Companies
- Listed State Owned Enterprises (SOEs) with minimum paid up capital of Rs. 5 billion (except Banks and Financial Institutions under BAFIA Act, 2006)

Category B – from FY 2015–16

- Commercial Banks, including State Owned Commercial Banks;
- All other Listed State Owned Enterprises (SOEs)

Category C – from FY 2016–17

- All other Financial Institutions not covered under A & B above
- All other SOEs
- Insurance Companies
- All other Listed Companies
- All other Corporate Bodies/Entities not defined as SMEs or entities having borrowing with minimum of Rs. 500 million.

Category D – from FY 2016–17

- SMEs as defined and classified by ASB

== See also ==
- Institute of Chartered Accountants of Nepal
- List of International Financial Reporting Standards
- Philosophy of Accounting
- International Public Sector Accounting Standards
