= French generally accepted accounting principles =

Accounting principles and rules

The French generally accepted accounting principles, called Plan Comptable Général (PCG) is defined by the regulation n°2014-03 written by the Authority of Accounting Rules (Autorité des normes comptables, abbr. ANC), validated by the Minister of the Budget. The Authority of Accounting Rules was created by the ordonnance no 2009-79 and combines the functions of the prior CRC and CNC.

== Content ==
- Review of the subjects and principles of accountancy;
- Definitions of the main concepts: balance sheet, income statement and annexes, liability and asset, income, loss and profit, and a presentation of accountancy and valuation rules;
- List of account maintenance rules and accounts nomenclature;
- Description of various accounting documentation;
- Summary of special accounting rules.

== Accounts classification ==
Balance Sheet Accounts					Profit and Loss Accounts		Special Accounts
Class 1	Class 2	Class 3	Class 4	Class 5	Class 6	Class 7	Class 8
Equity and Liabilities Accounts	Asset Accounts	Inventory Accounts	Third-Party Accounts	Financial Accounts	Expense Accounts	Revenues Accounts	Special Accounts
10. Capital and reserves	20. Intangible assets		40. Providers	50. Securities	60. Purchases (except 603); 603. Stocks variation	70. Finished goods sales	Non '1 to 7' classes
11. Accumulated retained earnings	21. Tangible assets	31. Raw materials (and furnitures)	41. Customers	51. Banks and financial organizations	61. External Services	71. Finished goods	
12. Profit or loss for the financial year	22. Assets under concessions	32. Others Materials	42. Employees	52. Treasury tools	62. Other external services	72. Works capitalised (in asset)	
13. Equipment grants	23. Asset under construction	33. Work-in progress goods	43. Social costs	53. Petty-cash	63. Taxes		
14. Regulated provision		34. Work-in progress services	44. Tax authority	54. Imprest accounts	64. Employees costs	74. Production grants	
15. Accruals		35. Stocks					
16. Loans and debts
17. Debts linked to shareholdings	27. Other financial assets	37. Resaling Stocks	47. Suspense accounts		67. Exceptional costs	77. Exceptional revenues	
18. Liaison accounts for shareholding companies	28. Assets depreciations		48. Regularisation accounts	58. Internal Transfer	68. Depreciations and accruals	78. Write-back on depreciation and provisions	
	29. Impairments	39. Stocks Depreciation	49. Third-Party accounts Depreciation	59. Financial accounts Depreciation	69. Employees profit-sharing - Earnings Tax	79. Costs transfers	
