= International Accounting Standards Board =

International organization

The International Accounting Standards Board (IASB) is the independent accounting standard-setting body of the IFRS Foundation.

The IASB was founded on April 1, 2001, as the successor to the International Accounting Standards Committee (IASC). It is responsible for developing International Financial Reporting Standards (IFRS) and for promoting their use and application.

== Background and semantics ==
The International Accounting Standards Committee (IASC) had been established in 1973 and had issued a number of standards known as International Accounting Standards (IAS). As the organization was reformed in 2001, it changed the name of the standard-setting body from IASC to IASB, and established a foundation to oversee it, initially known as the IASC Foundation and renamed the IFRS Foundation in mid-2010. Also in 2001, it was decided that newly issued standards would be labeled IFRS instead of IAS, and that the entire set of IASC/IASB standards (including the IAS issued until 2001 and the IFRS issued since then) would also be known as IFRS.

In 2021, The IFRS Foundation introduced a new semantic twist as it decided to establish the International Sustainability Standards Board (ISSB) as a sister standard-setter to the IASB. Under the new terminology, IFRS consist of the combination of accounting standards issued by the IASB and of sustainability-related standards issued by the ISSB. The former are still labeled IFRS (or IAS for those issued before 2001), and the latter are labeled IFRS-S (with the last "S" for Sustainability). The entire set of standards, including IFRS and IFRS-S, is also collectively referred to as IFRS.

== Members ==
The IASB originally had 14 full-time Board members, each with one vote. They are selected as a group of experts with a mix of experience of standard-setting, preparing and using accounts, market/financial regulation and academic work as well as from diverse geographical backgrounds. At their January 2009 meeting, the Trustees of the Foundation concluded the first part of the second Constitution Review, announcing the creation of a Monitoring Board and the expansion of the IASB to 16 members and giving more consideration to the geographical composition of the IASB. After the Trustees’ Review of Structure and Effectiveness in 2015, the number of members were in 2016 again set to 14 members.

The IFRS Interpretations Committee has 15 members. It is the IASB's interpretative body and its brief is to provide timely guidance on application issues that arise in practice.

A unanimous vote is not necessary in order for the publication of a Standard, exposure draft, or final "IFRIC" Interpretation. The Board's 2016 Constitution states that the publication of an Exposure Draft, or an IFRS Standard (including an IAS Standard or an IFRIC Interpretation of the Interpretations Committee) shall require approval by eight members of the Board, if there are 13 members or fewer, or by nine members if there are 14 members. Other decisions of the Board, including the publication of a Discussion Paper, shall require a simple majority of the members of the Board present at a meeting that is attended by at least 60 per cent of the members of the Board, in person or by telecommunications.

As of March 2021, the members included:

- Andreas Barckow (Chair), Germany
- Sue Lloyd (Vice-chair)
- Nick Anderson, UK, Janus Henderson Investor
- Tadeu Cendon, Brazil
- Zach Gast, US
- Jianqiao Lu, China
- Bruce Mackenzie, South Africa
- Bertrand Perrin, France
- Tom Scott, Canada
- Rika Suzuki, Japan
- Ann Tarca, Australia
- Mary Tokar, US

Former IASB members include James J. Leisenring, Robert P. Garnett (formerly Anglo American PLC), Mary Barth, David Tweedie, Gilbert Gélard, Warren McGregor, and Tatsumi Yamada (formerly PriceWaterhouseCoopers and KPMG).

=== List of IASB chairs ===
- David Tweedie (April 2001-June 2011)
- Hans Hoogervorst (July 2011-June 2021)
- Andreas Barckow (July 2021-present)

== Due process ==
The IASB Due Process Handbook describes the consultative arrangements of the IASB, and includes information on how standards are developed.

== Funding ==
The IFRS Foundation raises funds for the operation of the IASB. The majority of the funding is voluntary contributions from jurisdictions that have put in place national financing regimes. The contribution is normally a percentage of the total gross domestic product of all contributing jurisdictions. Additionally, part of the contributions comes from the biggest accounting firms. In 2019, IFRS Foundation's revenue amounted to GBP 31 million, of which GBP 20 million came from contributions and GBP 11 million came from self generated revenue from publications and related activities.

== See also ==
- Bank regulation
- Big Four accounting firms
- BilMoG, the German Accounting Law Reform Act, modernises the German commercial accounting standards
- International Financial Reporting Standards
- Philosophy of accounting
